= SpotOption =

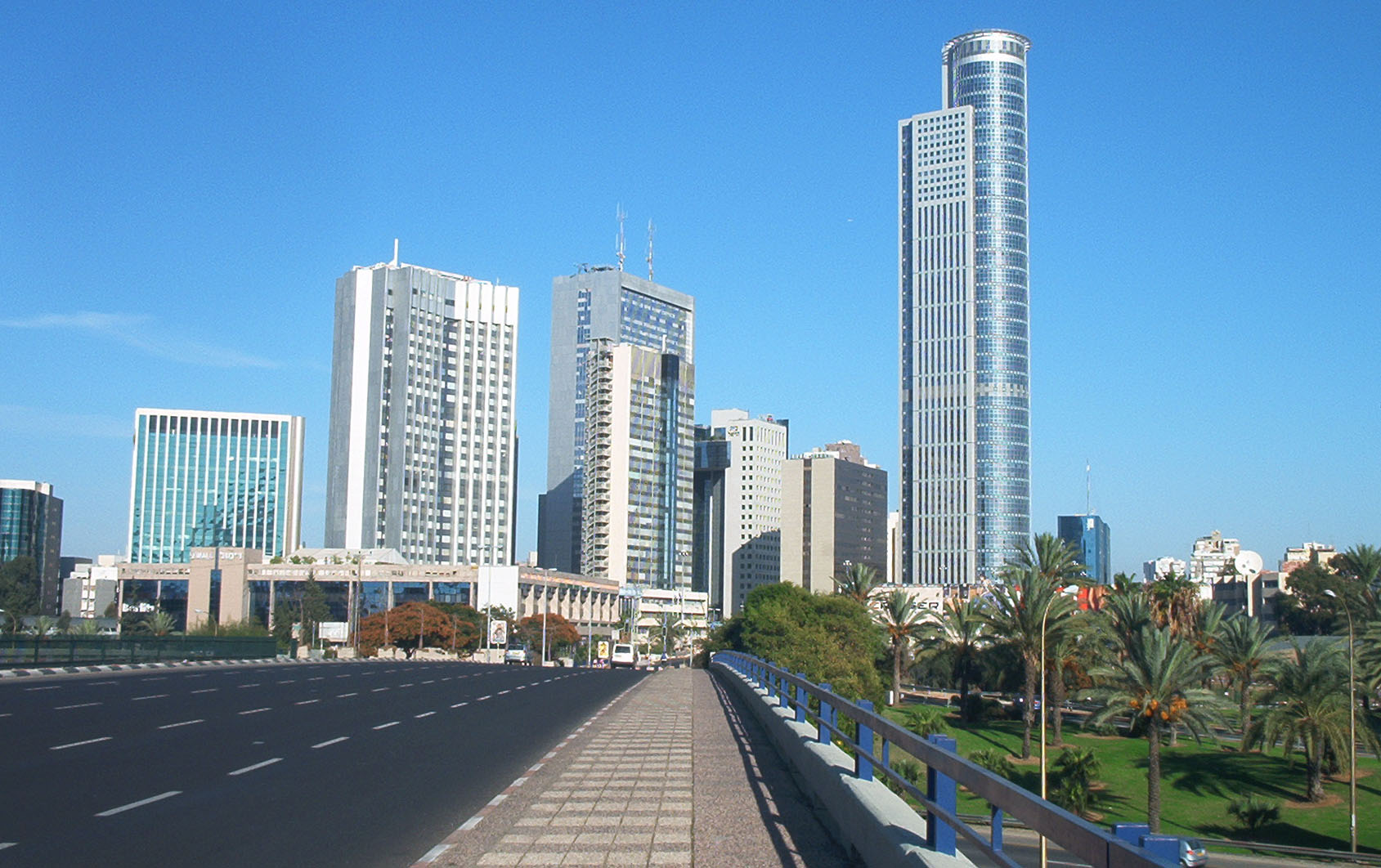
- SpotOption's office is located in Moshe Aviv Tower, on right.
- Industry: Gambling and binary options
- Founded: 2010, 2011 or 2016 (uncertain)
- Founder: Pinchas Peterktzishvilly also known as Pini Peter
- Headquarters: Ramat Gan, Israel
- Key people: Moshe Avrahami, CEO
- Production output: $5 billion in trades (claimed) (2015)
- Services: Backend for 300 affiliates
- Number of employees: 150 (2016)

SpotOption was a privately held platform software provider based in Israel in the controversial binary option industry, which was banned in Israel starting in January 2018. The firm announced that it has left the binary options business and is exploring other possibilities. It had previously announced a downsizing of its operations in Israel and moving many functions to other locations. The firm claimed to have 70 percent share in the market for binary options platforms, and charged binary options firms up to 12.5% of their revenues.

The firm's office in Ramat Gan was raided in a joint operation between the Israel Police and FBI in January 2018. The FBI was searching for evidence in the case of Lee Elbaz. Elbaz, CEO of Yukom, a binary options broker, was accused of fraud. She was convicted of three counts of wire fraud and one count of conspiracy to commit wire fraud in August 2019, and in December 2019 sentenced to 22 years in federal prison. As of March 2020 restitution to victims was still being decided but a figure of $28 million was being considered.

Pini Peter, owner of SpotOption said his company has left the binary options business and "I’m considering closing the company down altogether."

On 30 January 2018 Facebook banned advertisements for binary options trading as well as for cryptocurrencies and initial coin offering (ICOs).

== Founding ==
Sources disagree on the founding of the company. Bloomberg reports "Spot Option" at 7 Jabotinsky, Ramat Gan, Israel, was founded in 2011; a location consistent with information from Companies House in the UK which list a founding date of 2016.

The nonprofit public interest news organization Bureau of Investigative Journalism reports a unit in Israel appearing in 2010. They also report that the founder and primary shareholder is Pinchas Peterktzishvilly, also known as Pini Peter, who was convicted on money laundering charges in 2005. According to an advertisement for Banc De Binary, its CEO Oren Shabat Laurent was a founder of SpotOption. Oren himself was embroiled in significant controversy surrounding hiring experts to obfuscate the truth about Banc de Binary and SpotOption's affiliate funnel online; which effectively sees the latter create a range of affiliate funnel online products such as auto-traders, which in turn lure new depositors into placing funds at Spot Option's tied agents and brands.

== Market positioning and controversy ==
The firm claims that two thirds of the binary option dealers around the world use SpotOption, and that the firm has $5 billion annual trading volume. In 2015, the company's former CEO, Ran Amiran, said "SpotOption is the industry". SpotOption and TechFinancials together supply trading technology to brokers with claimed $8 billion annual turnover. SpotOption supplied brokerages including the now defunct Banc De Binary, formerly SpotOption's biggest client, and smaller brokerages including itrader, BDSwiss, OptionRally, Webitrader, and FXDD.

In 2016, SpotOption claimed 300 brands or affiliates. among them are:

- Banc de Binary, once SpotOption's largest client, shut down in January 2017 after being fined or prohibited from operating in multiple countries on three continents.
- BD Swiss, also known as Banc de Swiss, a licensed brand of Keplero Holdings Ltd, fined €150,000 in December 2016 by CySEC, the Cyprus Securities and Exchange Commission. BD Swiss has addresses in Cyprus and Germany, but not Switzerland.
- The demise via self-inflicted gunshot wound of Canadian entrepreneur, Fred Turbide, was attributed to Spot Option powered 23Traders.com brand.

According to the Bureau of Investigative Journalism, "PowerPoint presentations posted online by Hong Kong-based SpotOption sales manager Thomas Chang in 2016 and former Middle East sales manager Fakhri Husseini in 2013 told potential brokers that only 20% of people who invest in binary options ever get any money back after signing up." SpotOption exhibited at the IFX Expo International held in Cyprus in May 2016. Their director of marketing, Tammy Levy, when asked about crackdowns by law enforcement, was quoted as saying "SpotOption is a technology company, okay? Everyone is responsible for checking regulation in the jurisdiction where they want to work. I am here to tell you what options you have technologically."

In June 2021, a film was submitted as evidence in a civil case in Tel Aviv District Court alleging that a SpotOption insider revealed a fraudulent binary options scheme.

== Gambling using binary options ==
At the 2011 iGaming Super Show, the company showed its platform to traditional gaming vendors, claiming it was compatible with industry regulations and profitable for operators. Peterktzishvilly (Pini Peter) said they intended "to bridge the forex and gaming industries". The company appeared at numerous gambling industry trade shows including ICE Totally Gaming in London in 2014 and the American Gaming Association's Global Gaming Expo Asia 2015 in Macao, calling itself creator of "the perfect financial game".

In May 2015, SpotOption launched its new Spot5 platform that would include new instruments called "digital contracts". These were developed in order to meet new regulatory requirements. On 23 August 2017, the company announced their intention to launch a blockchain based trading platform for binary options called SpotChain, a new product which will raise money from the crowds to fund their operations.
