= Banc De Binary =

Israeli financial firm

- Type: Private
- Industry: Binary options
- Founded: 2009
- Key people: Oren Laurent (CEO); Abraham 'Abe' Cofnas, Head Analyst

Banc De Binary was an Israeli financial firm with a history of regulatory issues on three continents. On January 9, 2017, the company announced that it would be closing due to negative press coverage and its tarnished reputation. The firm also surrendered its brokerage license with the Cyprus Securities and Exchange Commission (CySEC) removing its ability to legally trade in the European Union. Its 2014 revenues were reported as $100 million.

It sold binary options on assets including foreign exchange. It was barred from accepting U.S. customers in August 2013 after being charged with several offenses by the Commodity Futures Trading Commission (CFTC) and U.S. Securities and Exchange Commission (SEC) in a civil lawsuit. The company agreed to pay $11 million in restitution and fines to settle the suit. It is also banned from accepting customers in Canada, Australia, New Zealand, and Israel.

The company operated an online trading website through which customers could buy binary options, predicting whether the price of a certain commodity will go up or down in a specific time period, as short as 60 seconds. Banc De Binary was an associate of SpotOption Exchange which sets the price of the option. The price of the option was not a market price, but was set by SpotOption Exchange itself.

The Wall Street Journal described it as "a website that allows people to bet on the price of gold, oil or stocks".

== Operations ==
The company allowed people to wager on changes in the price of various assets by using a pricing platform provided by an Israeli company, SpotOption, and customised by Banc De Binary. Customers did not own the asset but instead predicted whether its price would rise or fall. Banc De Binary's role was to create accounts for customers as a reseller of SpotOption's services. The company offered several kinds of options; customers could make predictions of the price of over 200 global assets including commodities, stocks, indices, and currencies using several variations of the trading platform including classic binary options, long term options, and sixty second options, and pairs trading. According to an advertisement for Banc De Binary, its CEO Oren Laurent was a founder of SpotOption, the firm that set the option prices.

In January 2017, Option.fm, a brand associated with Banc De Binary, was named by BuzzFeed as the operator of a bizarre scam known as the "Hawking code". The scam used a fake news site, purporting to be a part of CNN, and a fake interview with Stephen Hawking. According to the fake news site, Hawking developed a trading algorithm which would in effect transfer wealth from the top 0.1% of the world's wealthiest people to the other 99.9%. The site led to a trading site operated by Option.fm, headquartered in the Caribbean, that guaranteed trading profits using binary options. A second journalist traced the scam to Banc De Binary, which did not respond to his inquiries. Hawking's office at Cambridge University denied any connection to the scam. Oren Laurent was named in a lawsuit as the CEO of Option.fm, but he has denied it.

== History ==
Banc De Binary Ltd., based in Cyprus, along with ET Binary Options Ltd., BO Systems Ltd., and BDB Services Ltd., based in Israel and the Republic of Seychelles, collectively conducted business internationally as Banc De Binary. The organization was founded by Oren Laurent, a 31-year-old (as of 2016) American and Israeli citizen who lives on the outskirts of Tel Aviv. Laurent owns 50% of Banc De Binary, and was also the sole owner or 50% shareholder of ET Binary Options Ltd., BO Systems, Ltd., and BDB Services, Ltd. He claims to have graduated from New York University and be a real estate investor in Israel.

- In an interview the company's founder stated that the firm was founded on January 15, 2009, and that before, he had worked at "NAF Hedge Funds" and "Infinity Private Investment Funds", which he described as hedge funds in New York. In an advertisement, the company also claims to have been founded in Seychelles in 2008.
- In an interview, the company's founder also claimed that by June 2011 the company had around 20,000 client accounts, In a 2014 court case Banc De Binary claimed that it "is a small company, with approximately 60 employees".
- An article in the Independent on Sunday described it as a "leading City trading firm", although it did not have an office in the City of London, and the address the company gave was a virtual office space with no physical presence.
- On 7 January 2013, Banc De Binary was licensed as an investment firm by the Cyprus Securities and Exchange Commission (CySEC). Investment firms regulated by CySEC must demonstrate to CySEC that their activities comply with the laws of any non-EU countries where they do business. According to the company, its operations "outside of the European Union" are conducted by BDB Services Limited (formerly known as BO Systems Limited), which is incorporated in the Seychelles.
- The Financial Services Register maintained by the UK's Financial Conduct Authority states that from 25 February 2013 the company "is authorised or registered by ... [CySEC] ... and may be subject to limited regulation by the Financial Conduct Authority". The company had similar licences in Germany, Italy, France, and Spain. In accordance with the European Markets in Financial Instruments Directive (MiFID), the company "passported" into almost all member states of the EEA, even though clients based in other countries might receive nothing if the company collapsed.
- In June 2014, an advertisement on a freelance employment website offered more than $10,000 for "crisis management" of the BdB page on Wikipedia.
- In 2016, CySEC fined the locally based company (Banc De Binary Ltd). CySEC stated that "The settlement reached with BdB, for the possible violations, is for the amount of €350,000. The Company has paid the amount of €350,000". However, the reputational damages and legal ramifications were significant for BdB's Cypriot based operations.

=== Closing ===
A company official announced on January 9, 2017 that the company would be closing because of "consistently negative press" coverage. "It's just not worth the tarnished reputation. I don’t see how we can continue operating under such scrutiny and public image," said the official. The firm also surrendered its brokerage license with the Cyprus Securities and Exchange Commission (CySEC) on January 9, 2017, removing its ability to legally trade in the European Union. The firm remains under supervision by CySEC regarding previously incurred obligations and the formal closing of the firm. Reuters reported that the company's headquarters had been closed, the company's name removed, and a "for rent" sign placed on the building.

The Times of Israel reported that some industry insiders were skeptical that Banc De Binary was really closing, but was rather relocating and changing its name. One client who is owed €170,000 ($180,000) due to an August judgement from the Cyprus Ombudsman was still awaiting payment as of January 11, 2017. Banc De Binary's bank accounts are at Piraeus Bank Cyprus Limited, West East Bank, Credit Suisse, Wirecard Bank AG and TBI BANK EAD according to the Australian Securities & Investments Commission.

== Regulatory issues ==
=== SEC and CFTC enforcement actions ===
On June 6, 2013, Banc De Binary was charged by both the Commodity Futures Trading Commission and the Securities and Exchange Commission for alleged violations of U.S. financial regulations. The CFTC warned more generally of "fraudulent schemes involving binary options and their trading platforms".

On July 30, 2013, the SEC obtained a preliminary injunction from U.S. District Court for the District of Nevada to prevent and freeze any further trading with U.S. customers. Charges filed on August 7, 2013, stated that Banc De Binary "may be criminally liable under the federal RICO statute".

Banc De Binary at first refused to appear in court in the United States for depositions. Banc De Binary claimed to have an office in New York City at Trump Tower, but this was in fact a virtual office space with no significant physical presence. Trading and offering financial services to U.S. consumers without gaining a license first from U.S. regulators is illegal, as it would mean the client would have no protection. The company also claims on its site at its UK Companies House report to have an office at 1 King Street, EC2, in the City of London, but this, like its New York City address, was a virtual office with no physical presence. Banc De Binary's UK Companies House report says that they are based in Cyprus. Despite this, Banc de Binary was brought to trial in Nevada. Banc De Binary retained the services of Snell & Wilmer in Reno, Nevada, in relation to U.S. charges. This followed an earlier hearing where in the absence of any representation from Banc De Binary, charges were filed via email and by post.

Binary trading in the United States is legal, but it needs to be done through properly registered and regulated exchanges such as NADEX. Both the CFTC and SEC working filed civil suits against the company, seeking disgorgement, financial penalties and other preliminary and permanent injunctions against the company. In civil suits filed in Nevada, the SEC and CFTC allege that the company was offering off-exchange traded options to U.S. customers and unlawfully solicited US customers to buy and sell options. The CFTC and SEC's suit also alleges that it did not limit its offerings to eligible contract participants, contrary to U.S. regulations; a fully regulated broker would complete credit checks on customers to ensure that those with low finances did not trade with them. Among the allegations made by the SEC was that Banc De Binary induced people with limited funds, including one unemployed person with less than $1000, to open accounts. In response to the U.S. charges the company put out a statement that made no mention of its legal problems, but instead incorrectly implied that they were in negotiations and that they had voluntarily left the U.S. market, when in fact the SEC had taken an injunction out to stop them.

In a message posted on its website, the company stated that

[...] Banc De Binary is voluntarily discontinuing its operations in the United States. The United States Commodity Futures Trading Commission and Securities and Exchange Commission have asserted that Banc De Binary is not permitted to offer its binary option products to U.S. residents without registering with those agencies. We are currently in discussions with the CFTC and SEC about these issues, but in the interim, we have discontinued all business with U.S. residents.

On January 26, 2016, Banc De Binary agreed to a court order to pay $11 million in restitution and penalties to settle this case. The settlement agreement requires Banc De Binary to refund the losses of US customers. Refunds are being handled by the National Futures Association as court-appointed monitor. Banc De Binary is permanently barred from doing any business in the United States or with US persons.

In 2018 Leonel Alexis Valerio Santana and Frank Gregory Cedeno were charged in a U.S. court for criminal fraud. They allegedly impersonated SEC employees promising to help victims of Banc De Binary's scams obtain repayment of lost funds. Instead, they allegedly defrauded the victim by taking $1.3 million more.

In July 2018, the CFTC filed a complaint against Michael Shah and his company Zilmil asking for disgorgement and fines totaling $75 million. Shah and Zilmil advertised trading schemes by Banc de Binary and 15 other companies to traders in the U.S. even though none of the companies were registered to trade with U.S. customers. Shah also offered automatic trading systems, including the "Millionaire Money Machine" which Shah knew, according to his emails, did not produce the advertised results.

=== European Union ===
Within the European Union, the company was regulated by the CySEC. On 7 April 2014 CySec announced that they had fined Banc De Binary 10,000 euros after it had "concealed material information in its request for authorization CIF submitted to the commission in August 2012, namely concealed the existence of close links between it and another company".

=== Investor advisories ===
As of October 2013, the company was rated "F" by the United States' Better Business Bureau (BBB) because 31 complaints had been made against it, including 9 of which were unanswered. The BBB report also wrote that the "site essentially allows investors to gamble on the future price of something at a point in time".

It appears on the Securities and Exchange Commission's "List of Unregistered Soliciting Entities That Have Been the Subject of Investor Complaints".

In Canada, it is listed on the Ontario Securities Commission's Investors Warning List of "companies that appear to be engaging in activities that may pose a risk to investors".

After receiving "at least one complaint from a Québec investor who traded through Banc De Binary's platform and was unable to recover his investment", the Autorité des marchés financiers (AMF) warned investors about the company. It noted that a bonus of 50% of the opening deposit is available, but customers who accept the bonus are not allowed to make withdrawals until they have made trades equal to 20 times their initial deposit. The AMF also pointed out that, due to the "all or nothing" nature of binary options, an investor who wrongly predicts market movement will lose his entire investment. Banc De Binary is not registered with the AMF. The AMF also, like the CFTC, included a more general warning about the risk of fraud in binary options trading in the same press release.
