= Contract for difference =

Form of financial derivative

In finance, a contract for difference (CFD) is a financial agreement between two parties, commonly referred to as the "buyer" and the "seller." The contract stipulates that the buyer will pay the seller the difference between the value of an asset at the time the contract was initiated and the current value of the asset. If the asset's price increases from the opening to the closing of the contract, the seller compensates the buyer for the increase, which constitutes the buyer's profit. Conversely, if the asset's price decreases, the buyer compensates the seller, resulting in a profit for the seller. Because no ownership of the underlying asset is transferred, CFDs allow market participants to speculate on price movements without buying or selling the asset itself.

== History ==
=== Invention ===
Developed in Britain in 1974 as a way to leverage gold, modern CFDs have been trading widely since the early 1990s. CFDs were originally developed as a type of equity swap that was traded on margin. The invention of the CFD is widely credited to Brian Keelan and Jon Wood, both of UBS Warburg, during their Trafalgar House deal in the early 1990s.

=== Asset management and synthetic prime brokerage ===
CFDs were initially used by hedge funds and institutional traders to cost-effectively gain an exposure to stocks on the London Stock Exchange (LSE), partly because they required only a small margin but also, since no physical shares changed hands, they also avoided stamp duty; trades by the prime broker for its own account, for hedging purposes, are exempt from stamp duty.

It remains common for hedge funds and other asset managers to use CFDs as an alternative to physical holdings (or physical short selling) for UK-listed equities, with similar risk and leverage profiles. A hedge fund's prime broker will act as the counterparty to the CFD, and will often hedge its own risk under the CFD (or its net risk under all CFDs held by its clients, long and short) by trading physical shares on the exchange.

Institutional traders started to use CFDs to hedge stock exposure and avoid taxes. Several firms began marketing CFDs to retail traders in the late 1990s, stressing their leverage and tax-free status in the UK. A number of service providers expanded their products beyond the LSE to include global stocks, commodities, bonds, and currencies. Index CFDs, based on key global indexes including the Dow Jones, S&P 500, FTSE, and DAX, immediately gained popularity.

=== Retail trading ===
In the late 1990s, CFDs were introduced to retail traders. They were popularized by a number of UK companies, characterized by innovative online trading platforms that made it easy to see live prices and trade in real-time. The first company to do this was GNI (originally known as Gerrard & National Intercommodities). GNI provided retail stock traders with the opportunity to trade CFDs on LSE stocks through its innovative front-end electronic trading system, GNI Touch, via a home computer connected to the Internet. GNI's retail service created the basis for retail stock traders to trade directly onto the Stock Exchange Electronic Trading Service (SETS) central limit order book at the LSE through a process known as direct market access. For example, if a retail trader sent an order to buy a stock CFD, GNI would sell the CFD to the trader and then buy the equivalent stock position from the marketplace as a full hedge.

GNI and its CFD trading service GNI Touch was later acquired by MF Global. They were soon followed by IG Markets and CMC Markets, which started to popularize the service in 2000. Subsequently, European CFD providers such as Saxo Bank and Australian CFD providers such as Macquarie Bank and Prudential made significant progress in establishing global CFD markets.

Around 2001, a number of the CFD providers realized that CFDs had the same economic effect as financial spread betting in the UK, except that spread betting profits were exempt from capital gains tax. Most CFD providers launched financial spread betting operations in parallel to their CFD offering. In the UK, the CFD market mirrors the financial spread betting market and the products are in many ways the same; the FCA defines spread betting as "a contract for differences that is a gaming contract". However, unlike CFDs, which have been exported to a number of countries, spread betting, which relies on a country-specific tax advantage, has remained primarily limited to the UK and Ireland.

CFD providers then started to expand to overseas markets, starting with Australia in July 2002 by IG Markets (first CFD provider to be licensed by ASIC) and CMC Markets. CFDs have since been introduced into a number of other countries. They are available in most European countries, as well as Australia, Canada, Israel, Japan, Singapore, South Africa, Turkey, and New Zealand, throughout South America, and others. They are not permitted in a number of other countries – most notably the United States, where the Securities and Exchange Commission and Commodity Futures Trading Commission prohibit CFDs from being listed on regulated exchanges and being traded on foreign or domestic trading platforms due to their high risk. At the same time, a number of trading apps with various usage scenarios operate on the market, including eToro, Freetrade, Fidelity Personal Investing (part of Fidelity Investments), IG, Pepperstone, CMC Markets, EBC Financial Group, and Trading 212.

CFDs are treated as a gambling product in Hong Kong unless they have been permitted by the Securities and Futures Commission (SFC), which treats CFDs, where the underlying asset is a security, as futures contracts, that must be exchange-traded, effectively precluding their being offered in Hong Kong. However, the SFC has a separate regulatory regime for rolling spot foreign exchange contracts, which it terms "leverage foreign exchange contracts". These can be offered to retail clients as an over-the-counter derivative. Brokers in Hong Kong can also offer CFDs on the spot price of precious metals, which are not regulated as securities, using prices derived from contracts trading on the Chinese Gold and Silver Exchange Society.

In 2016, the European Securities and Markets Authority issued a warning on the sale of speculative products to retail investors that included the sale of CFDs.

=== Attempt by Australian exchange to move to exchange trading ===
The majority of CFDs are traded over-the-counter using the 'direct market access' or 'market maker' model, but from 2007 until June 2014 the Australian Securities Exchange offered exchange traded CFDs. As a result, a small percentage of CFDs were traded through the Australian exchange during this period.

The advantages and disadvantages of having an exchange traded CFD were similar for most financial products and meant reducing counterparty risk and increasing transparency, although costs were higher. The disadvantages of the exchange traded CFDs and lack of liquidity meant that most Australian traders opted for over-the-counter CFD providers.

=== Insider trading regulations ===
In June 2009, the Financial Services Authority, the UK regulator, implemented a general disclosure regime for CFDs to avoid them being used in insider information cases. This was after a number of high-profile cases where positions in CFDs were used instead of physical underlying stock to exempt them from the normal insider information disclosure rules.

=== Attempt at central clearing ===
In October 2013, LCH.Clearnet in partnership with Cantor Fitzgerald, ING Bank and Commerzbank launched centrally cleared CFDs in line with the EU financial regulators' stated aim of increasing the proportion of cleared OTC contracts.

=== European regulatory restrictions ===
In 2016, the European Securities and Markets Authority (ESMA) issued a warning on the sale of speculative products to retail investors that included the sale of CFDs. This was after they observed an increase in the marketing of these products at the same time as a rise in the number of complaints from retail investors who have suffered significant losses. Within Europe, any provider based in any member country can offer the products to all member countries under MiFID, and many of the European financial regulators responded with new rules on CFDs after the warning.

The majority of providers are based in either Cyprus or the UK and both countries' financial regulators were first to respond. CySEC, the Cyprus financial regulator, where many of the firms are registered, increased the regulations on CFDs in November 2016 by limiting the maximum leverage to 50:1 as well as prohibiting the paying of bonuses as sales incentives. This was followed by the UK Financial Conduct Authority issuing a proposal for similar restrictions on 6 December 2016, and imposing further restrictions on 1 August 2019 for CFDs and 1 September 2019 for CFD-like options with the maximum leverage being 30:1.

The German regulator BaFin took a different approach, and in response to the ESMA warning prohibited additional payments when a client made losses. The French regulator Autorité des marchés financiers decided to ban all advertising of CFDs. In March, the Irish Financial Regulator followed suit and put out a proposal to either ban CFDs or implement limitations on leverage. Beyond Europe, other regions have also set specific leverage limits. In Australia, the Australian Securities and Investments Commission has established leverage limits for retail CFD trading. In March 2021, they reduced the maximum leverage ratio to 30:1.

== Electricity generation ==
Several countries aim to support low-carbon electricity generation with CFDs.

In the United Kingdom, both nuclear and renewable contracts for difference were introduced by the Energy Act 2013, progressively replacing the previous Renewables Obligation scheme. A House of Commons Library report explained the scheme as:

Contracts for Difference (CfD) are a system of reverse auctions intended to give investors the confidence and certainty they need to invest in low carbon electricity generation. CfDs have also been agreed on a bilateral basis, such as the agreement struck for the Hinkley Point C nuclear plant.

CfDs work by fixing the prices received by low carbon generation, reducing the risks they face, and ensuring that eligible technology receives a price for generated power that supports investment. CfDs also reduce costs by fixing the price consumers pay for low carbon electricity. This requires generators to pay money back when wholesale electricity prices are higher than the strike price, and provides financial support when the wholesale electricity prices are lower.

The costs of the CfD scheme are funded by a statutory levy on all UK-based licensed electricity suppliers (known as the 'Supplier Obligation'), which is passed on to consumers.

In some countries, such as Turkey and France, the price may be fixed by the government rather than an auction.

=== One-sided and Two-sided CFDs ===
The terminology for CFDs in the renewables sector may differ from the finance sector.

Some government-provided CFDs for supporting renewables are 'one sided' (i.e. a put option). If the spot price is higher than the strike price, no payment is made.

Other CFDs for renewables are 'two sided', either with two strike prices (collar) or one (swap).

In the case of two strike prices (collar), if the spot price is lower than a strike price, the government pays the generator. If the spot price is higher than a second strike price, the generator pays the government. If the spot price is in between the two strike prices, no payment is made between the government and generator.

In the case of a two sided CFD with only one strike price (a swap, with no middle region) a payment is always made.

=== Quantity Component ===
The payment for a CFD equals the difference between the spot price and strike price, multiplied by a certain quantity. In most applications this entails a predefined quantity. For example, an airline may buy a CFD for ten million barrels of oil to hedge their expected consumption. If over the duration of the contract their planes actually consume 9 million or 11 million barrels, the contract payment will still be calculated using 10 million barrels. After signing the contract the number used for the quantity component of the calculation is independent of what the buyer and seller happen to physically consume or produce. These are known as "Production Independent", "Yardstick" or "Financial" CFDs.

In contrast, government-provided CFDs for supporting renewables tend to use the output of each specific generator as the quantity component. If a generator produces more or less power than expected, the government will pay (or receive) more or less money than expected (for a given spot price).

These are known as "Production Dependent" CFDs or "injection based" CFDs. These are similar to Power Purchase Agreements. (A Power Purchase Agreement is a production dependent swap).

=== CFDs difference from FTR ===
CFDs are different from financial transmission right (FTR) in two ways. First, a CFD is usually defined at a specific location, not between a pair of locations. Thus, CFDs are a tool principally for hedging temporal price risk – the variation in the nodal pricing or locational marginal pricing (LMP) over time at a specific location. Second, CFDs are not traded through regional transmission organizations (RTOs) markets. They are bilateral contracts between individual market participants.

== Risks ==
=== Market risk ===
The main risk is market risk, as contract for difference trading is designed to pay the difference between the opening price and the closing price of the underlying asset. CFDs are traded on margin, which amplifies risk and reward via leverage. A 2016 UK Financial Conduct Authority analysis of a sample of client accounts for CFD firms found that 82% of clients lost money, with similar figures in European jurisdictions. Average loss was £2,200.

It is this risk that drives the use of CFDs, either for speculation in financial markets, or for profit in a falling market through hedging. One of the ways to mitigate this risk is the use of stop loss orders. Users typically deposit an amount of money with the CFD provider to cover the margin, and can lose much more than this deposit if the market moves against them.

In the professional asset management industry, an investment vehicle's portfolio will usually contain elements that offset the leverage inherent in CFDs when looking at leverage of the overall portfolio. In particular, the retention of cash holdings reduces the effective leverage of a portfolio: if an investment vehicle buys 100 shares for £10,000 in cash, this provides the same exposure to the shares as entering into a CFD for the same 100 shares with £500 of margin, and retaining £9,500 as a cash reserve. The use of CFDs in this context therefore does not necessarily imply an increased market exposure (and where there is an increased market exposure, it will generally be less than the headline leverage of the CFD).

=== Liquidation risk ===
If prices move against an open CFD position, additional variation margin is required to maintain the margin level. The CFD providers may call upon the party to deposit additional sums to cover this, in what is known as a margin call. In fast-moving markets, margin calls may be at short notice. If funds are not provided in time, the CFD provider may close/liquidate the positions at a loss, for which the other party is liable.

=== Counterparty risk ===
Another dimension of CFD risk is counterparty risk, a factor in most over-the-counter (OTC) traded derivatives. Counterparty risk is associated with the financial stability or solvency of the counterparty to a contract. In the context of CFD contracts, if the counterparty to a contract fails to meet their financial obligations, the CFD may have little or no value, regardless of the underlying instrument. This means that a CFD trader could potentially incur severe losses, even if the underlying instrument moves in the desired direction.

OTC CFD providers are required to segregate client funds protecting client balances in event of company default, but cases such as that of MF Global remind us that guarantees can be broken. Exchange-traded contracts traded through a clearing house are generally believed to have less counterparty risk. Ultimately, the degree of counterparty risk is defined by the credit risk of the counterparty, including the clearing house if applicable. This risk is heightened due to the fact that custody is linked to the company or bank supplying the trading.

== Comparison with other financial instruments ==
There are a number of different financial instruments that have been used in the past to speculate on financial markets. These range from trading in physical shares either directly or via margin lending, to using derivatives such as futures, options or covered warrants. A number of brokers have been actively promoting CFDs as alternatives to all of these products. The CFD market most resembles the futures and options market, the major differences being:

- There is no expiry date, so no time decay;
- Trading is done over-the-counter with CFD brokers or market makers;
- CFD contract is normally one-to-one with the underlying instrument;
- CFD trading is banned in;
  - Belgium (for OTC instruments only),
  - United States
  - Hong Kong
  - United Kingdom (for Crypto CFD Trading)
- Minimum contract sizes are small, so it is possible to buy one share CFD;
- Easy to create new instruments: not restricted to exchange definitions or jurisdictional boundaries, so very wide selection of underlying instruments can be traded.

=== Futures ===
CFDs and futures trading are both forms of derivatives trading. A futures contract is an agreement to buy or sell the underlying asset or instrument at a set price at a set date in the future, regardless of how the price changes in the meanwhile. Professionals prefer future contracts for indices and interest rate trading over CFDs, as they are a mature product and are exchange traded. The main advantages of CFDs, compared to futures, is that contract sizes are smaller, making them more accessible for small traders; and that pricing is more transparent. Futures contracts tend to only converge to the price of the underlying instrument near the expiry date, whereas the CFD never expires and simply mirrors the underlying instrument.

Futures are often used by CFD providers to hedge their own positions, and many CFDs are written over futures as futures prices are easily obtainable. CFDs do not have expiry dates, so when a CFD is written over a futures contract the CFD contract has to deal with the futures contract expiration date. The industry practice is for the CFD provider to 'roll' the CFD position to the next future period when the liquidity starts to dry in the last few days before expiry, thus creating a rolling CFD contract.

=== Options ===
Options, like futures, are established products that are exchange traded, centrally cleared and used by professionals. Options, like futures, can be used to hedge risk or to take on risk to speculate. CFDs are only comparable in the latter case. The main advantage of CFDs over options is the price simplicity and range of underlying instruments. An important disadvantage is that a CFD cannot be allowed to lapse, unlike an option. This means that the downside risk of a CFD is unlimited, whereas the most that can be lost on an option (by a buyer) is the price of the option itself. In addition, no margin calls are made on options if the market moves against the trader.

Compared to CFDs, option pricing is complex and has price decay when nearing expiry, while CFD prices simply mirror the underlying instrument. CFDs cannot be used to reduce risk in the way that options can.

=== Covered warrants ===
Similar to options, covered warrants have become popular as a way of speculating cheaply on market movements. CFD costs tend to be lower for short periods and have a much wider range of underlying products. In markets such as Singapore, some brokers have been heavily promoting CFDs as alternatives to covered warrants, and this may have been partially responsible for the decline in volume of covered warrants.

=== Physical shares, commodities and foreign exchange ===
This is the traditional way to trade financial markets, which requires a relationship with a broker in each country, paying broker fees and commissions and dealing with settlement process for that product. With the advent of discount brokers, this has become easier and cheaper, but can still be challenging for retail traders, particularly if trading in overseas markets. Without leverage, trading is capital intensive as all positions have to be fully funded. CFDs make it much easier to access global markets for much lower costs, and much easier to move in and out of a position quickly. All forms of margin trading involve financing costs, in effect the cost of borrowing the money for the whole position.

=== Margin lending ===
Margin lending, also known as margin buying or leveraged equities, have all the same attributes as physical shares, but with the addition of leverage, which means that – like CFDs, futures, and options – much less capital is required, but risks are increased. Since the advent of CFDs, many traders have moved from margin lending to CFD trading. The main benefits of CFD versus margin lending are that there are more underlying products, the margin rates are lower, and it is easy to go short. Even with the recent bans on short selling, CFD providers who have been able to hedge their book in other ways have allowed clients to continue to short sell those stocks.

== Criticism ==
Some financial commentators and regulators have expressed concern about the way that CFDs are marketed to new and inexperienced traders by the CFD providers; in particular, the way that potential gains are advertised in a way that may not fully explain the risks involved. In anticipation and response to this concern, most financial regulators that cover CFDs specify that risk warnings must be prominently displayed on all advertising, on web sites and when new accounts are opened. For example, the UK FSA rules for CFD providers include that they must assess the suitability of CFDs for each new client based on their experience and must provide a risk warning document to all new clients, based on a general template devised by the FSA. The Australian financial regulator, the Australian Securities & Investments Commission, on its trader information site suggests that trading CFDs is riskier than gambling on horses or going to a casino. Even a small price change against one's CFD position can have an impact on trading returns or losses. It recommends that trading CFDs should be carried out by individuals who have extensive experience of trading, in particular during volatile markets, and can afford losses that any trading system cannot avoid.

There has also been concern that CFDs are little more than gambling, implying that most traders lose money trading CFDs. It is impossible to confirm what the average returns are from trading as no reliable statistics are available and CFD providers do not publish such information. However, prices of CFDs are based on publicly available underlying instruments and odds are not stacked against traders, as the CFD is simply the difference in underlying price.

There has also been concern that CFD trading lacks transparency as it happens primarily over-the-counter and there is no standard contract. This has led some to suggest that CFD providers could exploit their clients. This topic appears regularly on trading forums, in particular when it comes to rules around executing stops, and liquidating positions in margin call. This is also something that the Australian Securities Exchange, promoting their Australian exchange traded CFD, and some of the CFD providers promoting direct market access products, have used to support their particular offering. They argue that their offering reduces this risk in some way. The counter argument is that there are many CFD providers and the industry is very competitive, with over twenty CFD providers in the UK alone. If there were issues with one provider, clients could switch to another. Providers of CFDs often target potential investors through magazine advertisements, newspaper supplements, prime-time television spots and websites.

Some of the criticism surrounding CFD trading is connected with the CFD brokers' unwillingness to inform their users about the psychology involved in this kind of high-risk trading. Factors such as the fear of losing, that translates into neutral and even losing positions, become a reality when the users change from a demonstration account to the real one.

Criticism has also been expressed about the way that some CFD providers hedge their own exposure, and the conflict of interest that this could cause when they define the terms under which the CFD is traded. A 2010 article suggested that some CFD providers had been running positions against their clients based on client profiles, in the expectation that those clients would lose, and that this created a conflict of interest for the providers.

== See also ==
- Betting exchange
- Bookmaker
- Derivative (finance)
- Financial betting
- Spread betting § Financial spread betting
- Futures contract
- Parimutuel betting
- Prediction market
- Point shaving
- Sports betting
- Spread trade
- Technical analysis
- Turbo (finance)
