= Trading 212 =

European fintech broker

Trading 212 Group Limited
- Formerly: Avus Capital Group Limited (2016–2017)
- Type: Privately held company
- Industry: Financial services
- Founded: 2004; 22 years ago in Sofia, Bulgaria
- Founders: Ivan Ashminov and Borislav Nedialkov
- Headquarters: London, United Kingdom
- Products: Forex, Stocks, exchange-traded funds (ETFs), CFDs
- Services: Stockbroker, Electronic trading platform
- Revenue: ▲£194.140 million (2024)
- Operating income: ▲£48.618 million (2024)
- Net income: ▲£43.785 million (2024)
- Total assets: ▲£249.545 million (2024)
- Total equity: ▲£205.203 million (2024)
- Number of employees: 422 (2024)
- Website: www.trading212.com

Trading 212 is a European fintech brokerage group founded in Bulgaria in 2004 and headquartered in London, United Kingdom.

The group operates an electronic trading platform that offers commission-free investing in listed equities and ETFs, alongside contracts for difference (CFDs). In 2024 the company introduced a debit card product.

Trading 212 serves clients in multiple countries across Europe, the Middle East, Africa, Latin America, and the Asia-Pacific region.

== History ==
Trading 212 was co-founded by Ivan Ashminov and Borislav Nedialkov in Bulgaria in 2004, originally under the name Avus Capital. As recalled by Ashminov, he purchased the domain name Trading 212 for £10 and himself wrote the code for the first version of their investing platform.

Initially, the company specialised in forex trading and developed proprietary trading software. Trading 212 UK Limited has been authorised by the UK's Financial Conduct Authority (FCA).

In 2017, it launched commission-free share dealing in the UK.

In January 2021, during the GameStop short squeeze, along with Robinhood Markets, the company prevented users from buying GameStop shares and only allowed them to sell their existing shares.

In February 2021, Trading 212 was reported to be the most downloaded mobile application in the United Kingdom, and it paused the onboarding of new UK clients during the surge in demand. Full UK client onboarding resumed in 2022.

In 2021, following Brexit, Trading 212 began onboarding EU residents through Trading 212 Markets Ltd, its Cyprus-regulated entity licensed by the Cyprus Securities and Exchange Commission in March 2021.

For the 2021 financial year, Trading 212 Group reported pre-tax profit of £86 million, up 473% from the previous year, and revenue of £138.7 million, an increase of 11.2%. For 2022, pre-tax profit fell to £40.5 million from £86 million, while the group's Cypriot and Bulgarian entities together recorded a loss of approximately £10.3 million.

It launched its Cash ISA savings product in 2024, and introduced a multi-currency payment card for UK customers. In the same year, Trading 212 completed its acquisition of FXFlat Bank GmbH, a German financial services provider licensed by BaFin, for approximately €4 million.

In February 2026, Trading 212 received authorisation from the Financial Conduct Authority to offer self-invested personal pensions (SIPPs).

== Business model ==
Trading 212 operates a commission-free model for its stock trading services, meaning that clients are not charged commissions or custody fees for holding assets on the platform. For its stockbroking business, the group earns currency conversion fees, retains a portion of interest earned on client money, and has earned fees through a collateralised stock-lending programme.

In 2021, Trading 212 changed how it hedged risk on its CFD business, moving from an internal back-to-back arrangement to hedging exposures with external counterparties.

In May 2025, the company reported more than £25 billion in client assets under administration and approximately 4.5 million lifetime funded accounts globally.

For the year ended 31 December 2024, Trading 212 Group generated revenue of more than £194 million and net profit of £43.8 million. Its UK entity generated £161.7 million in revenue, of which £150 million came from investment brokerage services. Advertising and marketing costs exceeded £65 million, staff costs were £27.7 million, and the group had 422 employees at year-end. In 2025, Trading 212 UK Limited reported revenue of £277.6 million, up 72% from the previous year, and net profit of £92.2 million. Of its revenue, almost £257 million came from trading, £20.6 million from client interest income, and £1.68 million from debit cards.

== Regulations ==
Trading 212 is regulated in multiple jurisdictions. It is authorised by Bulgaria's Financial Supervision Commission (FSC), the United Kingdom's Financial Conduct Authority (FCA), the German Federal Financial Supervisory Authority (BaFin), the Cyprus Securities and Exchange Commission (CySEC), and the Australian Securities and Investments Commission (ASIC).

== Controversies ==
During the GameStop short squeeze in January 2021, Trading 212 temporarily restricted some customers from placing buy orders in certain stocks; the UK's Financial Ombudsman Service later published decisions relating to complaints about the restrictions.

In October 2025, the UK's Financial Conduct Authority (FCA) lifted its ban on retail access to certain crypto exchange-traded notes (cETNs) and said firms should ensure they had the correct permissions before offering such products to consumers. The Financial Times reported that Trading 212 allowed UK retail customers to buy crypto ETNs between October 2025 and January 2026 before obtaining the relevant permission; it later applied for permission after being contacted by the FCA and its status on the FCA register was updated in January 2026.

== See also ==
- List of electronic trading platforms
