= IG Group =

United Kingdom-based online trading provider

IG Group Holdings plc

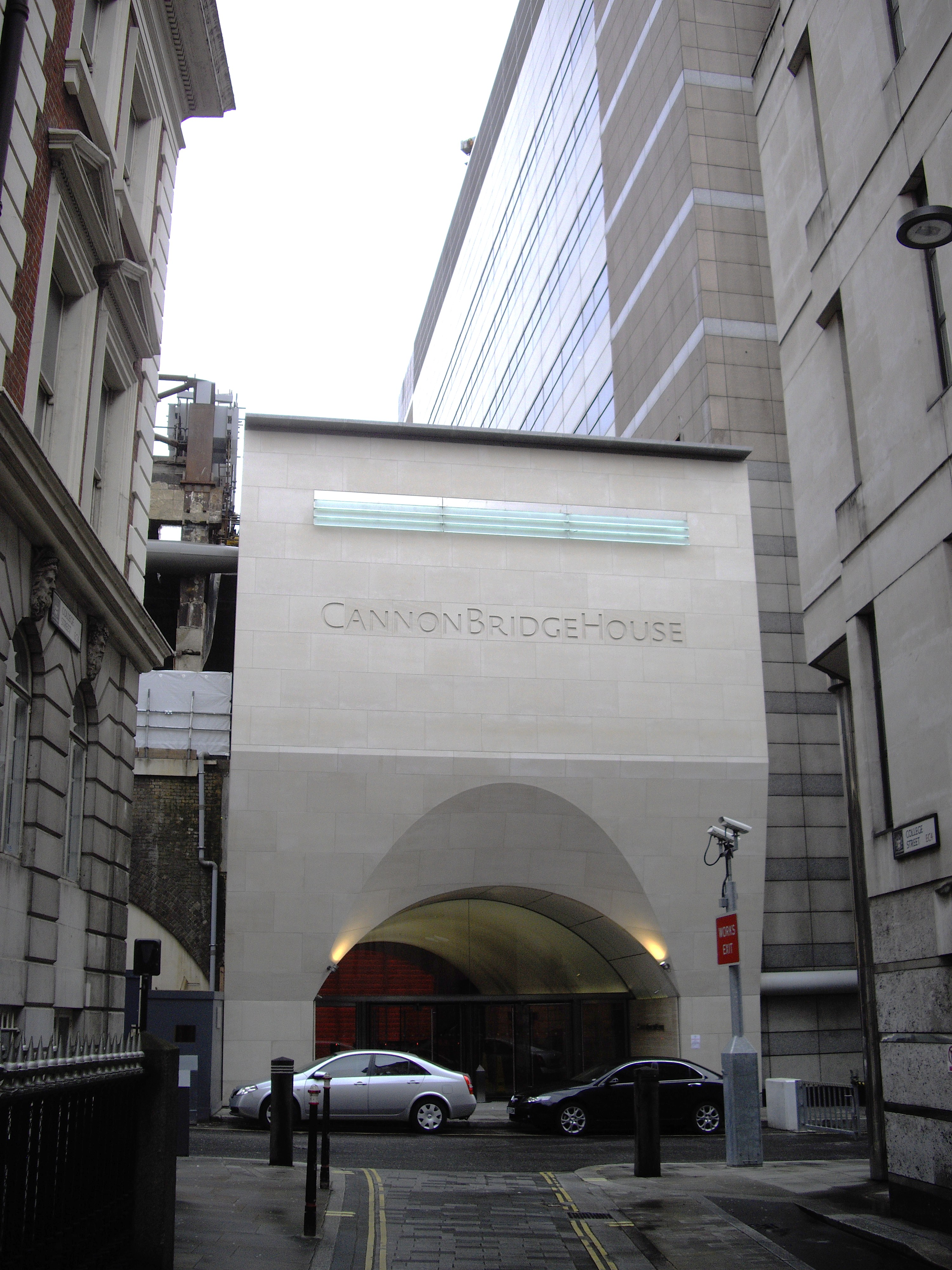
- Cannon Bridge House, IG Group's London headquarters until 2026
- Formerly: IG Group Holdings Limited (2003–2005)
- Type: Public limited company
- Traded as: LSE: IGG; FTSE 100 component
- Industry: Financial services
- Founded: 1974
- Headquarters: London, England, United Kingdom
- Key people: Andrew Barron (chairman); Breon Corcoran (CEO)
- Services: OTC derivatives; Exchange-traded derivatives; Stock trading and investments; Cryptocurrency trading
- Revenue: £658.9 million (seven months ended 31 December 2025)
- Operating income: £265.6 million (2025)
- Net income: £292.1 million (2025)
- Number of employees: 2,354 (December 2025)
- Subsidiaries: tastytrade; tastylive; Freetrade; Independent Reserve
- Website: www.iggroup.com

IG Group Holdings plc, trading as IG Group, is a United Kingdom-based online trading and investment provider, offering access to spread betting, US futures and options, stock and crypto trading, which allows traders to bet on the direction of equities, bonds and currencies without owning the underlying assets.

Established in 1974 by Stuart Wheeler, the company is headquartered in London and operates in the UK, Europe, APAC and the USA. It is listed on the London Stock Exchange and is a constituent of the FTSE 100 Index. IG's UK businesses are regulated by the Financial Conduct Authority (FCA).

== History ==
=== Early years (1974–2000) ===
IG was founded in 1974 as IG Index (Investors Gold Index) by British financier Stuart Wheeler, with an initial investment of £30,000 from six friends. It became the first company to offer spread betting, allowing investors to speculate on gold prices rather than buying physical gold, which was restricted by UK exchange controls at the time.

In 1993, IG Group expanded into spread betting on sports events, and in 1996, it started offering foreign exchange trading.

=== Market expansion and IPO (2000–2010) ===
In July 2000, IG Group was formed as the parent company of IG Index, and its shares were listed on the London Stock Exchange, making it the first company of its kind to go public. Sports betting surged with the rise of the internet, bringing the company more than £10 million in revenue in the second half of 2001, nearly triple its earnings from the first half of 2000.

IG Group entered the Australian market in 2002, marking its first international expansion. In 2003, founder Stuart Wheeler sold his 23.68% stake in the company, netting £90 million. He was joined by some other major shareholders, so a total number of shares to be sold reached 30%. A management buyout backed by CVC Capital Partners valued the company at £143 million. In April 2005, IG Group returned to the stock market with a valuation of £1.3 billion, and CVC sold off £58 million worth of shares.

The company continued its global expansion, entering the United States market in 2007 with the £2.9 million purchase of HedgeStreet, an online derivatives trading platform, later rebranded as Nadex. In September 2008, IG Group acquired FXOnline, a Japanese trading firm, for £112 million.

=== Challenges and diversification (2011–2020) ===
In 2011, IG Group reported a net loss of £25.5 million, largely due to regulatory changes in Japan that restricted leverage to 10 times, significantly lower than the 100 times or more the company previously offered. The company also shut down its sports betting service, extrabet, due to declining revenues, incurring £5.3 million in closure costs.

In September 2014, IG Group launched an online stockbroking platform, offering access to 4,500 stocks. In September 2016, it acquired the financial news and research portal DailyFX from FXCM for $40 million. However, the same year, IG Group's shares fell 38% following the Financial Conduct Authority's (FCA) announcement of new industry regulations, wiping £1 billion off the company's market value. In response, IG withdrew its binary options product in early 2017.

In 2017, IG partnered with BlackRock to launch the IG Smart Portfolio, marking the company's entry into wealth management. In 2019, IG launched a new US subsidiary, IG US, which offers foreign exchange trading (in June 2024, IG US rebranded to tastyfx).

In mid-2018, the European Securities and Markets Authority (ESMA) implemented new rules banning binary options for retail clients and placing leverage limits and other restrictions on CFDs. These measures, which took effect in the second half of 2018, were cited as a major factor in subsequent declines in IG Group's revenue and profit in Europe.

In 2020, IG Group launched its environmental, social, and governance (ESG) strategy, "Brighter Future." As part of this initiative, the company established a £2 million fund to support education and development programs for young people, particularly in response to the impact of the COVID-19 pandemic.

=== Recent developments (2021–present) ===
In January 2021, IG Group acquired Chicago-based online brokerage Tastytrade for $1 billion, enhancing its offerings for retail investors. The company, founded in 2011 by Tom Sosnoff, included the brokerage arm tastyworks, which was rebranded as tastytrade in 2023.

In March 2022, IG Group completed the sale of the North American Derivatives Exchange (Nadex) and its 39% stake in the Small Exchange to Foris DAX Markets Inc. (trading as Crypto.com) for $216 million. In April 2023, IG agreed to reacquire the Small Exchange from Foris DAX Markets.

In the first half of the 2024 fiscal year, IG Group reported a 32% drop in after-tax profits compared to the previous year. By the end of the 2024 fiscal year, pre-tax profits had fallen by 11%, annual revenue had dropped by 10%, and the number of active clients had decreased from 358,000 to 346,200. The company had announced plans to cut 10% of its workforce in October 2023. In July 2024, it announced a £150 million share buyback program, starting with a £75 million tranche in August.

In January 2025, it announced the acquisition of Freetrade, a UK-based commission-free trading app, for £160 million. The deal, completed on 1 April 2025, more than doubled the company's active client base to approximately 820,000 by the end of FY2025. In June 2025, IG launched direct cryptocurrency trading for its UK clients. In September 2025, IG agreed to acquire Independent Reserve, a regulated cryptocurrency exchange based in Australia. The transaction, valued at around A$178 million for a 70% stake, received regulatory approval in January 2026 and was then completed, with Independent Reserve's founders retaining the remaining 30% interest. On 30 September 2025, IG obtained cryptoasset registration from the UK Financial Conduct Authority, allowing it to expand its spot cryptocurrency offering. It also obtained a European cryptoasset licence under the Markets in Crypto-Assets Regulation (MiCA) in November 2025. In October 2025, IG sold the Small Exchange, which it had reacquired in 2023, to Payward, parent company of crypto exchange Kraken, for $100 million.

The company's financial performance rebounded alongside these initiatives. For the year ended 31 May 2025, IG Group reported an adjusted pre-tax profit of £535.8 million, up 17% year-on-year, driven by higher trading volumes amid market volatility. The company authorised a new £125 million share buyback in July 2025, later increasing it to £200 million in December 2025. In November 2025, IG changed its financial year end from 31 May to 31 December, resulting in a seven-month transitional reporting period ending 31 December 2025.

During 2025, IG exited its commercial operations in South Africa, closing domestic client accounts and surrendering its local Over-the-Counter Derivative Provider licence. In February 2026, it closed its South African office.

In March 2026, IG began a strategic review that included potential acquisitions or partnerships and possible changes to its corporate domicile and stock-market listing. In July, the company proposed establishing a new holding company in Jersey, while retaining its London Stock Exchange listing, UK tax residence and London operations.

In mid-2026, IG Group agreed to acquire US daily fantasy sports and prediction markets operator Underdog for up to $1.3 billion, expanding its presence in the US prediction markets sector. For the first half of 2026, IG reported an 18% increase in revenue to £642.8 million and a 4% increase in core profit to £282 million.

== Markets ==
IG Group is headquartered in London, and operates across Europe, North America, Asia-Pacific and the Middle East. The company provides clients with access to around 21,000 financial instruments.

As of September 2026, the company's market value was £4.5 billion.

IG Group offers a range of leveraged and investment products, varying by region due to differing national regulations. In the United States, through its tastytrade subsidiary, it offers options, futures, and cryptocurrency trading tailored to individual investors.

== Management ==
Tim Howkins, who was chief financial officer before becoming CEO in October 2006, led the company for nine years before retiring in 2015. Peter Hetherington succeeded him as CEO in October 2015, having joined IG Group as a graduate trainee in 1994. Hetherington stepped down in September 2018.

In October 2018, IG Group appointed June Felix as CEO. Felix had previously served as a non-executive director for three years before joining the board. Due to health issues, Felix resigned in December 2023, and Breon Corcoran was appointed as the CEO.

In September 2025, IG Group announced that chairman Mike McTighe would step down after a successor was appointed. Andrew Barron was appointed to the board as a non-executive director and board chair designate in March 2026. Following regulatory approval from the Financial Conduct Authority, he assumed the role of chair on 1 April 2026.

== Controversy ==
=== Violations of customers' rights and system outages ===
IG Group has faced criticism in the media regarding its handling of customer losses. Natalia Chumak, a partner at litigation firm Signature Litigation, said that customers trading with IG Group can incur unlimited losses, while the company does not always make this risk clear. She also said that IG Group may avoid certain risks but benefits from any gains.

In May 2020, media reported repeated outages of IG Group's trading platform during periods of high market volatility, leaving some clients unable to manage their positions. FinanceFeeds also reported a significant outage in January 2021 and criticised the company's customer support during the incident.

In April 2024, a system error led to funds being mistakenly withdrawn from the accounts of more than 50 customers. Some cases remained unresolved for more than a week before media reports drew attention to the problem.

In April 2026, IG Securities, IG's Japanese subsidiary, disclosed that personal data of 162,879 customers may have been accessible within the IG group. Records of 29,734 customers had been stored on an external server, but the company said it had not detected any data leakage outside IG Group.

=== Political donations ===
IG Group's founder, Stuart Wheeler, was actively involved in politics and made several notable donations. His financial contributions, particularly to the Brexit campaign, earned him a reputation as "a leading disrupter in British politics".

=== Lawsuits ===
In 2010, IG Index (IG Group's spread betting division) faced a £21 million (€25 million) lawsuit filed by three former clients of the defunct Scottish trading firm Echelon Wealth Management. The clients believed that their funds had been ring-fenced in segregated IG deposit accounts. However, following Echelon's collapse, IG used these funds to cover other Echelon clients' losses. The claim was dismissed in 2013.

In January 2015, more than 370 clients incurred significant losses following a failure of IG's trading platform during a volatile market event. On 15 January, the Swiss National Bank (SNB) unexpectedly removed its minimum exchange rate for the Swiss franc, causing a 30% drop in EUR/CHF. IG delayed its response by 10 minutes, attempting to hedge its own exposure while competitors acted immediately to protect their clients. Additionally, technical issues on the platform required manual execution of stop-loss orders, further amplifying client losses. Some affected clients were left with substantial debts, with one teacher on a £18,000 salary losing £280,000. Despite these incidents, IG maintained that it had fulfilled its contractual obligations. In June 2015, the Financial Ombudsman Service ordered IG to compensate affected customers around £1 million in total.

As of October 2024, IG Group faced two class-action lawsuits in Australia, alleging misleading and unconscionable conduct. In May 2023, the law firm Piper Alderman filed a class action against IG Markets, accusing the company of promoting contracts for difference (CFDs) to inexperienced traders without proper safeguards. A second class action was filed in August 2023 against IG Markets Limited and IG Australia Pty Ltd, alleging that from May 2017 to August 2023, IG misled retail investors by promoting high-risk financial products, such as CFDs and binary options, which were deemed unsuitable and harmful by the Australian Securities and Investments Commission (ASIC). The legal action is being funded by Woodsford Litigation Funding.

In November 2025, in Tomasso v IG Markets Ltd (Supreme Court of Western Australia), the court ruled that IG's "manifest error" contract clause was unfair and therefore void under Australian consumer law. The clause allowed the firm to void or adjust trades unilaterally. IG was required to pay a customer AU$5.5 million after it attempted to cancel trades under that clause.

== Sponsorship ==
During its history, IG Group signed several notable sponsorship deals:

- The company sponsored Getafe CF football club in the 2010–2011 Spanish season.
- In November 2010, IG Markets signed a sponsorship deal to support Team Sky professional cycling team in 2011.
- In December 2010, IG Markets announced sponsorship of two stages of the Santos Tour Down Under cycling race in 2011.
- In October 2013, IG signed a sponsorship deal with the Harlequins rugby union team for three years. In September 2014, the deal was expanded to make IG one of the team's three principal sponsors.
- In May 2015, IG Group became a partner of Melbourne Football Club for the 2015 and 2016 seasons.
- In May 2021, IG Group became a partner of the England cricket team for 2021 and 2022.
- In February 2024, IG Group entered into a 10-year naming rights agreement for an upcoming sports and entertainment arena in Nagoya, Japan, naming the Aichi International Arena as the "IG Arena".
