= IQ Option =

Cypriot financial services company

- Founded: 2013
- Founder: Dmitry Zaretsky
- Headquarters: Limassol, Cyprus
- Number of employees: 200 (2023)
- Website: iqoption.com

IQ Option is a binary options trading broker that also offers services in Forex, stocks, and cryptocurrencies. The company was founded in 2013. In 2017, IQ Option shifted its focus to CFDs and cryptocurrencies, though binary options remain a significant part of its operations in certain markets, particularly where regulations are less stringent.

Operating in various jurisdictions without proper authorization or licensing, IQ Option has faced fines, lawsuits, and bans. Regulators in multiple jurisdictions have issued warnings or taken actions concerning IQ Option or entities using the IQ Option brand, including administrative sanctions by the Cyprus Securities and Exchange Commission (CySEC), an ASIC action regarding unlicensed OTC derivative providers, a stop-order/market alert by Brazil's CVM, and inclusion on the Reserve Bank of India's alert list of unauthorised forex trading platforms.

== Profile ==
As of 2023, the company is headquartered in Cyprus and employs around 200 people across offices in Dubai, London, Gibraltar, the US, Australia, Eastern Europe, and Malaysia. The company offers over 250 financial instruments, including Forex, stocks, cryptocurrencies (26 listed), commodities, and ETFs. IQ Option claims to have millions of customers in more than 200 countries.

In March 2026, IQ Option was part of Quadcode, a group that also operated Amaiz and Quadcode AI. In the same month, Quadcode acquired "a significant strategic stake" in Game 7, the operator of FPFX, PropAccount.com and BullRush.

== History ==
IQ Option was founded by Dmitry Zaretsky, a Russian entrepreneur who grew up in Saint Petersburg and graduated from the Saint Petersburg State University Mathematics and Mechanics Faculty.

The CySEC register lists IQOption Europe Ltd as a Cypriot investment firm with licence number 247/14 (licence date: 30 July 2014). By 2016, its trading platform had gained visibility in the retail trading sector.

In 2017, IQ Option shifted its focus from binary options to CFDs and cryptocurrencies. In the same period it launched dedicated trading apps for iOS and Android,, announced a blockchain-based project called "Open Trading Network", and joined the Serenity Financial blockchain-based settlement system. During this period, IQ Option claimed to employed over 550 specialists in offices in Saint Petersburg and Limassol, while its monthly trading volume reportedly exceeded $11 million. The company also revealed plans for an ICO.

In 2021, IQ Option established a subsidiary, Quadcode Markets, which focuses on trading foreign exchange, commodities, stock indices, and cryptocurrencies through CFDs. In 2024, Quadcode launched a SaaS white-label platform. Additionally, Quad Code AU Ltd operates in Australia and is licensed by ASIC.

The company also introduced Islamic accounts for Android users, promoting no-swap trading and offering over 21 halal shares to cater to a specific market segment.

In September 2023, CySEC removed IQ Option Europe LTD from the Register of Crypto Asset Service Providers (CASPs) due to the company not providing crypto-asset services for a continuous period of six months. Later that year, Quadcode Markets acquired a trading license from the Securities Commission of the Bahamas.

== Regulatory actions and warnings ==
=== Cyprus ===
In 2016, Cyprus Securities and Exchange Commission imposed administrative fines totalling €180,000 for multiple violations, including misleading marketing materials, outsourcing failures and inadequate compliance procedures. The original decision also included a €20,000 component for non-compliance with best-execution requirements under section 38. On 19 December 2016, after considering new information submitted by the company regarding its compliance with those requirements, CySEC revoked the section 38 finding and the corresponding €20,000 component of the fine. In 2019, IQ Option paid €450,000 to settle possible violations concerning conflict-of-interest arrangements, appropriateness assessments, the selection of execution venues, customer due diligence, record keeping and ongoing monitoring.

=== Australia ===
In Australia, IQ Option operated without a license until 2016, only addressing regulatory shortcomings after receiving a formal warning from the Australian Securities and Investments Commission (ASIC).

=== Singapore ===
In Singapore, since July 2017, IQ Option has been listed on the Monetary Authority of Singapore (MAS) Investor Alert List.

=== India ===
The Reserve Bank of India's Alert List, updated on 19 November 2025, includes IQ Option and identifies listed entities as neither authorised to deal in foreign exchange under the Foreign Exchange Management Act (FEMA), 1999, nor authorised to operate forex electronic trading platforms. The RBI has warned that residents using unauthorised platforms may face action under FEMA.

In 2021, the company faced a class-action lawsuit in India alleging fraud through a cryptocurrency investment scheme. Victims claimed IQ Option promised returns of up to 900% but blocked withdrawals under the guise of technical errors. The lawsuit sought a permanent ban on the company's operations in India. The suit was withdrawn on 30 March 2021.

=== Indonesia ===
In February 2022, Indonesia's Commodity Futures Trading Regulatory Agency (Bappebti) said that 92 unlicensed binary-options websites, including IQ Option, had been blocked and described binary options as a form of online gambling that was illegal in Indonesia.

=== Brazil ===
In April 2020, Brazil's securities commission (CVM) issued a stop order stating that IQ Option Ltd was not authorised to solicit Brazilian residents and ordering the immediate suspension of public offers of investment opportunities. In April 2021, the regulator reiterated the alert after finding indications that the website continued to solicit residents.

In March 2026, the CVM rejected a second settlement proposal from IQ Option LLC in an administrative sanction proceeding concerning alleged unauthorised offering, intermediation and distribution of securities and alleged unjustified retention of investors' funds. The regulator said that a recent check indicated that the alleged conduct might have continued.

== Sponsorships ==
Earlier motorsport sponsorships by IQ Option included Aston Martin Racing in 2016 and Red Bull Racing in 2018. Since November 2022, IQ Option has been the official global sponsor of the Davis Cup. In September 2025, it signed a sponsorship agreement with United Autosports covering the FIA World Endurance Championship, the Asian Le Mans Series and the 24 Hours of Le Mans through 2026.

== See also ==
- List of electronic trading platforms
