= Crypto.com =

Singaporean cryptocurrency exchange company

- Type: Private
- Industry: Cryptocurrency
- Founded: June 30, 2016; 10 years ago
- Founders: Bobby Bao; Gary Or; Kris Marszalek; Rafael Melo
- Headquarters: 1 Raffles Quay, #25-01 Singapore 048583
- Products: Cryptocurrency exchange, cryptocurrencies
- Number of employees: 4,000 (2022)
- Website: www.crypto.com

Crypto.com is a Singaporean cryptocurrency exchange company that offers various financial services, including an app, exchange, and noncustodial DeFi wallet, NFT marketplace, and direct payment service in cryptocurrency. As of June 2023, the company reportedly had 100 million customers and 4,000 employees.

Crypto.com's user base increased from 10 million users in early 2021 to 100 million by mid-2024, while its workforce exceeded 4,000 employees. Regarding sponsorships and marketing activities, Crypto.com employed actor Matt Damon as a brand ambassador, collaborated with the soccer club Paris Saint-Germain F.C., and secured the naming rights for the Staples Center, now known as the Crypto.com Arena, in a 20-year agreement valued at $700 million.

Under the second Donald Trump administration, Crypto.com entered into business relationships with companies owned by the Trump family. At the same time, the administration eased regulatory efforts against Crypto.com regarding its customer practices.

== History ==
The company was initially founded in Hong Kong by Bobby Bao, Gary Or, Kris Marszalek, and Rafael Melo in 2016 as "Monaco". In 2018, the company was renamed as Crypto.com after purchasing the domain name from cryptography researcher and professor Matt Blaze. Domain sellers valued the domain at US$5–10 million.

Crypto.com is operated by Foris DAX Asia, a Singapore-based company that's a subsidiary of Foris DAX MT (Malta) Limited.

The company which had 10 million users in February 2021, reported more than 50 million active users as of May 2022 and 80 million users as of June 2023.

In January 2022, Crypto.com was the victim of a hack totaling US$15 million in stolen Ether. After some users reported suspicious activity on their accounts, the company paused withdrawals. Withdrawal services were later restored alongside a statement from the company that no customer funds were lost.

On August 18, 2022, it was reported that Crypto.com had been quietly letting go of hundreds of employees, beyond its initial 5% layoff in June, due to the downturn in the cryptocurrency market. By October 10, 2022, it was reported that Crypto.com had laid off over 2,000 employees (reportedly 30% to 40% of their staff) since May, due to the cryptocurrency market downturn.

In November 2022, the partnership exchange's token, Cronos, lost approximately $1 billion in value. The decline was caused in part due to concerns after the collapse of FTX, whose executive team was revealed to have used its native token, FTT, to prop up the balance sheet of a sister company and to have allegedly engaged in other fraudulent behaviors. On 14 November, Marszalek, the firm's CEO, assured users that the exchange was functioning as normal.

On June 9, 2023, Crypto.com announced plans to shut down its institutional exchange in the United States by June 21, citing low demand from large financial institutions. The company's main retail trading service was unaffected. The change caused speculation that the Crypto.com Arena in Los Angeles would be renamed, but the company denied this.

In December 2020, Crypto.com acquired The Card Group Pty Ltd, securing an Australian Financial Service License. This acquisition was approved by Australia’s Foreign Investment Review Board, enabling Crypto.com to operate within Australia's regulatory frameworks.

In December 2021, Crypto.com executed a sale and purchase agreement to acquire Nadex, a U.S.-based retail-focused, CFTC regulated online exchange, and the Small Exchange, known for offering simpler futures products. In October 2024, Crypto.com filed a lawsuit against the U.S. Securities and Exchange Commission after receiving a Wells notice from the same agency.

In December 2024, Crypto.com partnered with Deutsche Bank to offer corporate banking services in Singapore, Australia, and Hong Kong. Crypto.com also collaborated with Mastercard to expand digital payments in the GCC region.

Later that month, Crypto.com became the title sponsor of the Crypto.com Showdown, a golf match featuring PGA Tour players Rory McIlroy and Scottie Scheffler against LIV Golf players Bryson DeChambeau and Brooks Koepka, marking the first event to feature a crypto purse.

Also in 2025, the exchange launched services for institutional and advanced traders in the USA. Later that year, it introduced trading for stocks and ETFs.

In January 2025, Crypto.com received a Markets in Crypto Assets (MiCA) Licence and launched services for institutional and advanced traders in the USA.

In February 2025, the exchange launched the trading of stocks and ETF trading.

On 7 May 2025, Crypto.com opened a regional office in Washington, D.C., located near the White House, to build out its North America public and government affairs function and strengthen engagement with U.S. policymakers and regulators.

On 8 May 2025, Crypto.com Canada secured restricted dealer status, allowing it to continue providing crypto‑asset services across all Canadian provinces and territories while it pursues full registration as an investment dealer and membership with the Canadian Investment Regulatory Organisation (CIRO).

On 16 May 2025, Dubai’s Department of Finance announced a partnership with Crypto.com to allow government service fees to be paid using large‑cap cryptocurrencies, with payments securely converted into Emirati dirhams through the Crypto.com platform.

On 21 May 2025, Crypto.com acquired Cyprus‑based A.N. Allnew Investments Ltd to secure a Markets in Financial Instruments Directive (MiFID) license, enabling it to offer securities, derivatives, and contracts for difference across the European Economic Area.

On November 4, 2025, MyPrize announced a partnership with Crypto.com to launch MyPrize Markets, integrating Crypto.com’s CFTC-regulated prediction market contracts (on sports, politics, crypto, etc.) into its social gaming / sweepstakes casino platform.

In December 2025, Crypto.com entered into a partnership with DBS which allows Crypto.com users to deposit and withdraw Singapore Dollars and US Dollars via the bank. The cryptocurrency exchange platform will also be allowed to set up client money accounts for its customers.

On 3 February 2026, the company launched OG, a prediction market.

In February 2026, Kris Marszalek, co-founder and CEO of Crypto.com, bought the premium domain AI.com for about $70 million that became the largest publicly disclosed price ever paid for a website name, and announced plans to promote the purchase with a Super Bowl advertisement.

On 23 February, Crypto.com said that it had received conditional approval from the Office of the Comptroller of the Currency for a national trust bank charter, a first step for the company to become a federally regulated custodian.

In February, the Super Bowl LX advertisement for ai.com was ranked the most effective spot at the game across all categories by advertising analytics firm EDO, generating 9.1 times the median ad's consumer engagement based on brand searches, website visits, and app downloads.

On 3 March 2026, Crypto.com launched Crypto.com IRAs in the United States, the first crypto-native mixed-asset retirement account, allowing users to hold cryptocurrencies alongside equities and ETFs in a single tax-advantaged account.

On 17 March 2026, Crypto.com partnered with KG Inicis, South Korea's largest payment gateway with a 40% market share and over 400 million annual transactions, to enable foreign travellers to pay with digital assets via Crypto.com Pay across its merchant network.

In April 2026, Crypto.com's derivatives subsidiary, Crypto.com Derivatives North America (CDNA), entered into a partnership with High Roller Technologies to offer event-based prediction market contracts in the United States, covering finance, sports, and entertainment.

In May 2026, Crypto.com’s UAE entity, Foris DAX Middle East FZE, became the first virtual asset service provider to receive a Stored Value Facilities (SVF) licence from the Central Bank of the UAE, allowing it to offer regulated digital asset payments for government services. The licence enabled a partnership with Dubai Finance under which UAE residents could pay government service fees using digital assets, with settlements processed in UAE dirhams or dirham-backed stablecoins.

In June 2026, Crypto.com and its subsidiary, OG Prediction Markets, partnered with FanDuel Predicts. The partnership integrated Crypto.com's regulated clearinghouse infrastructure to expand FanDuel's event contract offerings.

In July 2026, Crypto.com reached a reported valuation of US$20 billion following an investment led by Citadel Securities, with participation from CapitalG and other investors.

In August 2026, Dubai Duty Free introduced Crypto.com Pay as a digital payment option at its stores in Dubai International Airport and online, becoming the first airport retailer in the Middle East to offer the service.

In September 2026, Crypto.com signed a partnership with Robinhood and OG.com to expand prediction market offerings. As part of the agreement, Robinhood acquired equity stakes in Crypto.com and OG.com and arranged to route certain event contracts through OG.com.

=== Relationship with Donald Trump ===
By 2025, Crypto.com had donated $11 million to Trump-related causes. In 2025, the Securities and Exchange Commission closed an investigation into Crypto.com.

In August 2025, Trump Media & Technology Group announced a strategic partnership with Crypto.com. Under the agreement, Trump Media planned to integrate Crypto.com’s digital wallet into its platforms, including Truth Social, enabling the conversion of in-app “gems” into Cronos (CRO). As part of the deal, Trump Media agreed to acquire approximately US$105 million worth of CRO tokens, while Crypto.com committed to invest US$50 million in Trump Media stock.

On 5 September 2025, Trump Media completed the purchase of 684.4 million CRO tokens, valued at about US$0.153 per token. The acquisition was financed through a combination of cash and Trump Media shares, both subject to a lock-up period.

On October 28, 2025, Truth Social (Trump Media) announced Truth Predict — a prediction-market feature integrated via Crypto.com’s U.S. derivatives arm (CDNA) that lets users bet on real-world events like elections, interest rates, commodities, and sports.

As of August 2026, the organization spent $38.6 million in support of Republican candidates in the 2026 United States elections, donating $35 million to MAGA Inc. and $2.3 million to support the senate campaign for Republican Andy Barr.

== Products ==
Cronos Token
Denominations
- Code: CRO
- Previous names: Crypto.com coin

Development
- White paper: Whitepaper
- Initial release: December 21, 2018; 7 years ago
- Development status: Active

Ledger
- Supply limit: 30,263,013,692

Valuation
- Exchange rate: Floating

Website
- Website: crypto.org

Crypto.com services include an app, exchange, wallet, and NFT marketplace.

In May 2022, they partnered with Shopify to allow businesses which use the e-commerce platform to accept payments in cryptocurrency.

On 28 July 2026, Emirates launched Crypto.com Pay on its website and mobile app, allowing eligible UAE residents to pay for flights using their Crypto.com digital wallets.

In August 2026, Crypto.com launched Tokenized Stocks, offering eligible users access to blockchain-based derivative contracts linked to the prices of U.S. stocks and exchange-traded funds.

In October 2026, Crypto.com launched Predict Pro, a platform for trading contracts based on real-world events. It included order books and combination markets for sporting events.

== Sponsorships ==
Crypto.com signed actor Matt Damon to serve as the company's brand ambassador in October 2021.

In March 2021, Crypto.com became a sponsor of the Aston Martin Cognizant Formula One Team. In May 2021, Crypto.com became the official sponsor of Italy's Coppa Italia soccer cup final.

In June 2021, Formula One announced a $100 million sponsorship deal with Crypto.com, marking the first cryptocurrency sponsorship in the sport.

In November 2021, the company acquired the naming rights to Los Angeles's Staples Center, renaming it Crypto.com Arena in a 20-year deal reported to be valued at US$700 million.

At the same time, Crypto.com announced a sponsorship deal with CONMEBOL, becoming an official partner of Latin America's leading soccer competition, the Copa Libertadores.

In early 2022, the company announced a partnership with the LeBron James Family Foundation to provide educational resources focused on blockchain-related topics to students of the I Promise School in Akron, Ohio. In March 2022, Crypto.com signed with FIFA to become an official sponsor of the 2022 FIFA World Cup in order to improve another global reach.

In November 2022, the Australian Football League (AFL) partnered with Crypto.com.

In April 2024, rapper Eminem promoted the Crypto.com exchange via twitter. He also provided the voice-over for the ad, which premiered on television during an NBA Playoffs game at the Crypto.com Arena.

Starting the 2024-27 cycle to improve global reach after signing sponsorships with FIFA, Formula One and UFC, Crypto.com dealt with UEFA to become official sponsors of the UEFA Champions League and UEFA Super Cup.

In June 2026, Crypto.com served as co-presenting partner of UFC Freedom 250, an event held at the White House grounds to mark the 250th anniversary of the United States. As part of the sponsorship, the company offered a $1 million bonus pool paid in CRO to fighters on the card.

At the same time, Crypto.com expanded its Commodity Futures Trading Commission (CFTC)-regulated derivatives and prediction market platform, OG Prediction Markets, into New York. The platform allows users to trade event contracts on sports, financial, and political outcomes. Also, the company signed National Basketball Association (NBA) player OG Anunoby as a brand ambassador to promote the New York launch.

== Regulations ==
=== North America ===
In North America, Crypto.com is licensed by Foreign MSB (Money Services Business) registrations with FINTRAC in Canada and FinCEN in the United States for AML compliance. Additionally, the service holds Money Transmitter Licenses across various U.S. states, allowing it to operate as a payment and virtual asset service provider.

In 2021, Crypto.com entered into a $216 million deal with IG Group, acquiring stakes in a US futures exchange and a binary trading group. This move aims to enable Crypto.com to offer derivatives and futures to US customers, an area often challenging for crypto exchanges due to the strict regulations surrounding these investment products. The acquisition includes the North American Derivatives Exchange (Nadex) and a 39% stake in Small Exchange, focusing on retail traders. This development is part of Crypto.com's broader strategy to comply with US regulations while expanding its service offerings.

On October 24, 2025, Crypto.com filed an application with the U.S. Office of the Comptroller of the Currency for a national trust bank charter, aiming to expand its federally regulated digital-asset custody services.

In December 2025, Crypto.com partnered with Fanatics to support the launch of Fanatics Markets, a prediction market platform in the United States; later that month, Crypto.com also partnered with e& money to explore regulated crypto trading, liquidity, and payment integrations.

In September 2026, Crypto.com registered with the U.S. Securities and Exchange Commission (SEC) to offer single-stock futures and announced plans to offer perpetual contracts based on U.S. stocks.

=== Australia ===
In December 2020, the company acquired an Australian Financial Services Licence by purchasing The Card Group Pty Ltd. This acquisition, approved by Australia’s Foreign Investment Review Board.

The Australian Financial Service License enables Crypto.com to expand its services in the Australian market, adhering to the country's financial regulations. This move also facilitates the introduction of new offerings, such as launching its debit card in Australia.

Crypto.com holds regulatory licenses, including an Australian Financial Services Licence (AFSL) and an Australian Credit License (ACL) issued by the Australian Securities and Investments Commission (ASIC). The company is also registered with AUSTRAC for AML/CTF compliance, providing designated services such as issuing stored value cards, financial products, and operating as a digital currency exchange service provider.

On 26 September 2025, Crypto.com announced that its U.S. subsidiary, Crypto.com Derivatives North America (CDNA), received approval from the Commodity Futures Trading Commission (CFTC) to offer cleared margined derivatives through an amended Derivatives Clearing Organization (DCO) license.

=== Asia ===
The Monetary Authority of Singapore announced that it had given in-principle approval to the company for a Major Payment Institution License, allowing it to provide digital payment token services in the country. In August 2022, Crypto.com acquired two South Korean startups - the payment service provider PnLink Co., Ltd and the virtual asset service provider OK-BIT Co., Ltd. With these acquisitions, the company secured registration licenses to provide financial services under South Korea's electronic financial transaction act and as a virtual asset service provider.

In June 2024, Crypto.com was recognized by Hong Kong's securities regulator as 'deemed to be licensed,' indicating that the exchange is close to obtaining full regulatory approval.

=== Europe ===
The company received approval from the United Kingdom's Financial Conduct Authority to be registered as a crypto asset service provider in August 2022. In July 2022, it received regulatory approval to operate in Cyprus from the Cyprus Securities and Exchange Commission. In September 2022, Crypto.com received the approval of the French authorities, and a month later announced plans to establish a European headquarters in Paris and invest 150 million euros in the French division.

The company operates under the EMI (Electronic Money Institution) license and has passporting rights across various European Economic Area (EEA) countries, including France, Slovenia, Spain, Sweden, etc. Additionally, Crypto.com holds VASP (Virtual Asset Service Provider) registrations in several European countries, adhering to the 5AMLD (Fifth Anti-Money Laundering Directive) regulations.

== See also ==
- Binance
- Kraken
- Coinbase
- BTCC (company)
