= Israel Securities Authority =

National securities regulator of Israel

- רשות ניירות ערך
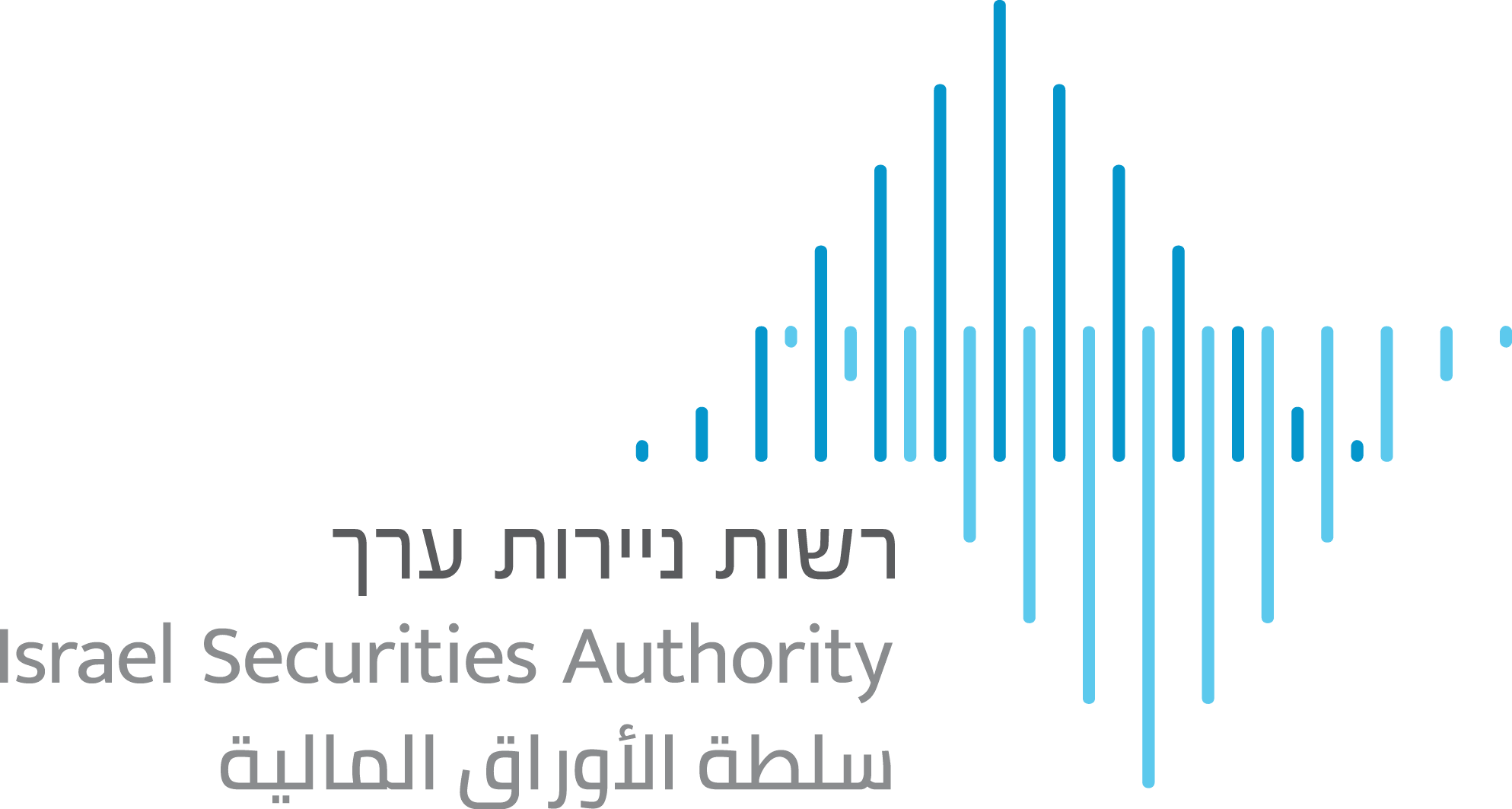

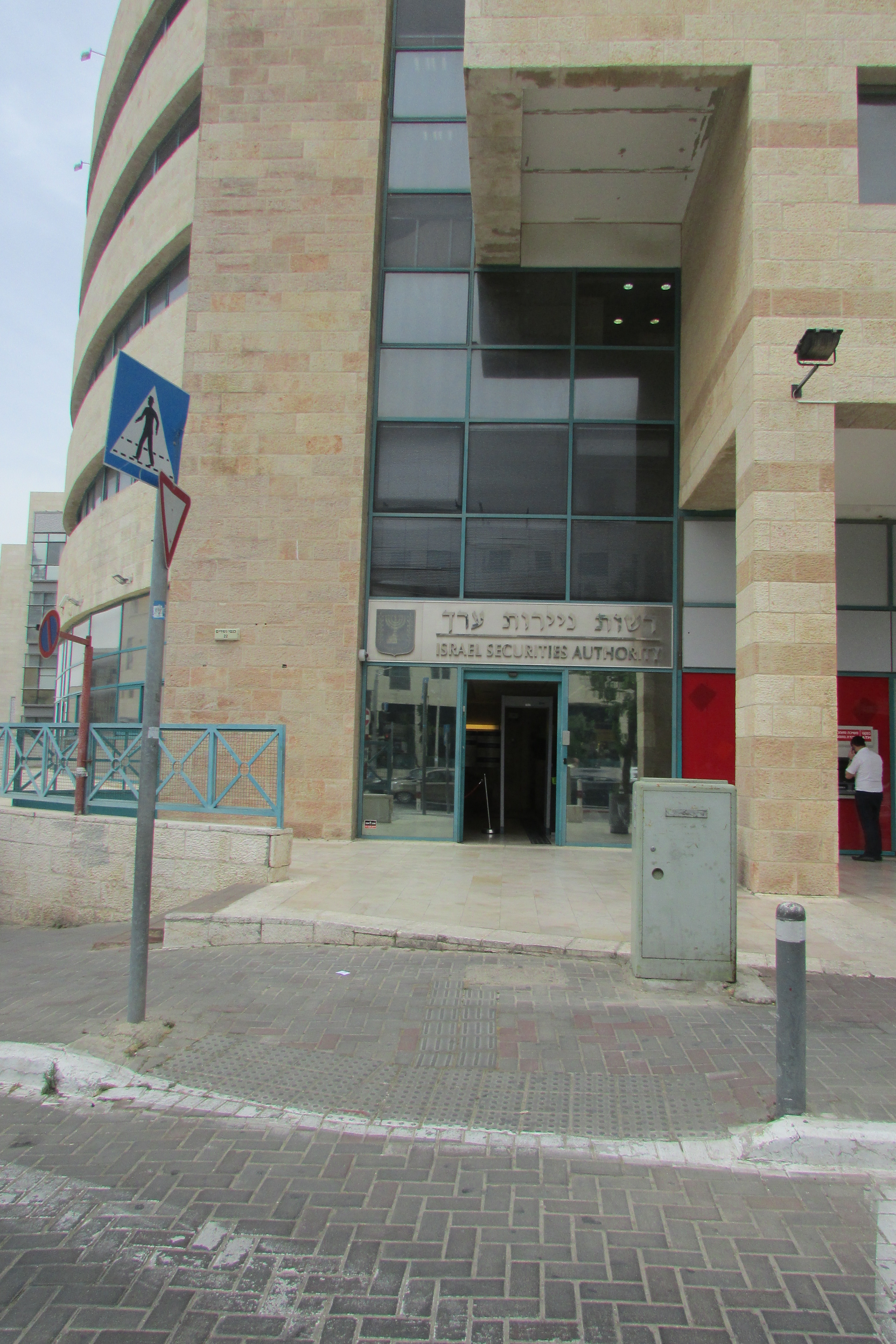

Agency overview
- Formed: 1968; 58 years ago
- Jurisdiction: Israel
- Headquarters: 22 Kanfei Nesharim Street, Jerusalem, Israel
- Agency executive: Anat Guetta, Chairperson (since January 2018)
- Website: isa.gov.il

The Israel Securities Authority (ISA; Hebrew: רשות ניירות ערך) is the national securities regulator of Israel. Established by law in 1968, the Israel Securities Authority sees its mandate as a way to ensure an efficient capital market based on transparency and fairness. The ISA works to fight against securities fraud, insider trading, questionable accounting practices and other activities which could harm Israel's capital marketplace and Israel's investor community.

== Establishment ==
The State of Israel was established in 1948, but securities trading had already begun there in 1935. Some leading pre-state banks, the Anglo-Palestine Bank, which later became Bank Leumi, and brokers traded on what was at the time an unofficial exchange, the Exchange Bureau for Securities.

On December 1, 1953, official trading began on the Tel Aviv Stock Exchange (TASE). Ten years later, a group of members of the Exchange created the TASE Clearing House. The Clearing House also acted as the central security depository in Israel. In 1968, the Knesset passed the Securities Law, which officially established the Israel Securities Authority, which became the modern regulatory framework for the Tel Aviv Stock Exchange and its operations.

== Mandate ==
The ISA closely models its practices on the basic principles established by US securities laws. These laws took shape in the wake of the Wall Street crash of 1929 and the Great Depression that followed in its wake. The overriding objective of securities legislation is the protection of the investor.

Israel's sole exchange is the Tel Aviv Stock Exchange. The authority reviews proposals to amend the stock exchange’s by-laws and recommends their adoption to the Minister of Finance and to the Knesset Finance Committee. It also approves the stock exchange's directives and rules, and amendments to them. In addition, the authority is engaged in the supervision of trade on the exchange, and in addressing inquiries by the public pertaining to the exchange's operations.

== Concerns about ISA inactivity in binary trading frauds ==
Reports from Israel and overseas have expressed concern that despite repeated calls, the ISA has not taken robust action over multimillion-dollar activity in binary trading schemes, which are reported to be often fraudulent. Canada and Australia have warned of 11 such binary trading firms, most if not all of which are Israel-based.

He said the goal is to make them lose as much money as possible. He tried to justify it by saying that people are dumb and this is what they want. – Times of Israel quote from a trainer of binary fund traders

According to the same source, there is widespread expectation within the binary trading industry that the ISA will take firm action to regulate them.

Natan Sharansky, head of the Jewish Agency, expressed dismay at the binary options scandal which he called repugnant, describing the industry as one which 'uses immoral methods to entice innocent victims'. He appealed for the ISA to close it down 'with all its power'.

The chair of the ISA, Professor Shmuel Hauser, also expressed his shame and disgust at the frauds and says they are working on it.

In 2016, Binary options were prohibited from being offered locally to Israelis, and the ISA has submitted a draft law seeking a blanket binary options ban to offerings to all investors, the legislation is required as the ISA doesn't currently have jurisdiction over offerings outside of Israel. In October 2017, the law was passed by the Knesset to forbid offering of binary options trading services to foreign customers. In January 2018, the parliamentary decision has been upheld in the Supreme Court of Israel.

== Combating unregulated offerings ==
In 2015–2017, following the collapse of alleged Ponzi schemes, namely Hilik Tapiro's Or Fund and Amir Bramly's Kela Fund, and a boom in unregulated activity due to harsh regulation on the one hand and the low interest rate on the other, the ISA has taken steps to prevent unregulated offerings to the public. These including warning the public of risks and prohibiting publication of financial details, including expected return, on any unregulated investment without issuing a prospectus.

== Senior staff ==
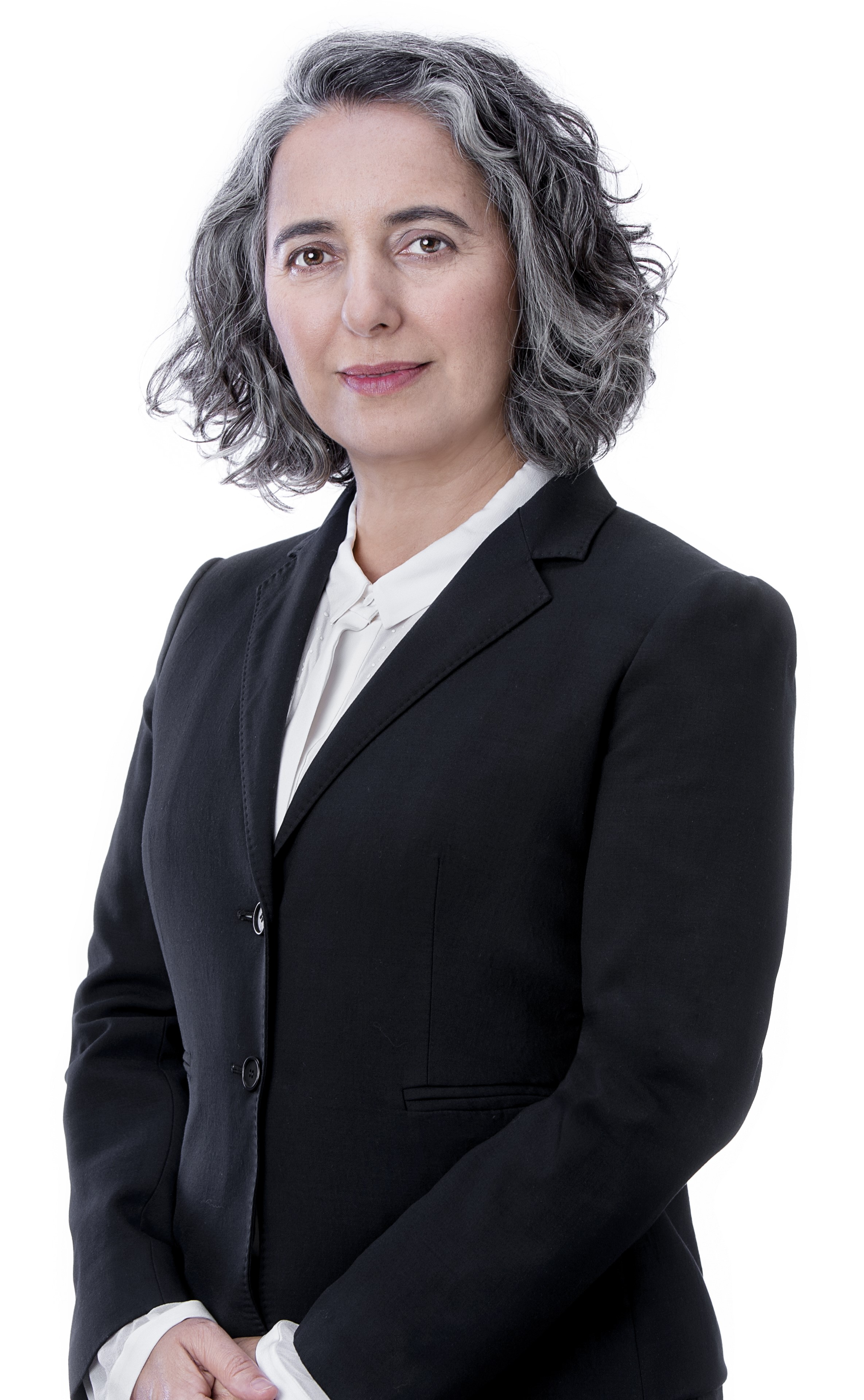
Anat Guetta, chair of the ISA since 2018

Anat Guetta has served as chair of the ISA since 2018. Other officials within the agency include:

- Moshe Tery, former chairman, appointed in 2002.
- Zvi Gabbay, former Head of Enforcement and a member of management.
- Senior Advisor to the chairman and Director of the International Affairs Department – Mr. Offir Eyal, Adv.
- General Counsel – Mr. Amir Wasserman, Adv.
- Head of Administrative Enforcement Department Director – Dr. Ilana Lipsker-Modai, Adv.
- Director of the stock Exchange and Trading Platforms Supervision Department – Mr. Ithzik Shurki, CPA
- Investment Department Director – Mr. Dudu Lavi
- Corporate Finance Department Director – Mrs. Dorit Kadosh, CPA.
- Director of the Securities Department of the Israel Securities Authority in the Tel Aviv District Attorney's office (taxation and economy) – Mrs. Judith Tirosh-Gross, Adv.
- Director of the Information Systems Department – Mr. Natan Hershkovitz
- Secretary General – Mr. Oded Spirer, Adv.
- Investigations, Intelligence, and Market Surveillance Department Director – Mrs. Zippi Gez, Adv.
- Deputy General Counsel – Mrs. Sarah Kandler, Adv.
- Spokeswoman and Head of Investor Education Unit – Ms. Hadar Horen
- ISA Chief Economist and Strategic Advisor – Mr. Ilan Gildin

== See also ==
- Securities Commission
- List of financial supervisory authorities by country
