= Moshe Tery =

Israeli economist

- משה טרי

Chairman of Israel Securities Authority
- In office 2002–2008
- Appointed by: Silvan Shalom

Personal details
- Occupation: Business executive

Moshe Tery (Hebrew: משה טרי) was Chairman of the Israel Securities Authority. He was initially appointed in 2002 by then-Israeli Finance Minister Silvan Shalom.

== Career ==
Positions he has held include:

- Chairman of Leadcom Ltd. (Elgadcom Group)
- General manager of the Central Co. Stock Exchange Services (N.E.) Ltd.
- General manager of the Israel Investment Center
- Vice Director General of Edgar Textile Industries Ltd.
- Director of the Tel Aviv Stock Exchange
- Director of Israel Chemicals Ltd.
- Chairman of Laromme Hotels International Ltd.
- Chief Economist in the Securities Division of the Israel Discount Bank

== Government appointments ==
His government appointments include:

- Commissioner of the Israel Securities Authority
- General Manager of the Israel Postal Authority
- Director of the Israel Airport Authority
