= Independent Reserve =

Australian digital currency exchange

- Type: Private
- Founded: June 2013; 13 years ago
- Founder: Adrian Przelozny, Adam Tepper
- Headquarters: Sydney, New South Wales, Australia
- Area served: 36 countries
- Website: Independent Reserve

Independent Reserve is an Australian-based digital currency exchange founded in 2013. They are an order book exchange and an OTC desk.

== History ==
Independent Reserve was founded in June 2013 by Adrian Przelozny and Adam Tepper. It started operating in October 2014. In February 2015, Adam died in a motorcycle accident and Adrian Przelozny took over as CEO. In 2018, Mike Tilley along with KTM Ventures invested into Independent Reserve for 25 percent of the company.

In March 2018, the OTC desk was launched. In February 2019, Independent Reserve was the first Australian digital asset exchange to offer insurance on cryptocurrency assets. In January 2020, Independent Reserve announced its expansion into Singapore, citing regulatory conditions. In August 2021, the platform secured an approval from the Monetary Authority of Singapore that will allow it to offer digital payment token services.

In December 2021, Independent Reserve partnered with the Sydney Swans team and signed a one-year arrangement as the “Official Cryptocurrency Exchange of the Sydney Swans”.

In March 2023, Independent Reserve acquired a cryptocurrency exchange brand Bitcoin.com.au in a deal worth $3 million. In August 2023, Independent Reserve signed a partnership with PayPal, to enable users to send Australian dollars using a credit card or their PayPal account.

In January 2026, it was announced that Independent Reserve had been acquired by IG Group Holdings plc, with the transaction completing on 30 January 2026 following regulatory approval from the Monetary Authority of Singapore. The acquisition, first announced in September 2025, formed part of IG Group’s expansion into regulated cryptocurrency trading and retained Independent Reserve as its underlying crypto trading infrastructure.

== Bitcoin.com.au ==
Bitcoin.com.au
- Type: private
- Founded: 2015
- Headquarters: Sydney, New South Wales, Australia
- Area served: Australia
- Key people: Adrian Przelozny (CEO)
- Website: https://bitcoin.com.au/

Bitcoin.com.au is an Australian cryptocurrency exchange platform founded in by Rupert Hackett, then purchased from Banxa by Independent Reserve in 2023.

On 20 June 2016, Bitcoin.com.au partnered with BlueShyft.

On August 2, 2017, the platform raised $815,000 in series A funding to expand globally and added Ethereum and XRP to its exchange.

On July 13, 2018, Ben Ingram, an Australian PwC director, became the new CEO.

In June 2020, the company partnered with Australia Post, making Bitcoin purchases available at any post offices across Australia.

In March 2023, Bitcoin.com.au became a major sponsor of the Sydney Swans. In the same month, the platform was purchased by a Sydney-based cryptocurrency company called Independent Reserve for $3M, as announced by its CEO Adrian Przelozny.

In August 2023, Bitcoin.com.au partnered with PayPal, becoming the first digital exchange in Australia to integrate with the mentioned platform as a funding option.
