= Zvi Gabbay =

Israeli lawyer

- צבי גבאי
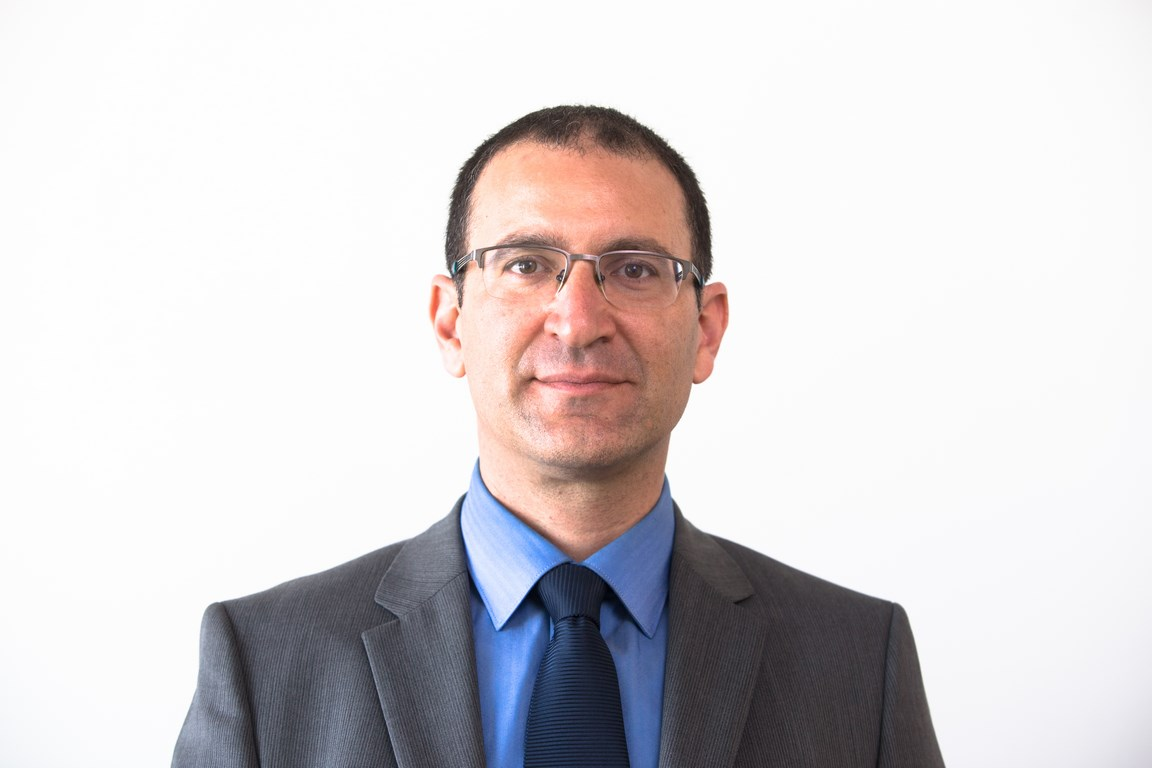
- Education: Hebrew University of Jerusalem, Bar-Ilan University, Columbia University
- Occupations: Lawyer, Partner and Head of Capital Markets and Financial Regulation Department at Shibolet & Co.

Zvi Gabbay (Hebrew: צבי גבאי) is an Israeli lawyer specializing in securities regulation and financial law. He is a partner at Shibolet & Co. and previously served as Head of Enforcement and a member of management at the Israel Securities Authority (ISA), and as partner and the head of the Capital Markets and Financial Regulation Department at Barnea & Co.

== Education ==
Upon completing his military service as an officer and combatant in the Nahal Infantry Brigade of the Israel Defense Forces, Gabbay studied law at the Hebrew University of Jerusalem, where he earned his Bachelor of Laws (LL.B.). He subsequently received a Master of Laws (LL.M.) degree from Bar-Ilan University and another LL.M. from Columbia University in 2004. In 2006, he completed a Doctor of Juridical Science (J.S.D.) degree at Columbia University. His doctoral research examined alternatives to criminal proceedings, including administrative law and restorative justice.

== Public activities ==
Gabbay was a member of a committee assembled by Minister of Justice Yaakov Neeman and chaired by Deputy Attorney-General Raz Nazari to examine the legal framework governing corporate criminal liability. The committee published a memorandum for the draft bill Criminal Liability for Corporations Law (2014).

Gabbay is currently a member of the board of governors of the International Institute for Restorative Practices (IIRP) Europe.

Gabbay is also a member of the board of governors of Amutat Kedem, an Israeli NPO that engages in conciliatory processes using family group conferences and restorative justice to help children at-risk youth, and youth offenders.

During his residence in the United States, Gabbay engaged in volunteer work, mediating more than 50 cases in the various courts in New York. He also served as a moderator and mediator in the Community Impact Panel program, which convened at the Midtown Community Court in Manhattan. Gabbay volunteers as a mediator in business disputes in Israeli courts.

== Career ==
Gabbay began his legal career as a prosecutor in the criminal department of the Tel Aviv District Attorney’s Office. Upon completing his studies in New York, Gabbay joined the international law firm Skadden, Arps, Slate, Meagher & Flom LLP. During his tenure at the firm, Gabbay focused on representing private and business clients undergoing internal investigations, working in collaboration with the firm’s civil litigation department.

Gabbay returned to Israel in 2008 and was appointed the Head of Enforcement and a member of management at the Israel Securities Authority (ISA). During his tenure, he was involved in the development and implementation of the authority’s administrative enforcement framework, and participated in the legislative work that led to the introduction of administrative enforcement mechanisms for violations of securities law.

In 2011, Gabbay left the ISA and became a partner at the Gornitzky and Co. law firm. Two years later, in 2013, he resigned and co-founded Adini, Berger, Gabbay, a law firm specializing in capital markets.

In 2016, Gabbay joined Barnea & Co., where he became a partner and headed its capital markets practice.

In May 2026, Gabbay left Barnea & Co. and joined Shibolet & Co. together with several other lawyers from the firm.

=== Academic lectures ===
Gabbay was a guest lecturer at the College of Law and Business, where he taught a seminar on white collar crime. He has also lectured at both the School of Law at the College of Management and the School of Law at Columbia University on mediation and negotiations.

=== Books ===
- Administrative Enforcement of Israeli Securities Laws, Bursi Publishing House, 2012.
