= Nadex =

US-based derivatives exchange

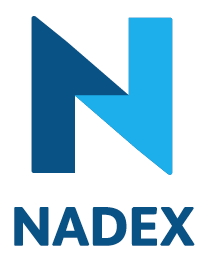
- Company type: Private
- Industry: Finance
- Founded: 2004
- Founder: John Nafeh
- Headquarters: Chicago, Illinois, United States
- Area served: United States
- Key people: Marcus Dees, CEO
- Products: Binary options, Knock-outs, and Call Spreads
- Services: Derivatives exchange
- Owner: Crypto.com
- Number of employees: 50
- Website: www.nadex.com

Nadex (Northern American Derivatives Exchange), formerly known as HedgeStreet, is a US-based retail-focused online binary options exchange. It offers retail trading of binary options and spreads on the most heavily traded forex, commodities and stock indices markets.

== History ==
Nadex originally was known as "HedgeStreet" and was based in San Mateo, California. The Exchange was launched in 2004 offering an electronic marketplace that offered trading in financial derivatives to retail investors. HedgeStreet shut down its business in late 2007. Shortly thereafter, UK-based IG Group Holdings plc. agreed to purchase HedgeStreet, Inc. for $6 million and began restructuring the exchange, its technology, and its products. In 2009, HedgeStreet was renamed as the North American Derivatives Exchange (Nadex).

HedgeStreet was considered a pioneer in event futures, and the derivatives exchange is regulated in the US by the Commodity Futures Trading Commission (CFTC). The company operates the HedgeStreet Exchange, which launched in October 2004 and provides traders with a place where they can hedge against or speculate on economic events and price movements. The reasoning behind the creation of HedgeStreet was that with the rise of individual private investment in stocks, there might be a similar appetite for individuals to invest in derivatives. This focus on small investors created sufficient confusion that John Nafeh, founder of HedgeStreet, created the term "hedgelet" to help explain the company's business model.

In 2007, UK-based IG Group announced intent to acquire HedgeStreet and later in the year completed the purchase of the company. After the purchase, Nadex began to offer binary options similar to those already available on IG's platform.

In December 2021, Singapore-based Crypto.com announced their intent to acquire Nadex and the Small Exchange from IG Group. In March 2022, Crypto.com completed the purchase.

== See also ==
- Prediction market
- Kalshi
- PredictIt
- Polymarket
