= Binary option =

Financial exotic option with an all-or-nothing payoff

A binary option is a financial exotic option in which the payoff is either some fixed monetary amount or nothing at all. The two main types of binary options are the cash-or-nothing binary option and the asset-or-nothing binary option. The former pays some fixed amount of cash if the option expires in-the-money while the latter pays the value of the underlying security. They are also called all-or-nothing options, digital options (more common in forex/interest rate markets), and fixed return options (FROs) (on the NYSE American).

While binary options may be used in theoretical asset pricing, they are prone to fraud in their applications and hence banned by regulators in many jurisdictions as a form of gambling. Many binary option outlets have been exposed as fraudulent. The U.S. FBI is investigating binary option scams throughout the world, and the Israeli police have tied the industry to criminal syndicates. The European Securities and Markets Authority (ESMA) has banned retail binary options trading. Australian Securities & Investments Commission (ASIC) considers binary options as a "high-risk" and "unpredictable" investment option, and finally also banned binary options sale to retail investors in 2021.

The FBI estimates that the scammers steal US$10 billion annually worldwide. The use of the names of famous and respectable people such as Richard Branson to encourage people to buy fake "investments" is frequent and increasing. Articles published in The Times of Israel newspaper explain the fraud in detail, using the experience of former insiders such as a job-seeker recruited by a fake binary options broker, who was told to "leave [his] conscience at the door". Following an investigation by The Times of Israel, Israel's cabinet approved a ban on the sale of binary options in June 2017, and a law banning the products was approved by the Knesset in October 2017.

On January 30, 2018, Facebook banned advertisements for binary options trading as well as for cryptocurrencies and initial coin offerings (ICOs). Google and Twitter announced similar bans in the following weeks.

== Function ==
Binary options "are based on a simple 'yes' or 'no' proposition: Will an underlying asset be above a certain price at a certain time?" Traders place wagers as to whether that will or will not happen. If a customer believes the price of an underlying asset will be above a certain price at a set time, the trader buys the binary option, but if he or she believes it will be below that price, they sell the option. In the U.S. exchanges, the price of a binary is always under $100.

Investopedia described the binary options trading process in the U.S. thus:

[A] binary may be trading at $42.50 (bid) and $44.50 (offer) at 1 p.m. If you buy the binary option right then you will pay $44.50, if you decide to sell right then you'll sell at $42.50.

Let's assume you decide to buy at $44.50. If at 1:30 p.m. the price of gold is above $1,250, your option expires and it becomes worth $100. You make a profit of $100 – $44.50 = $55.50 (less fees). This is called being "in the money".

But if the price of gold is below $1,250 at 1:30 p.m., the option expires at $0. Therefore you lose the $44.50 invested. This is called being "out of the money".

The bid and offer fluctuate until the option expires. You can close your position at any time before expiry to lock in a profit or a reduce a loss (compared to letting it expire out of the money).

In the U.S., every binary option settles at $100 or $0, $100 if the bet is correct, 0 if it is not.

In the online binary options industry, where the contracts are sold by a broker to a customer in an OTC manner, a different option pricing model is used. Brokers sell binary options at a fixed price (e.g., $100) and offer some fixed percentage return in case of in-the-money settlement. Some brokers, also offer a sort of out-of-money reward to a losing customer. For example, with a win reward of 80%, out-of-money reward of 5%, and the option price of $100, two scenarios are possible. In-the-money settlement pays back the option price of $100 and the reward of $80. In case of loss, the option price is not returned but the out-of-money reward of $5 is granted to the customer.

On non-regulated platforms, client money is not necessarily kept in a trust account, as required by government financial regulation, and transactions are not monitored by third parties in order to ensure fair play.

Binary options are often considered a form of gambling rather than investment because of their negative cumulative payout (the brokers have an edge over the investor) and because they are advertised as requiring little or no knowledge of the markets. Gordon Pape, writing in Forbes.com in 2010, called binary options websites "gambling sites, pure and simple", and said "this sort of thing can quickly become addictive... no one, no matter how knowledgeable, can consistently predict what a stock or commodity will do within a short time frame".

Pape observed that binary options are poor from a gambling standpoint as well because of the excessive "house edge". One online binary options site paid $71 for each successful $100 trade. "If you lose, you get back $15. Let's say you make 1,000 "trades" and win 545 of them. Your profit is $38,695. But your 455 losses will cost you $38,675. In other words, you must win 54.5% of the time just to break even".

The U.S. Commodity Futures Trading Commission warns that "some binary options Internet-based trading platforms may overstate the average return on investment by advertising a higher average return on investment than a customer should expect given the payout structure."

== Black–Scholes valuation ==
In the Black–Scholes model, the price of the option can be found by the formulas below. In fact, the Black–Scholes formula for the price of a vanilla call option (or put option) can be interpreted by decomposing a call option into an asset-or-nothing call option minus a cash-or-nothing call option, and similarly for a put – the binary options are easier to analyze, and correspond to the two terms in the Black–Scholes formula.

In these, S is the initial stock price, K denotes the strike price, T is the time to maturity, q is the dividend rate, r is the risk-free interest rate and $\sigma$ is the volatility. $\Phi$ denotes the cumulative distribution function of the normal distribution,

$$\Phi(x) = \frac{1}{\sqrt{2 \pi}} \int_{-\infty}^x e^{-z^2/2} dz.$$

and,

$$d_1 = \frac{\ln\frac{S}{K} + (r-q+\sigma^{2}/2)T}{\sigma\sqrt{T}}.$$
$$d_2 = d_1-\sigma\sqrt{T}.$$

=== Cash-or-nothing call ===
This pays out one unit of cash if the spot is above the strike at maturity. Its value now is given by

$$C = e^{-rT}\Phi(d_2). \,$$

=== Cash-or-nothing put ===
This pays out one unit of cash if the spot is below the strike at maturity. Its value now is given by

$$P = e^{-rT}\Phi(-d_2). \,$$

=== Asset-or-nothing call ===
This pays out one unit of asset if the spot is above the strike at maturity. Its value now is given by

$$C = Se^{-qT}\Phi(d_1). \,$$

=== Asset-or-nothing put ===
This pays out one unit of asset if the spot is below the strike at maturity. Its value now is given by:

$$P = Se^{-qT}\Phi(-d_1). \,$$

=== American style ===
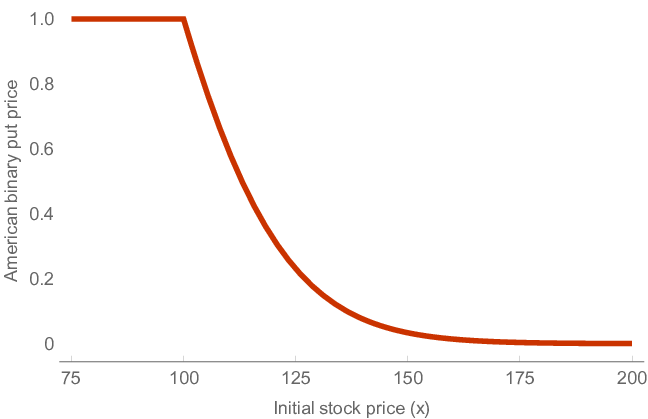
American binary put with K = 100, r = 0.04, σ = 0.2, T = 1

An American option gives the holder the right to exercise at any point up to and including the expiry time $T$. That is, denoting by $K$ the strike price, if $K\geq S$ (resp. $K\leq S$), the corresponding American binary put (resp. call) is worth exactly one unit. Let

$$a=\frac{1}{\sigma}\ln(K/S)\text{, }\xi=\frac{r-q}{\sigma}-\frac{\sigma}{2}\text{, and }b=\sqrt{\xi^{2}+2r}. \,$$

The price of a cash-or-nothing American binary put (resp. call) with strike $K<S$ (resp. $K>S$) and time-to-expiry $T$ is:

$$\frac{1}{2}e^{a\left(\xi-b\right)}\left\{ 1+\operatorname{sgn}(a)\operatorname{erf}\left(\frac{bT-a}{\sqrt{2T}}\right)+e^{2ab}\left[1-\operatorname{sgn}(a)\operatorname{erf}\left(\frac{bT+a}{\sqrt{2T}}\right)\right]\right\} \,$$

where $\operatorname{erf}$ denotes the error function and $\operatorname{sgn}$ denotes the sign function. The above follows immediately from expressions for the Laplace transform of the distribution of the conditional first passage time of Brownian motion to a particular level.

=== Foreign exchange ===
If we denote by S the FOR/DOM exchange rate (i.e., 1 unit of foreign currency is worth S units of domestic currency) we can observe that paying out 1 unit of the domestic currency if the spot at maturity is above or below the strike is exactly like a cash-or nothing call and put respectively. Similarly, paying out 1 unit of the foreign currency if the spot at maturity is above or below the strike is exactly like an asset-or nothing call and put respectively. Hence if we now take $r_{\mathrm{FOR}}$, the foreign interest rate, $r_{DOM}$, the domestic interest rate, and the rest as above, we get the following results.

In case of a digital call (this is a call FOR/put DOM) paying out one unit of the domestic currency we get as present value,

$$C = e^{-r_{\mathrm{DOM}} T}\Phi(d_2) \,$$

In case of a digital put (this is a put FOR/call DOM) paying out one unit of the domestic currency we get as present value,

$$P = e^{-r_{\mathrm{DOM}}T}\Phi(-d_2) \,$$

While in case of a digital call (this is a call FOR/put DOM) paying out one unit of the foreign currency we get as present value,

$$C = Se^{-r_{\mathrm{FOR}} T}\Phi(d_1) \,$$

and in case of a digital put (this is a put FOR/call DOM) paying out one unit of the foreign currency we get as present value,

$$P = Se^{-r_{\mathrm{FOR}}T}\Phi(-d_1) \,$$

=== Skew ===
In the standard Black–Scholes model, one can interpret the premium of the binary option in the risk-neutral world as the expected value = probability of being in-the-money * unit, discounted to the present value. The Black–Scholes model relies on symmetry of distribution and ignores the skewness of the distribution of the asset. Market makers adjust for such skewness by, instead of using a single standard deviation for the underlying asset $\sigma$ across all strikes, incorporating a variable one $\sigma(K)$ where volatility depends on strike price, thus incorporating the volatility skew into account. The skew matters because it affects the binary considerably more than the regular options.

A binary call option is, at long expirations, similar to a tight call spread using two vanilla options. One can model the value of a binary cash-or-nothing option, C, at strike K, as an infinitesimally tight spread, where $C_v$ is a vanilla European call:

$$C = \lim_{\epsilon \to 0} \frac{C_v(K-\epsilon) - C_v(K)}{\epsilon}$$

Thus, the value of a binary call is the negative of the derivative of the price of a vanilla call with respect to strike price:

$$C = -\frac{dC_v}{dK}$$

When one takes volatility skew into account, $\sigma$ is a function of $K$:

$$C = -\frac{dC_v(K,\sigma(K))}{dK} = -\frac{\partial C_v}{\partial K} - \frac{\partial C_v}{\partial \sigma} \frac{\partial \sigma}{\partial K}$$

The first term is equal to the premium of the binary option ignoring skew:

$$-\frac{\partial C_v}{\partial K} = -\frac{\partial (S\Phi(d_1) - Ke^{-rT}\Phi(d_2))}{\partial K} = e^{-rT}\Phi(d_2) = C_{\mathrm{noskew}}$$

$\frac{\partial C_v}{\partial \sigma}$ is the Vega of the vanilla call; $\frac{\partial \sigma}{\partial K}$ is sometimes called the "skew slope" or just "skew". Skew is typically negative, so the value of a binary call is higher when taking skew into account.

$$C = C_{\mathrm{noskew}} - \mathrm{Vega}_v * \mathrm{Skew}$$

=== Relationship to vanilla options' Greeks ===
Since a binary call is a mathematical derivative of a vanilla call with respect to strike, the price of a binary call has the same shape as the delta of a vanilla call, and the delta of a binary call has the same shape as the gamma of a vanilla call.

== Regulation and fraud ==
Many binary option "brokers" have been exposed as fraudulent operations. In those cases, there is no real brokerage; the customer is betting against the broker, who is acting as a bucket shop. Manipulation of price data to cause customers to lose is common. Withdrawals are regularly stalled or refused by such operations; if a client has good reason to expect a payment, the operator will simply stop taking their phone calls. Though binary options sometimes trade on regulated exchange, they are generally unregulated, trading on the Internet, and prone to fraud. Most of the binary options brokers are registered in Saint Vincent and the Grenadines and offering their services globally. The country's Financial Services Authority has issued a warning to the general public about unlicensed Forex and binary options trading provided by entities registered in Saint Vincent and the Grenadines.

=== European Union ===
On 23 March 2018, The European Securities and Markets Authority, a European Union financial regulatory institution and European Supervisory Authority located in Paris, agreed to new temporary rules prohibiting the marketing, distribution or sale of binary options to retail clients.

=== Australia ===
The Australian Securities & Investments Commission (ASIC) warned Australian investors on 13 February 2015 against Opteck, an unlicensed binary option provider. The ASIC later began a focused effort to control unlicensed derivative providers, including "review" websites, broker affiliates, and managed service providers related to binary option products. ASIC finally released a ban on sale of binary options to retail clients in 2021.

=== Belgium ===
In August 2016, Belgium's Financial Services and Markets Authority banned binary options schemes, based on concerns about widespread fraud.

=== Canada ===
No firms are registered in Canada to offer or sell binary options, so no binary options trading is currently allowed. Provincial regulators have proposed a complete ban on all binary options trading include a ban on online advertising for binary options trading sites. A complete ban on binary options trading for options having an expiration less than 30 days was announced on September 28, 2017.

=== Cyprus ===
On May 3, 2012, the Cyprus Securities and Exchange Commission (CySEC) announced a policy change regarding the classification of binary options as financial instruments. The effect is that binary options platforms operating in Cyprus, where many of the platforms are now based, would have to be CySEC regulated within six months of the date of the announcement. CySEC was the first EU MiFID-member regulator to treat binary options as financial instruments.

In 2013, CySEC prevailed over the disreputable binary options brokers and communicated intensively with traders in order to prevent the risks of using unregulated financial services. On September 19, 2013, CySEC sent out a press release warning investors against binary options broker TraderXP, who was not and had never been licensed by CySEC. On October 18, 2013, CySEC released an investor warning about binary options broker NRGbinary and its parent company NRG Capital (CY) Ltd., stating that NRGbinary was not and had never been licensed by CySEC.

CySEC also temporarily suspended the license of the Cedar Finance on December 19, 2013, because the potential violations referenced appeared to seriously endanger the interests of the company's customers and the proper functioning of capital markets, as described in the official issued press release. CySEC also issued a warning against binary option broker PlanetOption at the end of the year and another warning against binary option broker LBinary on January 10, 2014, pointing out that it was not regulated by the Commission and the Commission had not received any notification by any of its counterparts in other European countries to the effect of this firm being a regulated provider.

The Cyprus regulator imposed a penalty of €15,000 against ZoomTrader. OptionBravo and ChargeXP were also financially penalized. CySEC also indicated that it had voted to reject the ShortOption license application.

In 2015, CySEC repeatedly fined Banc De Binary for several violations including the solicitation of U.S. clients. In 2016, the regulator fined Banc De Binary Ltd once again for violation of its legislation. The broker has come to a settlement of €350,000.

=== France ===
In August 2016, France's Sapin II bill on transparency was announced by the Autorité des Marchés Financiers (AMF), seeking to outlaw all financial derivatives advertising. The AMF stated that it would ban the advertising of certain highly speculative and risky financial contracts to private individuals by electronic means. The document applies specifically to binary options, and to contracts for difference (CFDs), and financial contracts on currencies. The French regulator is determined to cooperate with the legal authorities to have illegal websites blocked. The law also prohibits all forms of sponsorship and partnership that results in direct or indirect advertising of the financial products it covers. This ban was seen by industry watchers as having an impact on sponsored sports such as European football clubs.

The Cyprus-based company 24Option was banned from trading in France by AMF earlier in 2016. They had sponsored a well-known Irish mixed martial artist, Conor McGregor, who in turn promoted the company through social media.

=== Germany ===
German Federal Financial Supervisory Authority (BaFin) has been regularly publishing investor warnings. On November 29, 2018, BaFin announced that it is planning to "prohibit the marketing, distribution and sale of binary options to retail clients at a national level".

=== Indonesia ===
According to the Commodity Futures Trading Regulatory Agency (CoFTRA) in Indonesia, also known as BAPPEBTI, binary options are considered a form of online gambling and is illegal in the country. The move to delegalize binary options stems from concerns that the public may be swayed by misleading advertisements, promotions, and offers to participate in fraudulent practices that operate under the guise of binary options trading. As of 2 February 2022, at least 92 binary options websites, including Binomo, IQ Option, and Olymp Trade, have been classified as unlicensed operators and blocked by the Indonesian government.

=== Israel ===
Binary options trading

In March 2016 binary options trading within Israel was banned by the Israel Securities Authority, on the grounds that such trading is essentially gambling and not a form of investment management. The ban was extended to overseas clients as well in October 2017. It was approved by the Knesset in October, despite strong opposition from the binary options industry.

Fraud

In 2016 The Times of Israel ran several articles on binary options fraud. "The wolves of Tel Aviv: Israel's vast, amoral binary options scam exposed" revealed that the industry is a scam. A second article describes in detail how a binary options salesman fleeced clients. "According to one ex-employee of a firm that employs over 1,000 people in a high-rise office building in Tel Aviv, losses are guaranteed because the 'dealing room' at the binary options firm controls the trading platform—like the crooked ownership of a rigged casino manipulating the roulette wheel".

In July 2016 the Israeli binary option firms Vault Options and Global Trader 365 were ordered by the U.S. District Court for the Northern District of Illinois to pay more than $4.5 million for unlawful off-exchange binary options trading, fraud, and registration violations. The companies were also banned permanently from operating in the United States or selling to U.S. residents.

In November 2016 the Israel Securities Authority carried out a raid on the Ramat Gan offices of binary option broker iTrader. The CEO and six other employees were charged with fraud, providing unlicensed investment advice, and obstruction of justice.

On May 15, 2017, Eliran Saada, the owner of Express Target Marketing, which has operated the binary options companies InsideOption and SecuredOptions, was arrested on suspicion of fraud, false accounting, forgery, extortion, and blackmail. The case involves a Singaporean woman who claims to have lost over $500,000 to the firm.

In August 2017 Israeli police superintendent Rafi Biton said that the binary trading industry had "turned into a monster". He told the Israeli Knesset that criminal investigations had begun.

In September 2017, the FBI arrested Lee Elbaz, CEO of binary options trading company Yukom Communications, upon her arrival in the United States. They arrested her for wire fraud and conspiracy to commit wire fraud. In 2019, Lee Elbaz was found guilty and sentenced to 22 years in prison.

In February 2019, the FBI arrested Austin Smith, founder of Wealth Recovery International, after his arrival in the United States. Smith was arrested for wire fraud due to his involvement as an employee of Binarybook.com.

=== Malta ===
In March 2013 the Malta Financial Services Authority (MFSA) announced that binary options regulation would be transferred away from Malta's Lottery and Gaming Authority. On 18 June 2013 MFSA confirmed that in their view binary options fell under the scope of the Markets in Financial Instruments Directive (MiFID), which made Malta the second EU jurisdiction to regulate binary options as a financial instrument. This required providers to obtain a category 3 Investment Services license and conform to MiFID's minimum capital requirements; firms could previously operate from the jurisdiction with a valid Lottery and Gaming Authority license.

=== New Zealand ===
In April 2017, New Zealand's Financial Markets Authority (FMA) announced that all brokers that offer short-term investment instruments that settle within three days are required to obtain a license from the agency. This is intended to cover binary options as well as contracts for difference (CFDs).

=== United Kingdom ===
Binary options trading

In the UK, binary options were regulated by the Gambling Commission rather than the Financial Conduct Authority (FCA). This regulation, however, applied only to firms that have gambling equipment in the UK. The FCA in 2016 did propose bringing binary options under its jurisdiction and restricting them. They stated that binary options "did not appear to meet a genuine investment need". In March 2017, Action Fraud issued a warning on binary options.

The Isle of Man, a self-governing Crown dependency for which the UK is responsible, has issued licenses to companies offering binary options as "games of skill" licensed and regulated under fixed odds betting by the Isle of Man Gambling Supervision Commission (GSC). This positions binary options as a form of gambling, and the administrator of the trading as something akin to a casino, as opposed to an exchange or brokerage house.

On October 19, 2017, London police raided 20 binary options firms in London. On January 3, 2018, the FCA took over regulation of binary options from the Gambling Commission. In December 2018, FCA has proposed new rules which would permanently ban the sale, marketing and distribution of binary options to retail consumers.

Fraud

Fraud within the market is rife, with many binary options providers using the names of famous and respectable people without their knowledge. According to a national fraud and cybercrime reporting centre Action Fraud, 664 binary options frauds were reported in 2015/16, increasing to 1,474 in 2016/17. The City of London police in May 2017 said that reported losses for the previous financial year were £13 million, increased from £2 million the year before. In the first half of 2017, 697 people reported losses totaling over £18 million.

=== United States ===
Binary options trading

In the United States, the Securities and Exchange Commission (SEC) approved exchange-traded binary options in 2008. Trading commenced on the NYSE American (MYSEA) and the Chicago Board Options Exchange (CBOE) in May and June 2008.

The MYSEA offers binary options on some exchange-traded funds and a few highly liquid equities such as Citigroup and Google. On the exchange binary options were called "fixed return options" (FROs). To reduce the threat of market manipulation of single stocks, FROs use a "settlement index" defined as a volume-weighted average of trades on the expiration day. MYSEA and Donato A. Montanaro submitted a patent application for exchange-listed binary options using a volume-weighted settlement index in 2005. CBOE offers binary options on the S&P 500 (SPX) and the CBOE Volatility Index (VIX). The tickers for these are BSZ and BVZ, respectively.

NADEX, a U.S.-based Commodity Futures Trading Commission (CFTC) regulated exchange, launched binary options for a range of Forex, commodities, and stock indices' markets in June 2009. On March 30, 2010, the CFTC issued an amended Order of Designation to allow trades on NADEX to be intermediated. NADEX have since offered binary options trading between buyers and sellers. They do not participate in the trades.

Fraud

On June 6, 2013, the U.S. CFTC and the SEC jointly issued an Investor Alert to warn about fraudulent promotional schemes involving binary options and binary options trading platforms. The two agencies said that they had received numerous complaints of fraud about binary options trading sites, "including refusal to credit customer accounts or reimburse funds to customers; identity theft; and manipulation of software to generate losing trades". Other binary options operations were violating requirements to register with regulators.

In June 2013, U.S. regulators charged Israeli-Cypriot company Banc De Binary with illegally selling binary options to U.S. investors. In February 2016, the company reached an $11 million settlement with U.S. authorities. Regulators found the company used a "virtual office" in New York's Trump Tower in pursuit of its scheme, evading a ban on off-exchange binary option contracts. The company neither admitted nor denied the allegations. In November 2016, SEC published yet another Investor Alert on binary options websites. In 2016,

In February 2017 The Times of Israel reported that the FBI was conducting an active international investigation of binary option fraud, emphasizing its international nature, saying that the agency was "not limited to the USA". Victims from around the world were asked to contact an FBI field office or the FBI's Internet Crime Complaint Center. The investigation is not limited to the binary options brokers, but is comprehensive and could include companies that provide services that allow the industry to operate. Credit card issuers will be informed of the fraudulent nature of much of the industry, which could possibly allow victims to receive a chargeback, or refund, of fraudulently obtained money.

On March 13, 2017, the FBI reiterated its warning, declaring that the "perpetrators behind many of the binary options websites, primarily criminals located overseas, are only interested in one thing—taking your money". They also provide a checklist on how to avoid being victimized.

There is also a popular binary options recovery services scam, where fraudsters promise to "hunt" down the binary options scammers and retrieve the money from them through legal methods. In January 2018, Boston federal prosecutors filed a complaint against Leonel Alexis Valerio Santana and Frank Gregory Cedeno, accusing them of such type of fraud. In August 2018, Santana was sentenced to 63 months in prison, three years of supervised release, and ordered to pay restitution of $105,869 (Cedeno was indicted in March and pleaded not guilty).

== See also ==
- Option (finance)
- Options strategies
- Options spread
- Options arbitrage
- Synthetic position
- Prediction market
