= Freetrade =

UK-based financial technology company

Freetrade Limited
- Type: Subsidiary
- Industry: FinTech
- Founded: 2016; 10 years ago
- Founders: Adam Dodds; Davide Fioranelli; André Mohamed
- Headquarters: London, United Kingdom
- Key people: Jenny Zhao (CEO)
- Products: Share dealing
- Revenue: ▲£31.0 million (2025)
- Operating income: ▼ -£25.1 million (2025)
- Net income: ▲ -£22.9 million (2023)
- AUM: ▲£3.5 billion (February 2026)
- Total assets: ▼£19.1 million (2023)
- Total equity: ▼£24.0 million (2023)
- Owner: IG Group
- Number of employees: ▲108 (2025)
- Website: freetrade.io

Freetrade is a UK-based fintech company founded in 2016 by Adam Dodds, Davide Fioranelli and André Mohamed. It operates a mobile trading platform for retail investors in the UK, allowing users to trade equities and ETFs through iOS and Android applications.

The company initially used crowdfunding and later raised venture capital, including a $69 million Series B round in 2021, following growth during the COVID-19 pandemic. Losses widened in 2022 and its valuation consequently fell. By the end of 2024, Freetrade reported 720,000 customers with assets under administration of £2.5 billion. After its acquisition by IG Group, assets under administration reached more than £3.5 billion by February 2026.

Freetrade was subject to regulatory action over its advertising practices. In January 2025, IG Group agreed to acquire Freetrade for £160 million. The acquisition was completed on 1 April 2025. The deal prompted criticism from some crowdfunding investors because the sale price was substantially below the company's 2021 peak valuation.

== History ==
Freetrade was founded in 2016 by Adam Dodds, Davide Fioranelli and André Mohamed. In October 2017, the company obtained a licence from the Financial Conduct Authority. It launched an iOS app in October 2018, followed by an Android version in April 2019. A Forbes review described Freetrade's app as "a challenger stock trading app built for the Instagram age," praising its accessibility while criticizing its lack of financial charting tools and the initial absence of US-listed securities.

In 2019, venture capital firm Molten Ventures participated in Freetrade's $15 million Series A funding round.

In 2018, co-founder and CTO André Mohamed departed, while Viktor Nebehaj, an early crowdfunding investor, joined as chief marketing officer. Ian Fuller joined as VP of Engineering from Snapchat in 2018 and left in 2021. In July 2023, Freetrade EU head Jordan Sinclair was hired to lead Robinhood Markets in the UK, joining a rival of Freetrade.

Freetrade grew during the COVID-19 pandemic, and also benefited from the GameStop short squeeze in early 2021.

Freetrade has relied heavily on crowdfunding: between 2017 and 2019, it raised over £10 million from individual investors. A sixth crowdfunding campaign in May 2020 raised an additional £7 million.

The company's $69 million Series B funding round was announced in March 2021, led by Left Lane Capital, with participation from L Catterton and Molten Ventures. Despite quarterly trading volumes exceeding £1 billion in May 2021, 1 million registered users by October, and £1 billion in assets under administration by November, the company reported a net loss of £17.1 million for the year.

In 2022, Freetrade struggled to find new backers at a targeted £700 million valuation amid a broader downturn in tech funding. The company instead raised £30 million from existing investors through a Crowdcube convertible loan note in May 2022 and, in September 2022, cut approximately 15% of its staff to extend its cash runway. Its valuation was later cut by 65% to £225 million in a 2023 crowdfunding round. For its financial year ended 30 September 2022, Freetrade reported a net loss of £39.8 million.

Freetrade initially planned to expand across Europe, beginning with Sweden, Ireland, and the Netherlands. A pan-European launch was scheduled for early 2023, but by 2024 the company had withdrawn from the Swedish market, while the planned launches in Ireland and the Netherlands had not materialised.

In May 2024, CEO and co-founder Adam Dodds announced his resignation, with COO Viktor Nebehaj succeeding him. The previous month, Freetrade reported positive adjusted EBITDA for the first time, at approximately £100,000 for the first quarter of 2024. In October 2024, the company acquired the UK client base and assets of Australia-based online broker Stake for an undisclosed sum. At the end of 2024, Freetrade reported a 32% year-on-year revenue increase, reaching £27.5 million. By the end of 2024, the company had 720,000 customers and assets under administration of £2.5 billion.

In August 2024, Freetrade announced a partnership with Sharegain to launch securities lending to its UK retail clients.

In January 2025, IG Group agreed to acquire Freetrade for £160 million in a cash deal, 29% below its previous fundraising valuation of £225 million. The price was also below the company's peak valuation of around £650 million in late 2021. The acquisition was completed on 1 April 2025 following regulatory approval. At the time, IG said Freetrade would continue to operate as a standalone business under its own brand. About six months before the sale was announced, Freetrade CEO Viktor Nebehaj told Sky News: "Right now, Freetrade is in its strongest financial position in its history." Sky News later reported that Freetrade had held preliminary talks with investment bank JP Morgan about a potential sale in 2022, but no agreement was reached. Some early investors criticised the deal, saying that management had disregarded smaller investors who had supported the company's crowdfunding rounds. Nebehaj acknowledged that Series B investors incurred losses from the sale while, as one user noted, he "coincidentally became a millionaire in the process."

For 2025, Freetrade reported revenue of £31.0 million and a pre-tax loss of £24.4 million, while assets under administration reached £3.3 billion.

In late 2025, Freetrade expanded its product range and revised its pricing. In October 2025, it added mutual funds and introduced retail access to UK government bonds such as gilts and Treasury bills. By March 2026, IG reported that Freetrade offered more than 760 mutual funds across 40 fund managers. In September 2025, the company said its free plan would include a Stocks and Shares ISA at no charge (previously a paid feature). In January 2026, Freetrade removed subscription fees for SIPP accounts and made mutual funds and gilts available on the free tier, shifting paid plans toward optional benefits such as lower foreign exchange fees and higher interest on cash balances.

In February 2026, Freetrade chief executive Viktor Nebehaj announced that he would leave the company in the summer, about a year after the company was acquired by IG Group. He was replaced in June 2026 by Jenny Zhao, who had previously worked at Bulb Energy and Farewill. In July 2026, IG Group announced a new operating model under which its UK & Ireland business, including Freetrade, was brought together with its European and APAC & Middle East businesses in a new IG Consumer division.

== Operations ==
Freetrade offers a trading app for Android and iOS users in the United Kingdom. The platform allows users to trade equities and ETFs listed in the UK and the United States, with support for fractional share trading in US securities. Portfolios can be held in tax-advantaged ISA or SIPP accounts; these account types were initially available only with a paid subscription, but in 2025–26 Freetrade removed the monthly fees, making both ISAs and SIPPs available on the free tier. In October 2020, Freetrade introduced its premium service, Freetrade Plus, which expanded the list of available securities and order types. The platform's backend uses a serverless computing model hosted by Google Cloud Platform.

By late 2025, Freetrade's platform included equities, ETFs and investment trusts, as well as hundreds of mutual funds and UK government bonds such as gilts and Treasury bills. The company primarily earns revenue from foreign exchange fees on non-GBP trades, interest on cash balances, and optional subscription features, rather than per-trade commissions. Although Freetrade does not charge a dealing commission, foreign exchange fees apply to non-GBP trades. In 2025–2026, Freetrade removed subscription fees for ISA and SIPP accounts and made mutual funds and gilts available on its free tier.

== Controversy ==
In January 2020, Freetrade faced allegations over its workplace culture following an investigation by City A.M. into employee complaints. The report said that between 2018 and 2019 the company had a 50% staff turnover rate, with the entire design team resigning at one point. Former employees described pressure to work excessive hours and cited dysfunctional management, abusive communication, and a lack of recognition for good performance.

Freetrade was subject to repeated action by the UK Financial Conduct Authority (FCA) over misleading financial promotions. In March 2020, the regulator identified social-media and website promotions that omitted required risk warnings. The FCA wrote to Freetrade again in March 2021 after identifying further breaches. In December 2021, the FCA issued a First Supervisory Notice ordering Freetrade to remove all paid sponsored influencer advertisements and posts within 24 hours. After considering representations from the company, the FCA issued a Second Supervisory Notice on 8 February 2022, leaving those directions in force. The notice cited TikTok and Instagram promotions by an influencer whose profile focused on paying off debt. The FCA said consumers could be misled into believing that investing through Freetrade would help them clear their debts and found the risk disclosure inadequate.

In 2023, Freetrade faced criticism after HM Revenue and Customs said fractional shares were not qualifying ISA investments, creating uncertainty over the tax treatment of Freetrade customers who held them in ISAs.

== Awards ==
- British Bank Awards 2021 – Best Online Trading Platform
- Good Money Guide 2021 – Best Commission-Free Stockbroker
- British Bank Awards 2020 – Best Online Trading Platform
- British Bank Awards 2019 – Best Share Trading Platform
- Good Money Guide 2019 – People's Choice
