= Cyprus Securities and Exchange Commission =

Financial regulator of Cyprus

- Επιτροπή Κεφαλαιαγοράς

Agency overview
- Formed: 2001
- Jurisdiction: Republic of Cyprus
- Headquarters: Nicosia, Cyprus
- Employees: 198 (2023)
- Agency executive: Dr. George Theocharides, Chairman
- Website: www.cysec.gov.cy

The Cyprus Securities and Exchange Commission (CySEC; Greek: Επιτροπή Κεφαλαιαγοράς) is the financial regulatory agency of Cyprus. As an EU member state, CySEC's financial regulations and operations comply with the European MiFID financial harmonization law.

A significant number of overseas retail forex brokers have obtained registration from CySEC. Before 2018, CySEC had been a regulator of choice for many binary options brokers.

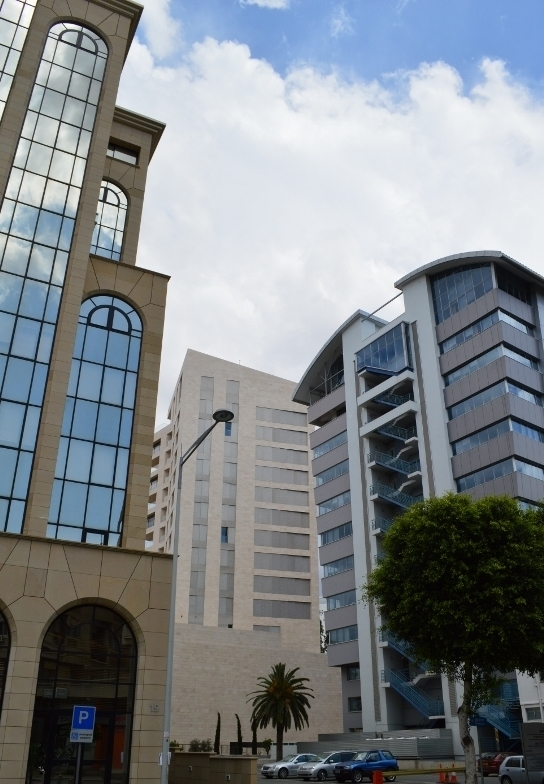
Nicosia financial district

Whereas it is governed under a national framework of accountability, the CySEC increasingly implements policies set at the European Union level. It is a voting member of the Board of Supervisors of the European Securities and Markets Authority (ESMA). It is also a member of the European Systemic Risk Board (ESRB).

== History ==
CySEC was launched in 2001 as part of section 5 of the Cyprus Securities and Exchange Commission (Establishment and Responsibilities) Law of 2001 as a public corporate body. When Cyprus became a member of the European Union in 2004, CySEC simultaneously became a part of the European MiFID regulation, giving firms registered in Cyprus access to all European markets. However, joining the EU and adopting the Euro significantly changed the financial regulatory framework that CySEC policed for what had been previously considered a tax haven.

On May 4, 2012, CySEC announced a policy change regarding the classification of binary options as financial instruments. The effect was that binary options platforms operating in Cyprus (where most of the platforms are based) had to be regulated. This established CySEC as the first financial regulator to globally recognise and regulate binary options as financial instruments.

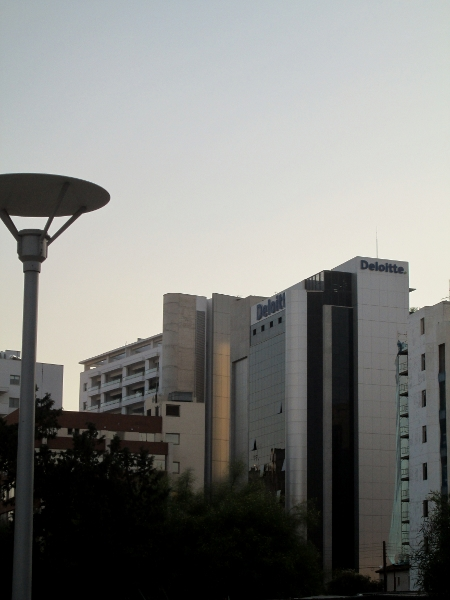
Nicosia financial district

After introducing a temporary ban on binary options in July 2018, CySEC issued a permanent ban on offering binary options trading to retail traders on July 10, 2019.

== Responsibilities ==
CySEC has the following responsibilities:

1. To supervise and control the operation of the Cyprus Stock Exchange and the transactions carried out in the Stock Exchange, its listed companies, brokers and brokerage firms.
2. To supervise and control Licensed Investment Services Companies, Collective Investment funds, investment consultants and mutual fund management companies.
3. To grant operation licences to investment firms, including investment consultants, brokerage firms and brokers.
4. To impose administrative sanctions and disciplinary penalties to brokers, brokerage firms, investment consultants as well as to in any other legal or natural person whom fall under the provisions of the Stock Market legislation.

In a recent amendment to the Law governing CySEC and its responsibility it has received significant power over the entities that it regulates in that it may carry out investigations, enter premises and search as well as to share any findings with foreign regulators.

== Structure ==
CySEC is administered by a seven-member Board which is composed of the Chairman and the Vice-Chairman, who are employed full-time, plus five other non-executive members. The members of the Board are named by the Council of Ministers following a proposal of the Minister of Finance and their service is a five-year term. The service for all the members is renewable for five more years

== Regulation & processing ==
CySEC has experienced very high growth rates of registrations and pioneering legislation in regards to specific financial services. As such, the monitoring and regulation requirements for the organization are continually under adjustment. The process has been under the attention of other EU regulators and CySEC registered Brokerage houses.

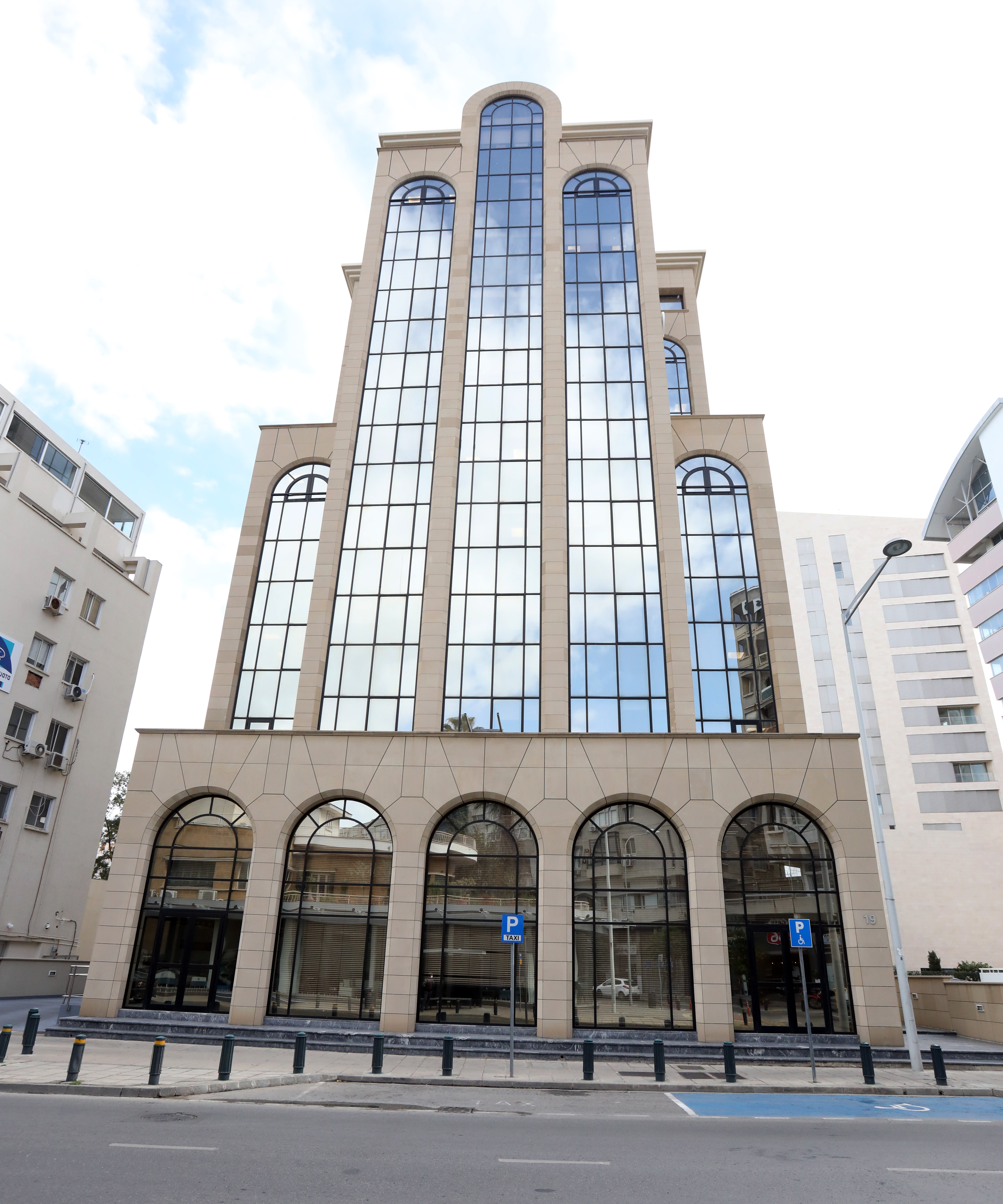
Ajax Building, Nicosia, CySEC Headquarters, 2024

=== Regulation ===
Throughout 2014 and 2015, CySEC has received criticism from traders and industry commentators who claimed that the organization required better legislation regarding the regulation and monitoring of high risk investment firms. They suggested that fines being levied by CySEC tended to be smaller than those handed out by other EU regulatory organizations. Most of the criticism came in regards to specific binary option brokers.

=== Processing ===
CySEC was the first financial regulator aiming to regulate binary options. As such, binary option brokers, including prominent ones, are either registered (or attempting to register) with CySEC to be able to legally operate within the Eurozone or to be trusted internationally. Some of them have been requesting faster processing procedures and processes.

Since July 2018, it no longer allows Cyprus Investment Firms to engage in binary options business with retail customers.

=== Response ===
CySEC has implement sweeping changes to both the registration and regulation processes of all registered entities. Changes include more transparency regarding existing listed entities, tougher fines, Broker suspensions and license revoking. It has also set a strict regulatory approval for name changes. In a circular in 2016, the regulator explains that "the name of the regulated entities, or the use of words within their name, should reflect the work/activities they are engaged in, for purposes of not misleading the investors".

The organization has also set up a new structure in order to improve the handling of investor complaints.

== CIF certification ==
Firms providing investment and other ancillary services employ individuals who hold relevant qualifications. In accordance with state law, an investment firm employee involved in the provision of investment services or the carrying out of investment activities, must be registered in the public register of certified persons after passing the exams. They must also fulfill the requirements of the Guidelines to Investment Firms, which specify the minimum academic and professional qualifications that they should hold. The law aims to arm investment firms with a good understanding of the local and European legal and regulatory framework and practices along with the essential understanding in regards to money laundering, risk management and economics. The following certificates are currently provided by CySEC:

- Basic certificate
- Advanced certificate
- AML compliance officers

== See also ==
- Securities Commission
- European Securities and Markets Authority
- Markets in Financial Instruments Directive
- Binary option
- Retail foreign exchange trading
- List of financial supervisory authorities by country
