= Pattern day trader =

Type of stock trader

In the United States from 2001 to June 2026, a pattern day trader (PDT) was a Financial Industry Regulatory Authority (FINRA) designation for a stock trader who executed four or more day trades in five business days in a margin account, provided the number of day trades was more than six percent of the customer's total trading activity for that same five-day period.

The FINRA rule applied to any customer who bought and sold a particular security in the same trading day (day trades), and did this four or more times in any five consecutive business-day period. The rule applied to margin accounts, but not to cash accounts. A pattern day trader was subject to special rules. The main rule was that in order to engage in pattern day trading in a margin account, the trader was required to maintain an equity balance of at least $25,000. The required minimum equity must have been in the account prior to any day trading activities. Ninety days had to pass without a day trade for a person so classified to lose the restrictions imposed on them. Pursuant to NYSE 432, brokerage firms were required to maintain a daily record of required margin.

The minimum equity requirement in FINRA Rule 4210 was approved by the Securities and Exchange Commission (SEC) on February 27, 2001 by approving amendments to NASD Rule 2520.

In January 2026, FINRA proposed scrapping the rule and replacing it with new intraday margin standards. In April, the SEC approved the proposal, effective June 4, 2026. Brokers that need more time to implement the rule change may phase in their implementation over 18 months, until October 20, 2027.

== Former rule ==
=== Definition ===
A pattern day trader is generally defined in FINRA Rule 4210 (Margin Requirements) as any customer who executes four or more round-trip day trades within any five successive business days. FINRA Rule 4210 is substantially similar to New York Stock Exchange Rule 431. If, however, the number of day trades is less than or equal to 6% of the total number of trades that trader has made for that five business day period, the trader will not be considered a pattern day trader and will not be required to meet the criteria for a pattern day trader.

A non-pattern day trader (i.e. someone with only occasional day trades), can become designated a pattern day trader anytime if they meet the above criteria. If the brokerage firm knows, or reasonably believes a client who seeks to open or resume trading in an account will engage in pattern day trading, then the customer may immediately be deemed to be a pattern day trader without waiting five business days.

=== Requirements and restrictions ===
Under the rules of NYSE and Financial Industry Regulatory Authority, a trader who is deemed to be exhibiting a pattern of day trading is subject to the "Pattern Day Trader" rules and restrictions and is treated differently than a trader that holds positions overnight. In order to day trade:

- Day trading minimum equity: the account must maintain at least USD $25,000 worth of equity.
- Margin call to meet minimum equity: A day trading minimum equity call is issued when the pattern day trader account falls below $25,000. This minimum must be restored by means of cash deposit or other marginable equities.
  - Deadline to meet calls: Pattern day traders are allowed to deposit funds within five business days to meet the margin call
  - Non-withdrawal deposit requirement: This minimum equity or deposits of funds must remain in the account and cannot be withdrawn for at least two business days.
  - Cross guarantees are prohibited: Pattern day traders are prohibited from utilizing cross guarantees to meet day-trading margin calls or to meet minimum equity requirements. Each day trading account is required to meet all margin requirements independently, using only the funds available in the account.
- Restrictions on accounts with unmet day trading calls: if the day trading call is not met, the account's day trading buying power will be restricted for 90 days or until day trading minimum equity (i.e. the margin call is met).

=== Day trading in cash accounts ===
The Pattern Day Trading rule regulates the use of margin and is defined only for margin accounts. Cash accounts, by definition, do not borrow on margin, so day trading is subject to separate rules regarding Cash Accounts. Cash account holders may still engage in certain day trades, as long as the activity does not result in free riding, which is the sale of securities bought with unsettled funds. An instance of free-riding will cause a cash account to be restricted for 90 days to purchasing securities with cash up front. Under Regulation T, brokers must freeze an investor's account for 90 days if the investor sells securities that have not been fully paid (i.e. paid for with unavailable funds). During this 90-day period, the investor must fully pay for any purchase on the date of the trade.
