= Day trading =

Buying and selling financial instruments within the same trading day

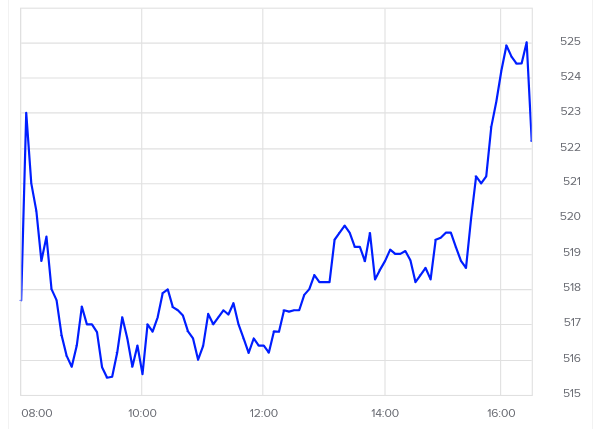
A stock's price changes over the course of a trading day

Day trading is a share trading strategy in which a trader buys and sells the same financial instrument or security on the same trading day. As can be seen on the chart on the right, the price of stock can vary somewhat in the course of the day, and the point at which the buy and sell transactions take place will determine whether the trader makes a profit or loss, taking into account any fees on the transactions. The day trader will normally close all positions (i.e. sells all the securities) before the market closes on the trading day to avoid unmanageable risks and negative price gaps between one day's close and the next day's price at the open. Day traders are generally classified as speculators. Day trading contrasts with the long-term trades underlying buy-and-hold and value investing strategies. Day trading may require fast trade execution, sometimes as fast as milliseconds in scalping; therefore direct-access day trading software is often needed.

According to FINRA, a "day trade" involves the purchase and sale (or sale and purchase) of the same security on the same day in a margin account, covering a range of securities including options. An individual is considered a "pattern day trader" if they execute four or more day trades within five business days, given these trades make up over six percent of their total trades in the margin account during that period. Pattern day traders must adhere to specific margin requirements, notably maintaining a minimum equity of $2,000 in their trading account before engaging in day trading activities.

Day traders generally use leverage such as margin loans. In the United States, Regulation T permits an initial maximum leverage of 2:1, but many brokers will permit 4:1 intraday leverage as long as the leverage is reduced to 2:1 or less by the end of the trading day. In other countries margin rates of 30:1 or higher are available. In the United States, based on rules by the Financial Industry Regulatory Authority, people who make more than three day trades per one five-trading-day period are termed pattern day traders and are required to maintain $25,000 in equity in their accounts. However, a day trader with the legal minimum of $2,000 in their account can buy $8,000 (broker dependent leverage) worth of stock during the day, as long as half of those positions are exited before the market close. Because of the high risk of margin use, and of other day trading practices, a day trader will often have to exit a losing position very quickly, in order to prevent a greater, unacceptable loss, or even a disastrous loss, much larger than their original investment, or even larger than their account value.

Day trading was once an activity that was exclusive to financial firms and professional speculators. Many day traders are bank or investment firm employees working as specialists in equity investment and investment management. Day trading gained popularity after the deregulation of commissions in the United States in 1975, the advent of electronic trading platforms in the 1990s, and with the stock price volatility during the dot-com bubble. Recent 2020 pandemic lockdowns and following market volatility has caused a significant number of retail traders to enter the market.

Day traders may be professionals that work for large financial institutions, are trained by other professionals or mentors, do not use their own capital, or receive a base salary of approximately $50,000 to $70,000 as well as the possibility for bonuses of 10%–30% of the profits realized. Individuals can day trade with as little as $100.

Numerous studies suggest that nearly all day traders lose money. In the absence of inside information, it is almost impossible to achieve returns exceeding transactions costs.

== History ==
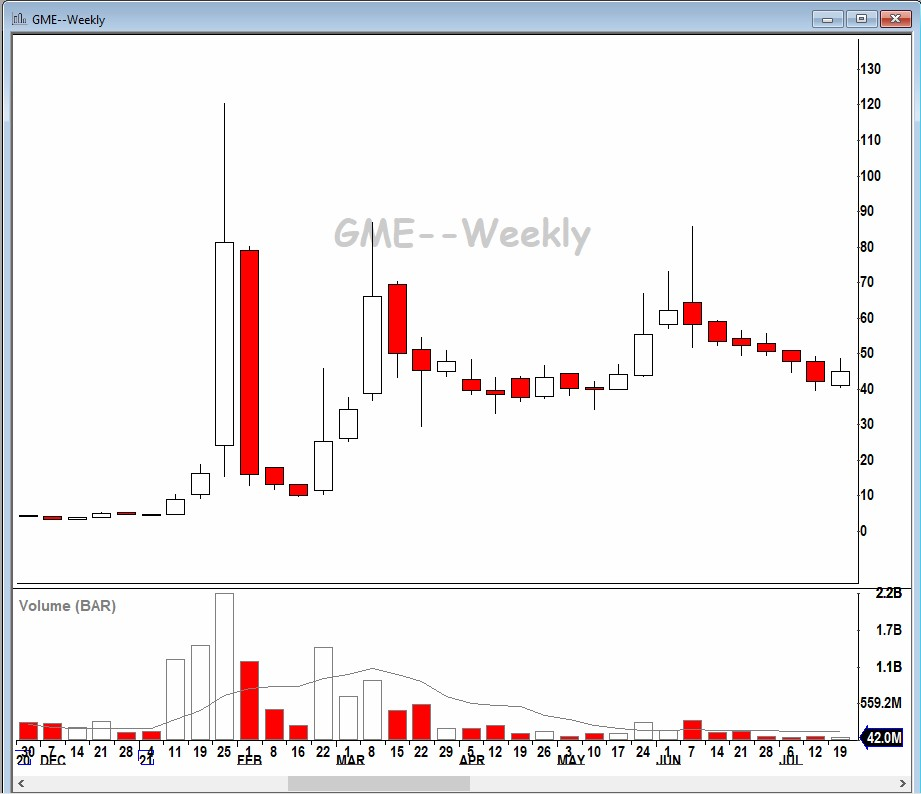
GME short squeeze weekly chart in 2021 where price squeezed over 1,000% in 2021 providing numerous day trading opportunities

Electronic communication networks (ECNs), large proprietary computer networks on which brokers can list a certain number of securities to sell at a certain price (the asking price or "ask") or offer to buy a certain number of securities at a certain price (the "bid"), first became a factor with the launch of Instinet in 1969. However, at first, they generally offered better pricing to large traders.

The establishment of NASDAQ in 1971 introduced an electronic quotation system that allowed market makers to update bid and ask prices electronically, improving the dissemination of market information.

After Black Monday (1987), the SEC adopted "Order Handling Rules" which required market makers to publish their best bid and ask on the NASDAQ.

In the 1980s, the NASDAQ introduced the Small Order Execution System (SOES). The SOES became so popular among day traders that they were known as "SOES bandits". The SOES system ultimately led to trading facilitated by software instead of market makers via ECNs.

The ability for individuals to day trade via electronic trading platforms coincided with the extreme bull market in technological issues from 1997 to early 2000, known as the dot-com bubble. From 1997 to 2000, the NASDAQ rose from 1,200 to 5,000. Many naive investors with little market experience made huge profits buying these stocks in the morning and selling them in the afternoon, at 400% margin rates. An unprecedented level of personal investing occurred during the boom and stories of people quitting their jobs to day trade were common.

In March 2000, this bubble burst, and many less-experienced day traders began to lose money as fast, or faster, than they had made during the buying frenzy. The NASDAQ crashed from 5000 back to 1200; many of the less-experienced traders went broke, although obviously it was possible to have made a fortune during that time by short selling or playing on volatility.

== Profitability and risks ==
Because of the nature of financial leverage and the rapid returns that are possible, day trading results can range from extremely profitable to extremely unprofitable; high-risk profile traders can generate either huge percentage returns or huge percentage losses.

Day trading is risky, and the U.S. Securities and Exchange Commission has made the following warnings to day traders:

- Be prepared to suffer severe financial losses
- Day traders do not "invest"
- Day trading is an extremely stressful and expensive full-time job
- Day traders depend heavily on borrowing money or buying stocks on margin
- Don't believe claims of easy profits
- Watch out for "hot tips" and "expert advice" from newsletters and websites catering to day traders
- Remember that "educational" seminars, classes, and books about day trading may not be objective
- Check out day trading firms with your state securities regulator

Most day traders lose money.

A 2017 article in Forbes quoting someone from an educational trading website stated that "the success rate for day traders is estimated to be around only 10%, so ... 90% are losing money," adding "only 1% of [day] traders really make money."

A 2019 research paper analyzed the performance of individual day traders in the Brazilian equity futures market. Based on trading records from 2012 to 2017, it was concluded that day trading Brazilian equity futures is almost uniformly unprofitable:

Considering the performance net of exchange and brokerage fees, we find that 97% of all investors who persisted for more than 300 days lost money. Only 17 individuals (1.1% of 1,551) earned more than the Brazilian minimum wage (US$16 per day), only eight individuals (0.5% of 1,551) earned more than the initial salary of a bank teller (US$54 per day), and the individual who earned the most earned US$310 per day on average. Importantly, the eight individuals who earned more than the initial salary of a bank teller did so with great volatility: the standard deviation of the daily profit of these eight individuals ranges from US$632 to US$3,308.

== Techniques ==
Day trading requires a sound and rehearsed method to provide a statistical edge on each trade and should not be engaged on a whim.

The following are several basic trading strategies by which day traders attempt to make profits. In addition, some day traders also use contrarian investing strategies (more commonly seen in algorithmic trading) to trade specifically against irrational behavior from day traders using the approaches below. It is important for a trader to remain flexible and adjust techniques to match changing market conditions.

=== Swing trading ===
Swing trading is a trading strategy that involves holding a financial instrument for one or more days in an attempt to profit from price changes, or "swings". While day trading focuses on intraday volatility and requires all positions to be closed before the market session ends, swing traders hold positions for several days to weeks. This approach typically utilizes technical analysis to identify trends and patterns, but may also incorporate fundamental analysis to gauge a security's value. Compared with day trading, swing trading generally involves a lower frequency of trades, which may reduce transaction costs, but it also carries overnight risk, including the possibility of significant price gaps occurring while markets are closed.

=== Trend following ===
Trend following, or momentum trading, is a strategy used in all trading time-frames, assumes that financial instruments which have been rising steadily will continue to rise, and vice versa with falling. Traders can profit by buying an instrument which has been rising, or short selling a falling one, in the expectation that the trend will continue. These traders use technical analysis to identify trends.

Szakmary and Lancaster (2015) validate the effectiveness of trend following in the U.S. stock market, demonstrating its potential for generating positive returns. Similarly, research by Blackstar Funds highlights rigorous applications of trend following in commodities, financial futures, and currencies, although its application to stock trading presented challenges.

=== Contrarian investing ===
Contrarian investing is a market timing strategy used in all trading time-frames. It assumes that financial instruments that have been rising steadily will reverse and start to fall, and vice versa. The contrarian trader buys an instrument which has been falling, or short-sells a rising one, in the expectation that the trend will change.

=== Range trading ===
Range trading, or range-bound trading, is a trading style in which stocks are watched that have either been rising off a support price or falling off a resistance price. That is, every time the stock hits a high, it falls back to the low, and vice versa. Such a stock is said to be "trading in a range", which is the opposite of trending.

=== Scalping ===
Scalping was originally referred to as spread trading. Scalping is a trading style where small price gaps created by the bid–ask spread are exploited by the speculator. It normally involves establishing and liquidating a position quickly, usually within minutes or even seconds.

Scalping highly liquid instruments for off-the-floor day traders involves taking quick profits while minimizing risk (loss exposure). It applies technical analysis concepts such as over/under-bought, support and resistance zones as well as trendline, trading channel to enter the market at key points and take quick profits from small moves. The basic idea of scalping is to exploit the inefficiency of the market when volatility increases and the trading range expands. Scalpers also use the 'fade' technique, when stock values suddenly rise, they short sell securities that seem overvalued.

=== Rebate trading ===
Rebate trading is an equity trading style that uses ECN rebates as a primary source of profit and revenue. Most ECNs charge commissions to customers who want to have their orders filled immediately at the best prices available, but the ECNs pay commissions to buyers or sellers who "add liquidity" by placing limit orders that create "market-making" in a security. Rebate traders seek to make money from these rebates and will usually maximize their returns by trading low priced, high volume stocks. This enables them to trade more shares and contribute more liquidity with a set amount of capital, while limiting the risk that they will not be able to exit a position in the stock.

=== Trading the news ===
Trading the news is a technique for trading equities, currencies, and other financial instruments in the financial markets based on news sources.

=== Market-neutral trading ===
Market-neutral trading is a strategy that is designed to mitigate risk in which a trader takes a long position in one security and a short position in another security that is related.

=== Algorithmic trading ===
It is estimated that more than 75% of stock trades in United States are generated by algorithmic trading or high-frequency trading. The increased use of algorithms and quantitative techniques has led to more competition and smaller profits.

=== Opening Range Breakout (ORB) ===
The Opening Range Breakout is often credited as being initially introduced by Toby Crabel with his 1990 book Day Trading with Short Term Price Patterns and Opening Range Breakout. Crabel describes the ORB as "a trade taken at a predetermined amount (the stretch) above or below the opening range". The strategy involves determining the stretch, which is done by looking at the volatility of the previous ten days, and then placing a buy stop at this amount above the high of the opening range and a sell stop the same amount below the low of said opening range. Whichever stop triggers first serves as the position and the other stop then serves as a protective stop.

== Cost ==
=== Commission ===
Intraday trades may involve heavy commissions by brokers; these may be a fixed fee per trade or a percentage of the sum involved.

=== Spread ===
The numerical difference between the bid and ask prices is referred to as the bid–ask spread. It can be viewed as an estimate of transaction costs.

The bid–ask spread is two sides of the same coin. The spread can be viewed as trading bonuses or costs according to different parties and different strategies. On one hand, traders who do NOT wish to queue their order, instead paying the market price, pay the spreads (costs). On the other hand, traders who wish to queue and wait for execution receive the spreads (bonuses). Some day trading strategies attempt to capture the spread as additional, or even the only, profits for successful trades.

=== Market data ===
Market data is necessary for day traders to be competitive. A real-time data feed requires paying fees to the respective stock exchanges, usually combined with the broker's charges; these fees are usually very low compared to the other costs of trading. The fees may be waived for promotional purposes or for customers meeting a minimum monthly volume of trades. Even a moderately active day trader can expect to meet these requirements, making the basic data feed essentially "free". In addition to the raw market data, some traders purchase more advanced data feeds that include historical data and features such as scanning large numbers of stocks in the live market for unusual activity. Complicated analysis and charting software are other popular additions. These types of systems can cost from tens to hundreds of dollars per month to access.

=== Taxes ===
Several jurisdictions actively try to discourage day trading by imposing a financial transaction tax, particularly for segments which are considered too risky, such futures, options. and forex trade.

== See also ==
- Everything bubble
- GameStop short squeeze
- Price action trading
- Pump and dump
