= Prime brokerage =

Package of services offered by investment banks

Prime brokerage is the generic term for a bundled package of services offered by large financial institutions (including investment banks and broker-dealers) to hedge funds, commonly including financing and securities lending to facilitate leveraged trading strategies. Prime brokers also typically provide centralized clearing and settlement and consolidated reporting for client positions.

Prime brokers earn revenue primarily through spreads on financing and securities lending and may also earn fees for clearing and other services. In some jurisdictions and structures, prime brokers may have rights of rehypothecation over client collateral, which can support the economics of financing and securities-lending activities.

== Services ==
Each client in the market of a prime broker will have certain technological needs related to the management of its portfolio. These can be as simple as daily statements or as complicated as real-time portfolio reporting, and the client must work closely with the prime broker to ensure that its needs are met. Certain prime brokers offer more specialized services to certain clients.

For example, a prime broker may also be in the business of leasing office space to hedge funds, as well as including on-site services as part of the arrangement. Risk management and consulting services may be among these, especially if the hedge fund has just started operations.

The following services are typically bundled into the prime brokerage package:

- Global custody (including clearing, custody, and asset servicing)
- Securities lending
- Financing (to facilitate leverage of client assets)
- Customized technology (provide hedge fund managers with portfolio reporting needed to effectively manage money)
- Operational support (prime brokers act as a hedge fund's primary operations contact with all other broker dealers)

In addition, certain prime brokers provide additional "value-added" services, which may include some or all of the following:

- Capital Introduction – A process whereby the prime broker attempts to introduce its hedge fund clients to qualified hedge fund investors who have an interest in exploring new opportunities to make hedge fund investments.
- Office Space Leasing and Servicing – Certain prime brokers lease commercial real estate, and then sublease blocks of space to hedge fund tenants. These prime brokers typically provide a suite of on-site services for clients who utilize their space. This is typically called a "hedge fund hotel".
- Risk Management Advisory Services – The provision of risk analytic technology, sometimes supplemented by consulting by senior risk professionals.
- Consulting Services – A range of consulting / advisory services, typically provided to "start-up" hedge funds, and focused on issues associated with regulatory establishment requirements in the jurisdiction where the hedge fund manager will be resident, as well as in the jurisdiction(s) where the fund itself will be domiciled.

== History ==
The basic services offered by a prime broker give a money manager the ability to trade with multiple brokerage houses while maintaining, in a centralized master account at their prime broker, all of the hedge fund's cash and securities. Additionally, the prime broker offers stock loan services, portfolio reporting, consolidated cash management and other services. Fundamentally, the advent of the prime broker freed the money manager from the more time consuming and expensive aspects of running a fund. These services worked because they also allowed the money manager to maintain relationships with multiple brokerage houses for IPO allocations, research, best execution, conference access and other products.

The concept and term "prime brokerage" is generally attributed to the U.S. broker-dealer Furman Selz in the late 1970s. However, the first hedge fund operation is attributed to Alfred Winslow Jones in 1949. In the pre-prime brokerage marketplace, portfolio management was a significant challenge; money managers had to keep track of all of their own trades, consolidate their positions and calculate their performance regardless of which brokerage firms executed those trades or maintained those positions. The concept was immediately seen to be successful, and was quickly copied by the dominant bulge bracket brokerage firms such as Morgan Stanley, Bear Stearns, Merrill Lynch, Credit Suisse, Citigroup, and Goldman Sachs. At this nascent stage, hedge funds were much smaller than they are today and were mostly U.S. domestic long/short equity funds. The first non-U.S. prime brokerage business was created by Merrill Lynch's London office in the late 1980s. After the 2008 financial crisis, new entrants came to the market with custody-based prime brokerage offerings.

=== 1980s to 2000s ===
Through the 1980s and 1990s, prime brokerage was largely an equities-based product, although various prime brokers did supplement their core equities capabilities with basic bond clearing and custody. In addition, prime brokers supplemented their operational function by providing portfolio reporting; initially by messenger, then by fax and today over the web. Over the years, prime brokers have expanded their product and service offerings to include some or all of the full range of fixed income and derivative products, as well as foreign exchange and futures products.

As hedge funds proliferated globally through the 1990s and the 2000s, prime brokerage became an increasingly competitive field and an important contributor to the overall profitability of the investment banking business. As of 2006, the most successful investment banks each report over US$2 billion in annual revenue directly attributed to their prime brokerage operations (source: 2006 annual reports of Morgan Stanley and Goldman Sachs).

=== 2008 financial crisis ===
The 2008 financial crisis led to numerous brokers and banks restructuring, and customers, worried about their credit risk to their prime brokers, sought to diversify their counter-party exposure away from many of their historic sole or dual prime broker relationships.

Restructuring transactions in 2008 included the absorption of Bear Stearns into JP Morgan, the acquisition of the assets of Lehman Brothers in the US by Barclays, the acquisition of Merrill Lynch by Bank of America, and the acquisition of certain Lehman Brothers assets in Europe and Asia by Nomura. Counter-party diversification saw the largest flows of client assets out of Morgan Stanley and Goldman Sachs (the two firms who had historically had the largest share of the business, and therefore had the most exposure to the diversification process), and into firms which were perceived, at the time, to be the most creditworthy. The banks which captured these flows to the greatest degree were Credit Suisse, JP Morgan, and Deutsche Bank. During these market changes, HSBC launched a prime brokerage business in 2009 called "HSBC Prime Services", which built its prime brokerage platform out of its custody business.

== Counterparty risks ==
The prime brokerage landscape has dramatically changed since the collapse of Lehman Brothers in September 2008. Hedge funds who received margin financing from Lehman Brothers could not withdraw their collateral when Lehman filed for Chapter 11 bankruptcy protection due to a lack of asset protection rules (such as 15c3 in the United States) in the United Kingdom. This was one of many factors that led to the massive deleveraging of capital markets during the 2008 financial crisis.

Upon Lehman's collapse, investors realized that no prime broker was too big to fail and spread their counterparty risk across several prime brokerages, especially those with strong capital reserves. This trend towards multi-prime brokerage is also not without its problems. From an operational standpoint, it is adding some complexity and hedge funds have to invest in technologies and extra resources to manage the different relationships. Also, from the investors' point of view, the multi-prime brokerage is adding some complexity to the due diligence as it becomes very complicated to perform proper assets reconciliation between the fund's administrator and its counterparties.

== Fees ==
Prime brokers do not charge a fee for the bundled package of services they provide to hedge funds. Rather, revenues are typically derived from three sources: spreads on financing (including stock loan), trading commissions and fees for the settlement of transactions done away from the prime broker. The financing and lending spreads, which are charged in basis points on the value of client loans (debit balances), client deposits (credit balances), client short sales (short balances), and synthetic financing products such as swaps and contracts for difference (CFDs), make up the vast majority of prime brokerage revenue.

Therefore, clients who frequently sell short or obtain leverage by entering into margin loans or unfunded derivatives represent more lucrative opportunity than clients who do not borrow. Clients whose market activities are principally fixed income-oriented will generally produce less prime brokerage revenue, but may still present significant economic opportunity in the repo, foreign exchange (FX), futures, and flow business areas of the investment bank.

== Risks ==
Prime brokers facilitate hedge fund leverage, primarily through loans secured by the long positions of their clients. In this regard, the prime broker is exposed to the risk of loss in the event that the value of collateral held as security declines below the loan value, and the client is unable to repay the deficit. Other forms of risk inherent in prime brokerage include operational risk and reputational risk.

Large prime brokerage firms today typically monitor the risk within client portfolios through house-designed "risk based" margin methodologies that consider the worst case loss of a portfolio based on liquidity, concentration, ownership, macroeconomic, investing strategies, and other risks of the portfolio. These risk scenarios usually involve a defined set of stress test scenarios, rules allowing risk offsets between the theoretical profit and losses (P&Ls) of these stress test scenarios for products of a common underlier, and offsets between groups of theoretical P&Ls based on correlations.

Liquidity penalties may be established using a rule-of-thumb for days-to-liquidate that 10% of the daily trading volume can be liquidated without overdue influence on the price. Therefore, a position 1x the daily trading volume would be assumed to take 10 business days to liquidate.

Stress testing entails running a series of what-if scenarios that identify the theoretical profits or losses for each position due to adverse market events.

Examples of stress test scenarios include:

- Flight to quality
- 3%–15% up or down price movements used in portfolio margin

== Margin methodologies ==
- House Methodologies
  - Rules-Based
  - Stress Tests
  - Risk Based Haircuts (RBH)
- Self-regulatory Organizations
  - Portfolio margin
- US Regulatory
  - Regulation T
  - Special memorandum account
  - Arranged Financing

== See also ==
- Securities market participants (United States)
