= 24X National Exchange =

Proposed American stock exchange

24 Exchange is a proposed American stock exchange planned to launch in 2025 that will offer trading for more hours than a typical stock market trading day. It has been proposed to trade from 4:00 am Eastern Time (ET) to 7:00 pm ET on weekdays. It is based in Stamford, Connecticut. It received preliminary approval by the Securities and Exchange Commission in November 2024. It is backed by Steve Cohen.

== See also ==
- Extended-hours trading
- List of stock exchange opening times
- Trading curb
- Trading day
