= George Santos =

American politician and convicted fraudster (born 1988)

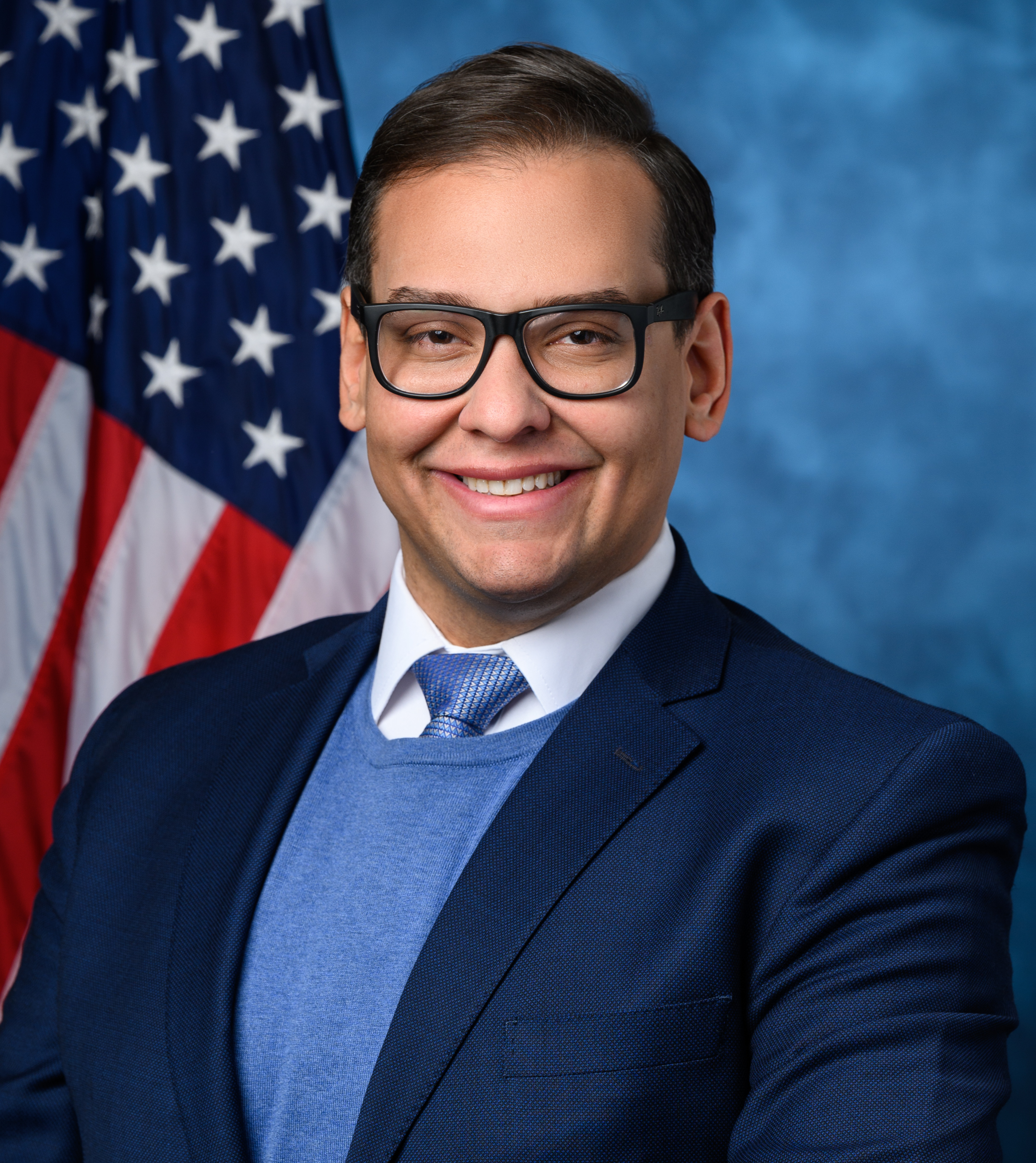
- Official portrait, 2022

Member of the U.S. House of Representatives from New York's 3rd district
- In office January 3, 2023 – December 1, 2023
- Preceded by: Tom Suozzi
- Succeeded by: Tom Suozzi

Personal details
- Born: George Anthony Devolder Santos; July 22, 1988 (age 38)
- Party: Independent (2024–present)
- Other political affiliations: Republican (2019–2024)
- Website: House website (archived)
- Criminal information
- Status: Released
- Convictions: Brazil: felony check fraud United States: wire fraud and aggravated identity theft
- Penalty: Brazil: R$24,000 fine United States: 87 months in prison (commuted)
- Santos's voice Santos introducing the SALT Relief Act; Recorded February 28, 2023

George Anthony Devolder Santos (born July 22, 1988) is an American former politician and convicted fraudster who served as the U.S. representative for New York's 3rd congressional district from January to December 2023, when he was expelled from Congress. He was elected in 2022 as a Republican, defeating Democrat Robert Zimmerman in the election for New York's 3rd district. He had previously run for the same seat, unsuccessfully challenging incumbent Tom Suozzi. Santos is the first openly LGBTQ Republican elected to Congress as a freshman.

Within weeks of Santos's election, before he was sworn in, reporting revealed much of his biography was fabricated. He admitted lying about his education and employment, and disclosures related to his business activity and financials were self-contradictory, incomplete, or unverifiable. Santos had also not disclosed his criminal history and pending lawsuits. He was sworn in as a member of the House in January 2023, but faced ongoing media scrutiny as well as demands for his resignation from members of both parties.

Following an investigation by the House Ethics Committee and a federal indictment, the House of Representatives voted 311–114 to expel Santos on December 1, 2023. Santos was the first member of Congress to be expelled without having previously been convicted of a crime or having supported the Confederacy. He was the sixth member expelled overall, and the first Republican. In August 2024, Santos pled guilty to identity theft and wire fraud. In April 2025, he was sentenced to 87 months in prison, which he began serving that July. Six months later, President Donald Trump commuted Santos's sentence.

In 2026, Santos stoked speculation that he might attend that year's State of the Union speech, while also betting on Kalshi, an online prediction market, that he would not attend. After he did not attend the speech and made a reported $17,000 on Kalshi, he was investigated and fined by the United States Commodities Futures Trading Commission for manipulating the market, and became the first person to be fined and banned for life by Kalshi.

== Background and education ==
George Anthony Devolder Santos (Note: While Santos has used various aliases, he was charged in the United States District Court for the Eastern District of New York under the name "George Anthony Devolder Santos". He told Piers Morgan that his parents could not agree on his first name, so they gave him both. His mother preferred Anthony, and always used it. He used different name combinations at different times, settling on George Santos shortly before his first run for Congress at the suggestion of a local Republican activist, who liked the sound of it.) was born on July 22, 1988, (Note: Santos later claimed, in support of his opposition to abortion, that his birth was premature, at 24 weeks of gestation. It could not be determined if this was true.) to Fátima Alzira Caruso Horta Devolder and Gercino Antônio dos Santos Jr. (known as Junior), both of whom were born in Brazil.

His maternal grandparents, Paulo Horta Devolder and Rosalina Caruso Horta Devolder, were also born in Brazil. Three of his four maternal great-grandparents were also born in Brazil, with the other born in Belgium. His mother, Fátima Devolder, immigrated to Florida in 1985, working in agriculture. She later moved to New York City, working as a housekeeper, cook, and nanny. (Note: Fatima reportedly left one of the latter positions, in the home of Charles Goodman, son of Marvel Comics founder Martin, abruptly after questions were raised about missing items.) Gercino Santos was a house painter. Santos has claimed dual citizenship in the U.S. and Brazil. (Note: His mother's U.S. immigration records do not indicate that she ever became naturalized.) In 2013, a Brazilian court described him as American.

Santos has said his family was poor during his childhood, living in a rat-infested basement apartment in Jackson Heights, Queens, near a Brazilian immigrant enclave in Astoria. Relatives and friends recall that his parents and an aunt often bought him dolls, toys and clothes despite their money problems. His parents' marriage appears to have ended by 1998, when records in Gercino's native state of Minas Gerais show that he remarried there. Santos remained close to his mother (living with her intermittently until her death) and maintained infrequent contact with his father. According to a biographer, Santos developed a reputation within his family for deceit and theft during his childhood. (Note: "It's always a pebble of truth and a mountain of lies" with him, one relative said.; Fátima responded with "Oh God, Anthony and his stories" when asked to confirm one of them by a former roommate of Santos, after which she advised her interlocutor not to believe George's accounts of his past.; He reportedly kept money his aunt gave him to pay some of her bills; she did not find out until she received notice that they were overdue (She has never spoken on the record about her nephew).; On two separate occasions, including one where he stopped someone from taking a bag of his own important papers at George's behest, Gercino advised people to be careful regarding their dealings with him.)

Santos holds a GED (Certificate of High School Equivalency). He attended Primary School 122 (also known as P.S.122 The Mamie Fay School) in Astoria and Intermediate School 125 (also known as I.S. 125 Thomas J. McCann Woodside Intermediate School) in Woodside, Queens.

=== In Brazil ===
Around 2008, George moved to Niterói in Brazil's Rio de Janeiro Metropolitan Area, where his mother, Fátima, was then living, and lived there until 2011, although acquaintances of Santos from that period are unsure whether he lived in Brazil or merely visited. Many knew him as Anthony Devolder. Fátima lived in difficult circumstances, working odd jobs, moving around frequently due to unpaid rent, and obtaining electricity illegally. Santos told people his family had money because his father was a high-paid executive in New York.

A friend from that time says Santos was very involved in local LGBT activism, handing out leaflets and regularly attending meetings of a local activist group and Pride parades. (Note: "Shy and effeminate" as a child, a relative says, Santos was bullied by cousins; his family was not comfortable with his sexuality) Two former acquaintances said that he competed as a drag queen in Brazilian beauty pageants in 2008 using the drag name Kitara Ravache, (Note: Brazilian Portuguese: [kiˈtaɾɐ ʁɐˈvaʃi]) with one saying that Santos began dressing in drag in 2005. Manoel Antiqueira, who performs in drag as Eula Rochard, recalls Santos returning from a 2007 trip to the U.S. with expensive materials for a dress that were not available in Brazil at the time. (Note: Other evidence of Santos performing as a drag queen in Brazil includes: A journalist, João Fragah, has said he interviewed Santos on video performing as Kitara Ravache.; The Brazilian news program Fantástico published a video purportedly of Santos dancing in drag at Niterói's 2007 gay parade; Fantástico cited digital crimes expert Wanderson Castilho confirming that this person was Santos.; A Wikipedia user called "Anthonydevolder" (one of Santos's aliases) wrote about himself on the site in 2011, giving Santos's birth date, describing a similar family background, stating that at 17, he had been a drag queen in a gay nightclub and had won several gay beauty pageants, and identifying three supposed television and movie acting credits.) Santos denied having been a drag queen, calling the allegations "categorically false" and accusing the media of making "outrageous claims about my life"; two days later, he said, "No, I was not a drag queen in Brazil, guys. I was young and I had fun at a festival."

While in Brazil, Santos's politics were shaped by his family's support for right-wing politician Jair Bolsonaro, who later became Brazil's president. Santos supported Bolsonaro despite his open homophobia. The Santoses frequently disparaged Brazil's then-president, Luiz Inácio Lula da Silva, on social media. After winning his House election, Santos posted a picture of himself with Bolsonaro's conservative ally Carla Zambelli.

== Early career and entering politics ==
From October 2011 to July 2012, Santos worked as a customer service representative at a call center for Dish Network in College Point, Queens. Hired for his second-language skills, he handled calls from Portuguese-speaking customers.

The New York Times verified that sometime after 2013, Santos worked for HotelsPro, a subsidiary of Turkey-headquartered MetGlobal.

=== Devolder Organization ===
Around the time he is reported to have left Harbor City Capital, Santos founded a limited liability company (LLC) called the Devolder Organization, and his reported personal income rose substantially. (Note: According to Mother Jones, Santos's reported personal income increased from $55,000 in 2020 to between $3.5 million and $11.5 million in 2022 and 2023.) The company had no public presence when major media investigations commenced, and Santos has given inconsistent explanations of its business.

According to his financial disclosures, Santos was the sole owner and managing member, (Note: A person or entity with an ownership interest in a limited liability company is called a member.) managing $80 million in assets. On financial disclosure forms, Santos called the organization a "capital introduction consulting" firm. Although based in New York, the company was registered in Florida, where it was dissolved in September 2022 for failing to file annual reports. Santos said that its accountant had missed the annual filing deadline. In 2022, the organization lent Santos's congressional campaign more than $700,000. Santos reported receiving a salary of $750,000 and dividends of $1–$5 million from the company, even though he also claimed that its estimated value was in the same range.

Despite his claims about the organization's size, Santos's financial disclosure forms listed no clients. In July 2022, Dun & Bradstreet estimated Devolder's revenue at less than $50,000. Santos listed himself as the registered agent for the LLC and listed Florida as his state of residence. The company's mailing address was a Merritt Island apartment.

The House Ethics Committee's investigation found that Santos incorporated the LLC in May 2021, although he reported income from it on his 2020 income tax return. The committee found that when Santos applied for a business account, he told the bank that the organization made $800,000 in net profit every year and grossed $1.5 million; his May 2022 campaign financial disclosure said that the company's assets were in the $1–1.5 million range. The organization's 2021 financial statements showed $614 of income and over $14,000 of expenses, amounting to a loss exceeding $13,000, and at the time Santos filed the 2022 disclosure, there was $4 in the company bank account. (Note: The House Ethics Committee noted that Santos's frequent claims of wealth stood in stark contrast to his own financial reality: "[He] was frequently in debt, had an abysmal credit score, and relied on an ever-growing wallet of high-interest credit cards to fund his luxury spending habits.") The committee said that both Santos's personal and business accounts were used for a series of "significant" cash deposits followed by prompt cash withdrawals of similar amounts, and the source of the cash was unclear. The unexplained cash withdrawals amounted to over $240,000.

== United States Representative ==
=== Elections ===
==== 2020 campaign ====
Santos ran as a Republican for the United States House of Representatives in New York's 3rd congressional district, against Democratic incumbent Tom Suozzi, launching his campaign in November 2019. Normally, the Nassau County Republican Committee, known for the tight control that its leadership exercises over often competitive races for its nominations, would have discouraged an unknown candidate with such minimal experience. However, Suozzi was expected to win the race easily, and no other candidates had put their names forward. Santos raised funds, spoke to donor groups, and attended a phone-banking session at Mar-a-Lago with Donald Trump's children; his efforts impressed party officials. He bought entire tables at New York Young Republican events. Other candidates making the same rounds noticed that Santos repeatedly exaggerated his fundraising totals, with a wide contrast between what he said and what he reported in his campaign finance disclosure forms.

Suozzi later recalled that he had no doubt he would defeat Santos, an unknown who was not well-funded and who at the time was registered to vote in an area of Queens that was outside the district. When reporters pressed him about living outside the district, Santos claimed an address that turned out to be his campaign treasurer's. Because Santos was so little-known in the district, the Suozzi campaign decided not to pay for opposition research, deciding that it would be counterproductive to increase his name recognition. As expected, Suozzi prevailed; he defeated Santos 56% to 43% (a margin of 46,624 votes). Despite Santos's loss, local Republicans were pleasantly surprised by his performance.

==== 2022 campaign ====
Shortly after his loss to Suozzi, Santos formed GADS PAC, a leadership PAC, and began raising money to run for Congress again. Then-New York state Republican chair Nick Langworthy noted that "George never stopped being a candidate" and was "spending time at Mar-a-Lago, raising money in different circles". U.S. representative Elise Stefanik endorsed him in August 2021 and helped him raise over $100,000 at a fundraiser.

Some Republicans had reservations about Santos. In mid-2021, one of his former advisors uncovered questionable business practices at Harbor City, but was unable to get press coverage. Late in the year, Santos's campaign commissioned a vulnerability study, which revealed significant issues. Some staff members advised him to drop out; instead, he dismissed the concerns and refused to show his diplomas, leading several staffers to resign. Those who stayed became increasingly concerned and asked him to seek professional help.

Despite internal concerns, Santos continued his campaign, donating $185,000 to the county Republican committee, which endorsed him. Suozzi announced he would not seek reelection to Congress in November 2021, improving Republicans' chances of winning the seat. Unopposed for the Republican nomination, Santos ran against Democrat Robert Zimmerman. Zimmerman's campaign had access to a lengthy opposition research file but chose to focus on voter outreach instead.

In September 2022, The North Shore Leader raised questions about Santos's employment, financial disclosures, and claims of wealth, but other media outlets did not report on the matter until after the election. Santos defeated Zimmerman by 20,420 votes, flipping the district and helping Republicans retake the House. After his victory, numerous outlets reported that much of Santos's biography appeared fabricated. Santos admitted to lying about his education and employment history, while his financial disclosures were inconsistent.

==== 2024 campaign ====
The Santos campaign announced in April 2023 that he would seek re-election in 2024. The state's Conservative and Republican Party chairs said they would not support Santos.

Following the failure of an October 2023 vote to expel him from the House, Santos said he would run again in 2024 even if he was expelled from the House before the election. In November 2023, after the House Ethics Committee's report made further fraud allegations against Santos, he reversed course and announced that he would not seek re-election.

During the 2024 State of the Union Address in March, Santos announced that he would run for the House in New York's 1st congressional district, challenging incumbent Republican Nick LaLota, who had long advocated for Santos's expulsion or resignation. Santos called LaLota a RINO. "[T]o hold a pathological liar who stole an election accountable," LaLota responded, "I led the charge to expel George Santos. If finishing the job requires beating him in a primary, count me in."

On March 22, 2024, Santos announced his departure from the Republican Party, stating that he, "in good conscience, cannot affiliate myself with a party that stands for nothing and falls for everything." He intended to continue his congressional campaign as an independent. On April 23, 2024, Santos dropped out of the race.

=== Tenure ===
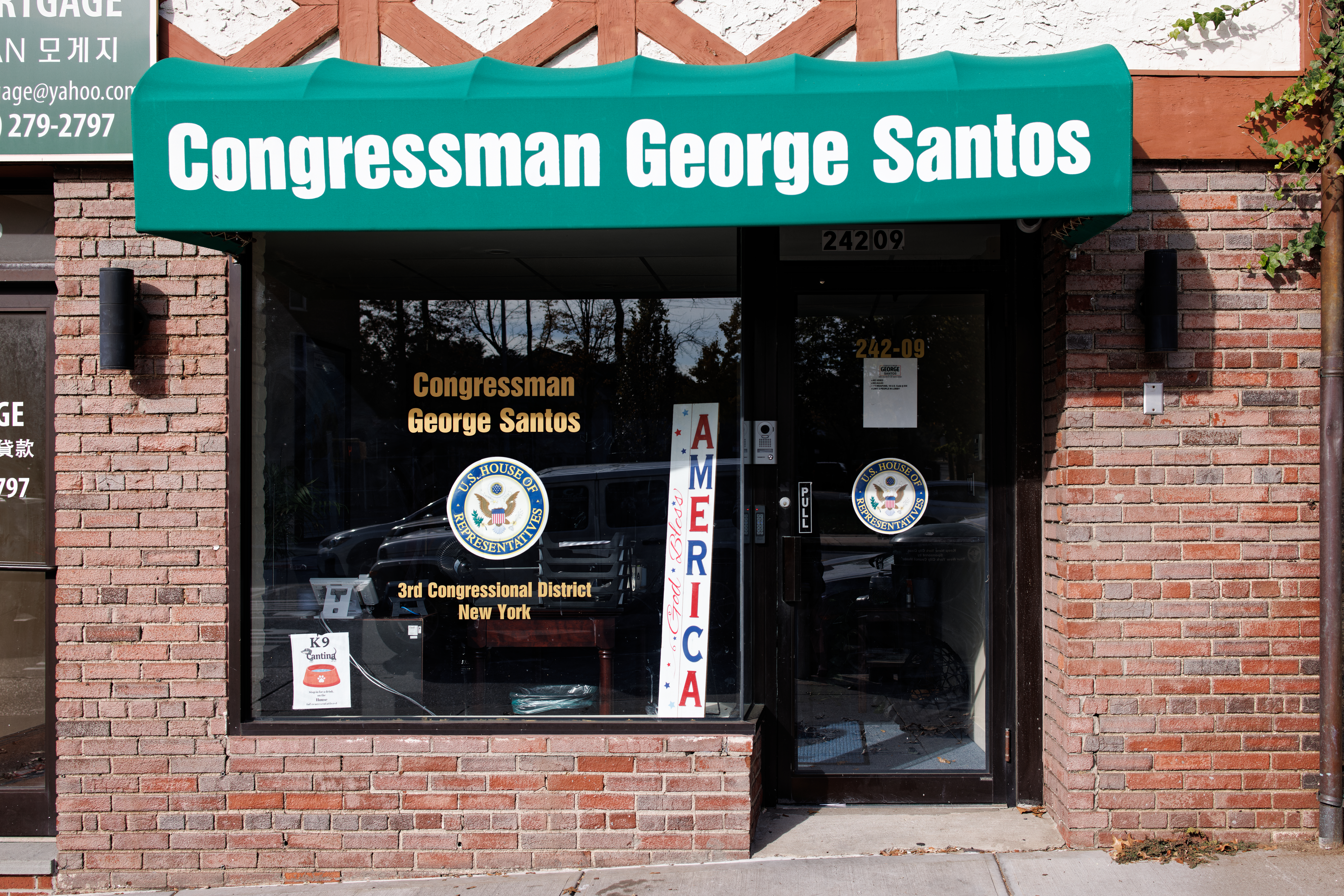
George Santos's constituent office in Douglaston, during his tenure

On January 11, only eight days after the start of his tenure, four Republican New York congressmen who had also been elected in 2022—Anthony D'Esposito, Nick LaLota, Nick Langworthy, and Brandon Williams—called for Santos to resign. The other two freshman Republican members of Congress from New York, Marc Molinaro and Mike Lawler, followed suit. Joseph Cairo, the chair of the Nassau County Republican Party, also called for Santos to resign, saying that he had "disgraced the House of Representatives, and we do not consider him one of our congresspeople".

Santos refused to resign, and kept the support of Republican House leadership, including former House speaker Kevin McCarthy, House majority leader Steve Scalise, and Representative Elise Stefanik (the fourth-highest-ranking House Republican), who relied in part on Santos's vote to support their very narrow (four-seat) House majority. McCarthy did not deny Santos committee assignments or impose any penalty on him for the misrepresentations he made during his campaign. Santos was assigned to the committees on small business and space, science, and technology. On January 31 (two weeks after the assignments were announced), he announced at a meeting of House Republicans that he was vacating his committee memberships, but said the move was temporary; he never rejoined.

In 2023, Santos voted in favor of the key bills supported by the House Republican leadership. After his indictment in May, House Republican leadership reiterated that they would not seek to force Santos to resign or expel him from the House. A subsequent attempt by Democrats to force a vote on an expulsion resolution was blocked and referred to the Committee on Ethics.

Later in 2023, House Democrats announced they would introduce a resolution to censure Santos. Unlike an expulsion, the measure would need only a simple majority to pass. Democrats said that Republicans, who had informally criticized Santos, should have no problem with a censure vote. Five New York Republicans who had already called on Santos to resign—LaLota, Molinaro, D'Esposito, Langworthy and Lawler—said they would vote for censure, as did Ohio Republican Max Miller.

Santos was among the 71 Republicans who voted against final passage of the Fiscal Responsibility Act of 2023 in the House.

In October, Santos voted to keep McCarthy as speaker when eight Republicans joined with House Democrats to remove him. He refused to support Steve Scalise as McCarthy's replacement, since the Louisiana congressman had not personally sought Santos's support.

=== Expulsion resolutions ===
Distribution of votes on the 3rd and ultimately successful attempt to expel George Santos from Congress: Democratic yes Democratic no Democratic not voting Democrat present Republican yes Republican no Republican not voting Santos

In May 2023, after Santos was indicted on federal charges, Robert Garcia and other House Democrats introduced a resolution to expel Santos from the House, which required a two-thirds vote, or 290 votes, in favor. Because an expulsion motion is privileged, the Republican House leadership was required to either schedule a vote within two legislative days, table the proposal or refer it to the Ethics Committee. They introduced a motion to send the resolution to the Ethics Committee. The House approved the motion by 221–204 along party lines; seven Democrats voted "present". After Santos was indicted on additional charges in October, D'Esposito introduced a second expulsion resolution, cosponsored by the other five Republican House freshmen from New York. After Rep. Mike Johnson was elected speaker, the sponsors moved to force a floor vote on the resolution.

On November 1, the expulsion motion failed 213–179, with 19 voting present. Support was mostly from Democrats, joined by 24 Republicans, while 31 Democrats joined Republicans in opposing. California representative Katie Porter, one of those 31, believed that it was wrong to expel Santos before his case had been disposed in the courts or the House Ethics Commission had issued its report. Santos said the result was a victory for due process and dismissed the resolution as a political stunt by his colleagues anxious about their re-election prospects in 2024.

In the wake of the Ethics Committee's report on Santos two weeks later, Garcia announced he would introduce another expulsion resolution, with the expectation that it would be voted on after the Thanksgiving recess. It was seen as possible that some of the representatives who had voted against expelling Santos previously would reconsider their positions in the wake of the report. One, Maryland Democrat Jamie Raskin, said he would vote to expel, as "[t]he report's findings are extremely damning".

Rep. Michael Guest, chair of the Ethics Committee, introduced an expulsion resolution of his own after the report was released. Over the holiday recess, Santos said on an X Space that he expected to be expelled the following week when Congress returned. He said he would "wear it like a badge of honor", called Guest a "pussy" and said that no one from Mississippi was going to push a New Yorker out of Congress. Santos said it was hypocritical of the House to expel him.

On December 1, the House voted to pass Guest's resolution to expel Santos, 311–114. Specifically, 206 Democrats and 105 Republicans voted for the resolution, with two Democrats (Note: Robert C. Scott and Nikema Williams) and 112 Republicans voting against his expulsion. Ten representatives did not vote, with two voting present (Note: Al Green and Jonathan Jackson) and the rest absent. He is the sixth member of the House to be expelled, the only Republican, and the only member expelled without first being convicted of a federal crime or having supported the Confederacy.

After Suozzi won the February 2024 special election to fill Santos's seat, leaving the House Republicans with an even narrower majority, Santos lashed out at his former Republican colleagues who had voted to expel him in a group text. "I hope you guys are happy with this dismal performance and the 10 million dollars your futile Bull Shit cost the party," Santos wrote. "I look very much forward to seeing most of you lose due to your absolute hate filled campaign to remove me from Congress arbitrarily."

== Political positions ==
Politically, Santos has aligned himself with Donald Trump. At a March 2019 event held by the conservative #WalkAway Foundation that encouraged members of the LGBTQ community to leave the Democratic Party, Santos (introducing himself as Anthony Devolder) claimed to have formed a group called United for Trump and asked Blaire White, a transgender YouTuber, how she could "help educate other trans people from not having to follow the narrative that the media and the Democrats put forward". In 2023, Santos attended a rally of supporters outside the Manhattan courthouse where Trump was arraigned on felony charges of falsifying business records.

Santos has called police brutality a "made-up concept". In a 2022 speech to the Whitestone Republican Club in Whitestone, Queens, Santos called abortion "barbaric" and compared it to slavery.

After the October 7, 2023 Hamas attack on Israel, Santos said, "I think every inch of the United States at this point should be mapped out again and completely checked. I don't care if we go into a police state for a couple of months."

== False biographical statements ==
On December 19, 2022, after Santos had been elected to Congress but before he had taken office, The New York Times reported that he had lied about many aspects of his biography. His lawyer denied the allegations. On December 22, New York attorney general Letitia James announced that an investigation had been opened into Santos.

On December 26, Santos broke his silence with interviews on WABC and with The New York Post. He denied being a criminal, saying, "I'm not a fraud. I'm not a criminal who defrauded the entire country and made up this fictional character and ran for Congress". Santos admitted to the Post that he had lied about graduating from college and working for Goldman Sachs and Citigroup. By December 28, federal prosecutors for the Eastern District of New York were investigating Santos's finances, and the Nassau County district attorney was investigating him.

=== Family ===
Santos was raised as a Catholic and has identified himself as a Catholic. At various points in his career, however, he has claimed to be "Jewish", "Jew-ish", "half Jewish", a non-observant Jew, "a proud American Jew", and a "Latino Jew".

In a January 2020 appearance on Talking GOP, a cable TV show he co-hosted, Santos claimed his maternal grandfather grew up Jewish, converted to Catholicism before the Holocaust, and raised his children Catholic. While Santos said that he was Catholic and that he was not "trying to claim Jewish heritage", he added, "I believe we are all Jewish, at the end – because Jesus Christ is Jewish. And if you believe in Jesus, and we're all brothers in Christ, I mean". The video resurfaced in early 2023. More specifically, Santos has claimed that his maternal grandparents were Jewish Holocaust refugees who fled Soviet Ukraine and German-occupied Belgium. On December 21, 2022, following Santos's November 2022 election to Congress, The Forward and Jewish Insider reported that Santos's claims about his family's alleged Jewish heritage were false. His maternal grandparents were born in Brazil, not in Ukraine or Belgium.

During a December 26, 2022 interview, Santos said: "I never claimed to be Jewish. I am Catholic. Because I learned my maternal family had a Jewish background, I said I was 'Jew-ish'". The next day, the Republican Jewish Coalition (RJC) asserted that Santos would no longer be welcome at RJC events because he had "'deceived' the organization and 'misrepresented' his Jewish heritage". In 2023 media appearances, Santos claimed that his claim to Jewish ancestry was vindicated by DNA test kits; however, he did not reveal the DNA information.

==== Mother ====
On his campaign website, Santos wrote that his mother was "the first female executive at a major financial institution", worked in the South Tower of the World Trade Center, and died "a few years later" after surviving the September 11 attacks. On her 2003 visa application, however, his mother stated that she had not been in the country since 1999; in June 2001, Fatima reported that she was living in Brazil. Her actual occupation has been described as domestic worker or home care nurse.

In his February 2023 Piers Morgan interview, Santos insisted his mother had been at the World Trade Center the day of the attack. "It's quite insensitive to try to rehash my mother's legacy", he said. "She wasn't one to mislead me ... I stay convinced that's the truth".

=== Education ===
Santos falsely claimed to hold a bachelor's degree in finance and economics from Baruch College and to have graduated near the top of his class. His claimed period of attendance overlapped with his time in Brazil. In January 2023, Santos falsely told a Republican Party chairman that he had been a "star player" on the Baruch volleyball team (as his LinkBridge supervisor had been), having won the league championship and defeated Yale University. At the time in question, Yale had no men's varsity volleyball team. In a pre-election radio interview, Santos said his supposed volleyball career led to him needing both knees replaced.

Campaign documents claimed that Santos held a master of business administration (MBA) from New York University (NYU) and that he had scored a 710 on the Graduate Management Admission Test (GMAT). In a 2020 podcast, Santos claimed to have paid off his MBA student loans by 2020. The man who lent Santos $5,000 for moving expenses in 2014 recalled that Santos claimed to be a graduate of NYU's business school but seemed not to know its name. (Note: The Stern School of Business)

Santos later admitted that he had never graduated from college. In his interview with Morgan, Santos said that he lied about his college experience to meet perceived societal expectations. He added that he could not afford to attend. Santos said he did not know the source of the spurious GMAT score in his résumé published by the Nassau County Republican Committee. Morgan asked why Santos thought he could get away with lying about his education in a congressional election, and Santos replied that no one had raised any questions about his claims during his 2020 campaign. In a February 2023 Newsmax interview, Santos blamed his résumé lies on the local Republican Party; later, after expulsion from the House, he said that a campaign staffer had written his résumé.

=== Employment ===
Santos has called himself a "seasoned Wall Street financier and investor" and said he had worked for Citigroup and Goldman Sachs, but neither company has any record of him. His campaign website stated that he was "an associate asset manager in the real asset division" of Citigroup, but the company sold its asset management division in 2005, before his claimed period of employment.

Santos worked as a customer service representative at a call center for Dish Network in College Point, Queens from October 2011 to July 2012, overlapping the time he said he worked at Citigroup. He later told the New York Post that his Citigroup claim was "a poor choice of words" and that a subsequent employer had been in "limited partnerships" with those companies. Acquaintances and coworkers said that Santos claimed his family was wealthy and had extensive real estate holdings in the U.S. and Brazil. He repeated this claim during his 2022 congressional campaign, saying that he and his family owned 13 rental properties in New York. No such properties were listed on his campaign's financial disclosure forms or in public records. Santos later admitted to the Post that the claim was false and that he owned no properties as of the end of 2022.

In a November 2022 interview, Santos discussed the 2016 Pulse nightclub shooting that took place in Orlando, saying that his company "lost four employees" there. The New York Times found no connection between the 49 victims killed in the attack and any company named in Santos's biography. In a December 2022 interview, Santos changed his story, saying, "We did lose four people that were going to be coming to work for the company that I was starting up in Orlando".

In August 2023, Santos downplayed the significance of the many false or exaggerated claims he had made related to his job history, saying that he had not posted his résumé online during his campaign. He also noted that "studies show that most people lie on their résumés. It's just unfortunately ... the reality".

=== Residence ===
During his 2020 campaign, Santos gave his address as a residence in Elmhurst, Queens, located outside the district in which he was then seeking office. Santos and his partner later moved to a rowhouse in Whitestone, Queens; its owner said they had moved there in July 2020. In March 2022, Santos told Newsday that he left Whitestone because of an alleged January 2021 vandalism incident. He was registered to vote at the Whitestone address during his congressional campaigns, but did not appear to live there.

== Investigations and legal issues ==
=== House Ethics Committee ===
In January 2023, Ritchie Torres and Dan Goldman, House Democrats from New York, filed an ethics complaint with the House Ethics Committee over Santos's financial disclosure reports. In March, the House Ethics Committee announced a formal inquiry and created a subcommittee to investigate allegations of having failed to provide proper financial disclosures to the House, sexual misconduct, and conflict of interest.

In June, the committee announced that it was expanding its investigation to cover the unemployment fraud alleged in the May 2023 federal indictment of Santos. It announced that it had sought the voluntary cooperation of about 40 witnesses and subpoenaed 30 others.

Two months later, Rep. Steny Hoyer of Maryland, the most senior Democrat in the House and a former member of the party's leadership, wrote the Ethics Committee asking they make public whatever they had found so far about Santos. "More than enough time has passed for the [committee] to conduct a fair and accurate assessment of the veracity of the allegations against Rep. Santos and of the scope of his misconduct", he said.

On November 16, the Ethics Committee released its Investigative Subcommittee's report, accusing Santos of fraud similar to what he had already been criminally charged with, such as diverting campaign funds for personal use, as well as money raised for RedStone Strategies, a super PAC supporting Santos, that donors were told would be used on campaigns. The subcommittee listed some of those personal purposes, including over $4,000 to the Hermès luxury goods company, plastic surgery and Botox, payments of personal credit card bills and other debts, travel to Atlantic City and Las Vegas that had no campaign purpose, and a small amount on OnlyFans subscriptions. In a news release accompanying the report, the committee said "[it]s investigation revealed a complex web of unlawful activity involving Representative Santos's campaign, personal, and business finances ... [He] sought to fraudulently exploit every aspect of his House candidacy for his own personal financial profit." It believed "there was substantial evidence that Representative Santos violated federal criminal laws, some of which are the subject of the pending charges filed against him in court." Santos subsequently announced he would not run for reelection, although he would remain in Congress for the rest of his term. He called the report "a disgusting politicized smear that shows the depths of how low our federal government has sunk."

=== Brazilian check fraud charges ===
After obtaining his high school equivalency diploma, Santos spent time in Brazil. In 2008, he forged checks, stolen from a man his mother was caring for, to buy R$1,313 (about US$700) worth of clothing. He gave his name as Délio. When writing the checks, Santos presented identification bearing his photo but the check owner's name. The store owner became suspicious when the signatures on two checks did not match. A few days later, another young man came in to return a pair of shoes that Délio had bought; the store clerk, who had had to cover the loss, traced Santos through the man's Orkut profile. Santos later admitted to the theft in a message to the clerk and confessed to police before he was charged with check fraud in 2010. The case was archived by a Brazilian court in 2013 because authorities there were unable to locate Santos.

In January 2023, Rio de Janeiro prosecutors announced that they would revive the fraud charges since they knew where Santos was. In March 2023, prosecutors announced a plea bargain with Santos, and in May 2023, Santos formally settled the bad check charges; under the agreement, agreeing to pay 24,000 Brazilian reais (almost US$5,000), with most compensating the defrauded salesman and the remainder donated to charity.

=== Evictions and unpaid judgments ===
Santos was evicted from rented Queens properties three times in the mid-2010s over unpaid rent, resulting in judgments against him which were not disclosed during his campaigns. In a 2016 case, he told the Queens Housing Court that he was mugged on his way there to pay $2,250 in back rent, but police told him they could not take a report at the time, telling him to return later. The New York City Police Department had no record of the incident. In October 2015, an acquaintance who loaned Santos $5,000 for moving expenses obtained a small claims court judgment ordering him to pay the loan back, but Santos did not settle the matter until 2025, after his expulsion from the House. In another eviction case, a Queens court entered a civil judgment of $12,208 against him in 2017. In December 2022, he had yet to pay the judgment, saying he "completely forgot about it".

=== Friends of Pets United ===
Santos operated an animal rescue group called Friends of Pets United (FOPU) from 2013 to 2018. Santos's biographer described FOPU as a vehicle for selling puppies and conducting unaccountable fundraising in the name of better-known rescue groups. His official biography described FOPU as a legitimate non-profit animal rescue organization, but a 2023 investigation by The New York Times found that the group was never authorized to take animals from New York City shelters, it never registered with the New York State Department of Agriculture and Markets as required of animal rescue groups, and it never registered as a charity with the Internal Revenue Service or the state of New York, so there were no public disclosures of its finances. Several beneficiaries of FOPU fundraisers told The Times that Santos gave them less money than he said he collected and then behaved evasively when asked about it, leading them to suspect him of skimming.

In November 2017, Santos was charged with theft by deception in York County, Pennsylvania, after bad checks were written to an Amish dog breeder for puppies sold at a FOPU event. The case was dismissed in May 2021 after Santos paid the breeder and his record was expunged in November 2021. In January 2023, Santos was accused of stealing about $3,000 donated in 2016 to a GoFundMe fundraiser for life-saving surgery for a service dog owned by Richard Osthoff, an impoverished U.S. Navy veteran. The dog did not receive the surgery and died; GoFundMe banned Santos. When asked about the case by The Times and Semafor in 2023, Santos denied knowing or swindling Osthoff, and characterized the accusations as "fake". That same year, the FBI said it was investigating the allegations. References to FOPU were removed from Santos's campaign biography after the media started questioning his other activities.

== Federal prosecution ==
In May 2023, a grand jury in the U.S. District Court for the Eastern District of New York indicted Santos on 13 criminal charges: seven counts of wire fraud, three counts of money laundering, one count of theft of public funds, and two counts of making materially false statements to the House of Representatives. Prosecutors accused Santos of "three distinct schemes": fraudulent solicitation of political contributions, unemployment benefits fraud, and making false statements on the financial disclosure reports he submitted to the House of Representatives. In the fraudulent solicitation scheme, Santos allegedly persuaded two supporters to donate $25,000 each to a limited liability company controlled by him and then used the money for personal expenses. He told them it was a Super PAC and that the money would buy TV ads to support his campaign. During the COVID-19 pandemic, Santos also allegedly obtained a total of $24,000 in unemployment benefits from mid-2020 to April 2021 while drawing an annual salary of $120,000.

At the arraignment the day the indictment was unsealed, Santos pleaded not guilty and was granted pretrial release on a $500,000 bond with conditions, including surrendering his passport and restricting his travel to Long Island, New York City, and Washington, D.C. Afterwards, he told reporters that this was a "witch hunt" and that he was still running for reelection in 2024.

Prosecutors turned over 80,000 pages of material to Santos's lawyers by June 2023.

The names of the guarantors of Santos's $500,000 bail bond were initially under seal. Media outlets sought to unseal the names of the guarantors, a motion Santos opposed. District judge Joanna Seybert denied Santos's appeal and ordered the names unsealed; they were revealed to be Santos's father and aunt. They had not been required to put up any cash or property as collateral for the bond but would be liable for the entire amount if Santos fled.

In August 2023, Santos said he would not consider a plea deal, but a month later prosecutors told the judge that they were both sharing substantial new evidence with Santos and his lawyer while looking at "possible paths forward" with them, raising speculation regarding a possible plea deal, which Santos has denied.

Nancy Marks, who served as treasurer for Santos's campaign, pled guilty in October to charges of conspiracy. According to the charges, in order to meet a Federal Election Commission (FEC) campaign finance reporting threshold and thereby qualify for a Republican National Committee (RNC) campaign support program, she fabricated third-party campaign contributions and falsely reported that Santos had loaned the campaign over $500,000; he did not have adequate assets to have done so. Santos was referred to as "Co-Conspirator No. 1" in her plea agreement, due to the falsifications in his campaign finance reports she admitted to making. "One way or another, the government is going to use that information in his case", said one law professor. Kappel said it was "bad news" for him, noting that the lack of a provision in the agreement that she continue cooperating may indicate that the government has enough evidence implicating Santos to believe her testimony would not be needed to convict him.

=== Superseding indictment ===
Superseding indictment filed October 10, 2023 (document number 50 of the case)

Five days after Marks's plea, prosecutors filed a superseding indictment, alleging 10 additional felonies committed by Santos including conspiracy against the United States, wire fraud, aggravated identity theft, credit card fraud, and money laundering. These charges stemmed from not only the same effort to deceive the RNC that Marks had admitted to, but the unauthorized use of donor credit cards, the money raised by RedStone by lying about its political status and the purpose of the spending, much of which Santos allegedly converted to personal spending on clothing and other luxury items. In an October 27 court appearance, Santos pleaded not guilty to the new charges.

Santos learned of the additional charges when questioned by reporters after leaving a House Republican Conference meeting where he said he had not had access to his phone. He called them "bullshit" and explained that he had not handled any of his campaign finance reports. "I didn't even know what the hell the FEC was" when he first ran for office, Santos said. Later he attributed them to Marks's mistakes and malfeasance. (Note: The House Ethics Committee's report, by contrast, cites former staffers and documentary evidence to show that Santos and Marks had a close personal and work relationship, to the point that the other staffers considered the campaign's finances a "black box" accessible only to the two of them; he was involved enough, his later protestations to the contrary, that he would have been aware of any mistakes she made at the time she made them. Some staffers did bring issues with Marks's competence to Santos's attention. He told them that he would discuss them with her personally, but appeared to do little, if anything, to address the staffers' concerns. He reportedly told some that Marks was "untouchable". The committee also reviewed records from other campaigns on which Marks had served as treasurer and noted that they had a much lower rate of putative errors than Santos'.)

In May 2024, Santos moved to have some of the charges dismissed. The dismissal relied on the Supreme Court ruling in the Dubin case that narrowed the applicability of the identity theft statute to cases where the act was at the crux of a predicate offense. His attorneys therefore argued that even if Santos had used the names of others in his FEC filings and credit card charges, as alleged in the indictment, that would not constitute an aggravated identity theft.

=== Guilty plea ===
On August 19, 2024, Santos pleaded guilty to wire fraud and aggravated identity theft as part of a plea deal in which he also admitted to committing the other crimes with which he was charged in the superseding indictment. "I accept full responsibility for my actions", he told the judge. "I allowed my ambition to cloud my judgment, leading me to make decisions that were unethical and... guilty."

Santos was initially scheduled for sentencing on February 7, 2025. Federal sentencing guidelines call for 6–8 years for the charges he pleaded to, with a possible maximum of 22 years. He will also be required to pay nearly $375,000 in restitution to victims and forfeit an additional $205,000; if he cannot pay the latter amount, his property may be seized. A month before the sentencing, he asked for it to be postponed six months so he can make enough money from his podcast to pay the restitution. The judge set a new sentencing date of April 25, 10 weeks later.

According to Breon Peace, United States attorney for the Eastern District of New York, the plea agreement was secured when Santos agreed to serve at least the two-year minimum required under law for the identity theft charges. While Santos agreed to plead to only two of the 23 counts in the indictment, his admission to the other charges means they can be considered in his sentencing. Peace said Santos also agreed not to appeal any sentence of less than eight years.

=== Sentence ===
Both the government and Santos's lawyers filed sentencing memoranda with the court in April 2025. Prosecutors asked for a sentence of more than seven years, slightly higher than what the Federal Sentencing Guidelines prescribe for his offenses, pointing to the extent of Santos's deception. "He has made a mockery of our election system", they wrote. They also pointed to his Cameo appearances and podcast as evidence Santos was continuing to leverage his crimes for personal gain. His lawyers attributed most of his actions to "a misguided desperation related to his political campaign, rather than inherent malice" and asked for the minimum sentence of two years. One defense attorney called the prosecution's request "draconian". "Long story short," Santos wrote on X, "I will NOT succumb to their soul crushing antics and that makes them furious."

In a later X post, Santos said the DOJ was ignoring the more serious crimes of "the cabal of pedophiles running around in every power structure in the world including the US Government." Two weeks later, prosecutors filed another memo, saying that "this message—which signals defiance and victimhood ... is hardly an expression of 'genuine remorse.'" Santos, they said, was "belligeren[t] ... blaming his situation on everyone except himself."

In response Santos called the DOJ "weaponized" and that its "nonsense memos" were in violation of a court order. He claimed his arguments for a shorter sentence were protected speech under the First Amendment, and that therefore the government should not punish him for them: "My posts may be colorful but they don't justify a sentence triple the norm, and the government should be ashamed of itself for even seeking such a high sentence".

Prosecutors also noted that Santos had yet to pay any of his court-ordered restitution. Days before sentencing, Santos said he was trying to make "some kind of a meaningful attempt" at it. He maintained that he was "genuinely remorseful", and would not ask for a federal pardon from Trump as he did not expect that request to be granted. Due to fears for his safety, he wanted to serve his time in protective custody.

Santos was sentenced to 87 months in federal prison on April 25. He was ordered to surrender by July 25. At the hearing he cried and asked "let me prove that I can still contribute positively to the community I wronged." Judge Seybert was unmoved. "Where is the remorse?" she asked. "Where do I see it?"

Shortly afterwards, his attorney, Joseph Murray, said he was researching how to file an application for executive clemency. Murray added that he believed Santos had been prosecuted primarily because he was a gay Republican who had won a district Biden carried in the 2020 presidential election. Two weeks after being sentenced, Santos told Piers Morgan he was hoping for some sort of relief from Trump. Santos stated that he had given up on seeking a federal pardon in May 2025.

Santos reported as ordered to the Federal Correctional Institution, Fairton, in New Jersey on July 25, 2025.

== Post-congressional career ==
Within three days of his expulsion from Congress, Santos started offering personalized videos on the website Cameo. Steven Galanis, one of the co-founders of the website, said that Santos's videos represented one of "the best launches that [the website] ever had". It was noted that the videos could potentially earn him well over "the $174,000 salary he earned as a member of Congress". Senator John Fetterman spent $343 for a Cameo video from George Santos, as a prank against his colleague, Bob Menendez.

Comedian Jimmy Kimmel paid for videos to see if "there's a line [that Santos] wouldn't cross". Kimmel aired some of the videos on his show, after which Santos demanded $20,000 for the right to broadcast, which Kimmel refused to pay. In response, Santos filed suit in February 2024 against Kimmel, ABC (Kimmel's employer), and the Walt Disney Company (ABC's owner) for $750,000, claiming that Kimmel intended to "ridicule" Santos. Six months later, a judge dismissed the suit, saying that Kimmel's actions constituted "political commentary and criticism," which is protected under the fair use doctrine. The Second Circuit Court of Appeals upheld the dismissal in September 2025.

Santos announced in April 2024 that he would revive his Kitara drag persona for Cameo videos, promising to donate 20 percent of the proceeds to charity. The Tunnel to Towers Foundation, one of the charities to which Santos claimed proceeds from the Cameos would be donated, said he had not informed them of his plans prior to making his announcement. Two months later, Santos announced that he had started an OnlyFans account, but the account would not feature any sexual content and would rather be a behind-the-scenes look at his life and work.

In December, Santos launched a podcast, Pants on Fire, with liberal cohost Naja Hall and him discussing various issues. The weekend before the first episode, a video was uploaded showing someone throwing coffee on Santos as he walked through Times Square. Santos later admitted the incident was staged to promote the podcast and that he had not intended for it to be uploaded.

In August 2026, prediction market platform Kalshi permanently banned George Santos and fined him $71,356 for trading on contracts related to his attendance at the 2026 State of the Union address.

=== Prison ===
After Santos had served a month, it was reported that he had complained about prison conditions in his column for the South Shore Press, a Long Island news outlet. He specifically cited mold and an air conditioning problem that took a long time to repair, and said prison officials had not taken those complaints seriously. He later complained after prison authorities put him in special housing, which he characterized as solitary confinement, due to what they told him was a threat to his life.

=== Commutation ===
On October 17, 2025, President Donald Trump commuted Santos's sentence, resulting in his immediate release from federal prison. Trump announced the commutation on Truth Social, claiming that although Santos was a '"rogue"', he had been "horribly mistreated" in prison and that a seven-year sentence was excessive. Trump's statement also cited Santos's political beliefs as a reason for the commutation, writing: "At least Santos had the Courage, Conviction, and Intelligence to ALWAYS VOTE REPUBLICAN!" Trump's order also canceled the fines and financial restitution that Santos had not paid.

Some of Santos's former colleagues among the New York Republican House delegation who had supported his expulsion decried the move. "George Santos is a convicted con artist", said Nicole Malliotakis. "I disagree with the commutation". LaLota said "he should devote the rest of his life to demonstrating remorse and making restitution to those he wronged." Richard Osthoff, the naval veteran whose service dog died after Santos allegedly never gave him the money raised on GoFundMe for its surgery, said "I feel like I got personally stabbed in the gut by the president of the United States".

Anne Donnelly, the district attorney in Nassau County, where Santos had committed most of his alleged and pleaded offenses, left open the possibility that he could face state charges. "While the office cannot comment on ongoing investigations," she said in a statement, "suffice it to say that I remain focused on prosecuting political corruption wherever it exists regardless of political affiliation." He could even be charged for the same actions that led to the federal case against him, as the U.S. Constitution does not bar separate state and federal prosecutions for the same conduct. Until 2019, New York law had barred the state from prosecuting anyone for the same transaction that led to a federal conviction. Following Trump's pardon of financier Paul Manafort, a law was passed removing that protection from anyone who received a "reprieve, pardon, or other form of clemency" from the president.

=== Prediction market manipulation ===
In June 2026, National Public Radio (NPR) reported that federal authorities were investigating Santos for insider trading for betting on his own appearance at the 2026 State of the Union Address in February 2026. Before the address, Santos posted on social media saying he would attend, but placed bets on the prediction market Kalshi that he would not attend. Kalshi detected the trades and reported them to the United States Department of Justice (DOJ) and the United States Commodity Futures Trading Commission (CFTC). Santos ultimately did not attend. In the wake of the report, Polymarket terminated a paid online sponsorship deal with Santos.

The NPR reporter who wrote the initial Kalshi story, Bobby Allyn, wrote that after it was published, Santos called him and said his lawyers had not found any proof the DOJ was investigating him. (Note: The CFTC, which ultimately investigated and fined Santos, is an independent agency of the executive branch, not under the authority of the DOJ or any other cabinet department.) Santos declined to identify his lawyers when Allyn asked if he could contact them. According to Allyn, Santos then told him "This story is going to get a gun in your face". Santos then made a post on X, claiming that he did not threaten Allyn, that Allyn was lying about it, that he only warned Allyn that the story "would blow up in your face", and that Allyn threatened him to prompt him to reveal his lawyers' names. Santos made the post before Allyn publicized Santos's alleged threat.

Two months after opening the investigation, the CFTC announced that it had filed an order settling the case. Santos, it said, had "engag[ed] in manipulative activity in an event contract—whose underlying event Santos controlled—designed to affect the price of the swap." He was required to pay the agency the profit he made from the trade along with a nearly equal civil penalty, totaling around $35,000. He was also banned from trading for three years. On August 31, Kalshi penalized Santos over $70,000 and banned him from the platform for life, the first time it had ever imposed that sanction. Kalshi cited Santos's "lack of cooperation" with their probe as a reason for the ban.

=== Special Forces: World's Toughest Test ===
In July 2026, Fox announced that Santos would be one of the 14 contestants on the fifth season of its reality show Special Forces: World's Toughest Test along with former athletes and family members of other television stars. The episodes began airing on September 24.

In the first episode, Santos responded to comments about his past. When one of the show's drill sergeants confronted him about being "convicted of wire fraud, money laundering, identity theft, stolen funds you use for personal things – OnlyFans, Botox, stuff that that you wanted to spend money on," Santos answered "I didn't steal any money, sir. I misappropriated funds". Santos said it was "not accurate" that he made the debunked claim that his mother had been present at the World Trade Center attack, but also admitted knowingly lying about his family and heritage. "At one point, I wanted to get caught because it was just so much to carry a lie. Once you tell one lie, you tell a second, you tell a third", he explained. When asked if he believed he had "paid his dues" in prison, Santos responded that he had been "overcharged by this overly zealous court".

== Personal life ==
Santos is openly gay. He was married to a woman from 2012 to 2019, despite previously being out, but lived with men he was involved with from 2013 on. Santos did not widely acknowledge his marriage to the woman, a Brazilian national, until it was reported in December 2022. In statements acknowledging the marriage, Santos said that he loved his then-wife; however, he also said that he had been comfortably and openly gay for at least the preceding decade, an assertion broadly supported by friends, former coworkers, and roommates. Ex-roommate Morey-Parker said that in 2014 the pair were on friendly terms and that they went to social events together. Santos did not deny the marriage, but Santos was also open about his romance with his then-boyfriend and told friends about it.

Santos's coworkers at Dish, who understood him to be gay, speculated in 2012 that perhaps he got married to access his claimed familial wealth, to appease his family's concerns about his sexuality, or to help his wife with her immigration status. Adriana Parizzi, who was a close friend of Santos from Brazil and roommate of his early on in the marriage, says the marriage was purely for immigration purposes and that Santos was paid $20,000 for it. The Washington Post reported that three of Santos's former roommates confirmed this. Santos has denied the allegation. Records show that a filing to dissolve the marriage in May 2013 was withdrawn in December of the same year. Four months later, Santos filed a family-based immigration petition on his wife's behalf; it was approved in July 2014, typically seen as a sign that United States Citizenship and Immigration Services believed the marriage was valid. According to Santos's biographer, the woman has steadfastly refused to talk to the media about her relationship with Santos.

In 2020, Santos said he was living with a partner, whom he has subsequently called his husband. Santos says the couple wed in November 2021. In April 2026 Santos told Meghan McCain that the couple were expecting to become parents later that year. As of April 2026, Santos resides in Northeastern Pennsylvania.

== In popular culture ==
On January 21, 2023, Saturday Night Live featured Bowen Yang as Santos in its cold open and Weekend Update segments. Yang reprised the role on the March 11, 2023, cold open that parodied the red carpet at the 2023 Oscars, where Santos would claim to be Tom Cruise. He returned on October 21, holding a baby during the cold open built around Rep. Jim Jordan's failed bid to become Speaker of the House, and again on December 3 in the cold open about Santos's expulsion from Congress.

Comedian Jon Lovitz portrayed Santos on The Tonight Show Starring Jimmy Fallon, which resulted in a brief Twitter feud between the two. Santos was portrayed by actor Harvey Guillén on The Late Show with Stephen Colbert.

== Electoral history ==
2020 New York's 3rd congressional district election
Party	Candidate	Votes	%
Democratic	Tom Suozzi	196,056	52.6
Working Families	Tom Suozzi	9,203	2.5
Independence	Tom Suozzi	3,296	0.9
Total	Tom Suozzi (incumbent)	208,555	56.0
Republican	George Santos	147,461	39.6
Conservative	George Santos	14,470	3.9
Total	George Santos	161,931	43.5
Libertarian	Howard Rabin	2,156	0.5
Total votes		372,642	100
Democratic hold			

2022 New York's 3rd congressional district election
Party	Candidate	Votes	%
Republican	George Santos	133,859	49.4
Conservative	George Santos	11,965	4.4
Total	George Santos	145,824	53.8
Democratic	Rob Zimmerman	120,045	44.3
Working Families	Rob Zimmerman	5,359	2.0
Total	Rob Zimmerman	125,404	46.2
Total votes		271,228	100
Republican gain from Democratic			

== Awards and nominations ==
Year	Ceremony	Category	Work	Result	Ref.
2024	The Streamer Awards	Best Streamed Collab	Fortnite Friday with ConnorEatsPants	Nominated	

== See also ==
- The Distinguished Gentleman, 1992 comedy film about a con man played by Eddie Murphy getting elected to Congress
- Douglas R. Stringfellow, one-term Utah congressman whose personal history fabrications were revealed
- GaaSyy, Japanese NHK politician and YouTuber, expelled from the House of Councillors in 2023
- List of LGBTQ members of the United States Congress
- List of LGBT people from New York City
- List of United States representatives expelled, censured, or reprimanded
- List of people granted executive clemency in the second Trump presidency

== Works cited ==
- Investigative Subcommittee (2023). In the Matter of Allegations Relating to Representative George Santos (PDF) (Report). United States House Committee on Ethics. Archived (PDF) from the original on November 16, 2023.
- Chiusano, Mark (2023). The Fabulist: The Lying, Grifting, Stealing And Very American Legend of George Santos. New York: One Signal Publishers. ISBN 9781668043677.

U.S. House of Representatives
Preceded by Tom Suozzi	Member of the U.S. House of Representatives from New York's 3rd congressional district 2023	Succeeded by Tom Suozzi
U.S. order of precedence (ceremonial)
Preceded by Joe Sempolinski as Former U.S. Representative	Order of precedence of the United States as Former U.S. Representative	Succeeded by Jean Spencer Ashbrook as Former U.S. Representative
