= Badal (disambiguation) =

Badal is a 2000 Indian Hindi-language film.

Badal or Baadal may also refer to:

== Films ==
- Baadal (1951 film), an Indian Hindi-language film by Amiya Chakravarty
- Baadal (1966 film), an Indian Hindi-language film
- Baadal (1985 film), an Indian Hindi-language film by Anand Sagar

== Places ==
- Badal or Sants-Badal, a neighbourhood of Barcelona
  - Badal (Barcelona Metro), a station in the subway system of Barcelona
- Badal, Charkhi Dadri, a village in Haryana, India
- Badal, Punjab, a village in India
- Badal, Uttar Pradesh, a village in India
- Yeghegnut, Armavir, Armenia, formerly Badal

== People ==
- Bazlur Rahman Badal (1920s–2018), Bangladeshi dancer
- Gurdas Singh Badal (1931–2020), Indian politician of the SAD party
- Gurdev Singh Badal (died 2017)
- Harsimrat Kaur Badal (born 1966), Indian politician of the SAD party
- James Jessen Badal (born 1943), American writer
- Jean Badal (1927–2015), Hungarian-born French cinematographer
- Joseph Badal (born 1944), American novelist and financier
- Keshab Prasad Badal (born 1948), Nepalese politician
- Manpreet Singh Badal (born 1962), Indian politician of the Indian National Congress
- Parkash Singh Badal (1927–2023), Indian politician, Chief Minister of Punjab
- Sukhbir Singh Badal (born 1962), Indian politician of the SAD party
- Badal Rahman (1949–2010), Bangladeshi film director
- Badal Choudhury, Indian politician of the Communist Party of India (Marxist)
- Badal Gupta (1912–1930), Indian nationalist revolutionary
- Badal Patralekh, Indian politician of the Indian National Congress party
- Badal Roy (1939–2022), Indian jazz musician and tabla player
- Badal Sarkar (1925–2011), Indian dramatist

== Other uses ==
- Indian automobile manufacturer Sunrise Industries built two different cars called the Badal and the Badal 4 in the late 1970s
- badal, a main principle of Pashtunwali that encompasses aspects of justice and revenge
- In Arabic grammar, a term for a partitive apposition

== See also ==
- Badla (disambiguation)
- Kot Badal Khan, a village in Punjab, India
- Badalbeyli, Azerbaijani surname, compounded from Badal
