= William Manning =

William Manning may refer to:

- William Manning, an American investment firm founder for whom the Manning rule is named
- William Manning (author) (1747–1814), New England farmer, foot soldier and author of The Key of Libberty
- William Manning (Unitarian) (c. 1630–1711), English ejected minister and Unitarian writer
- William Manning (British politician) (1763–1835), British merchant and politician
- William Montagu Manning (1811–1895), Australian politician
- William Patrick Manning (1845–1915), Australian politician
- Sir William Manning (colonial administrator) (1863–1932), British soldier and colonial administrator
- William T. Manning (1866–1949), American Episcopal bishop
- William Manning (bishop) (fl. 1945–1984), Anglican bishop in Africa
- William Oke Manning (1879–1958), British aerospace engineer
- William Manning (Australian politician) (1903–1986), member of the Legislative Assembly of Western Australia
- Bill Manning, American sports executive, currently the President of Toronto FC and the Toronto Argonauts
