= Badla =

Badla may refer to:

- Badla (stock trading), a carry-forward system in stock trading
- Badla (1943 film), a 1943 Indian Hindi-language film
- Badla (1974 film); see List of Bollywood films of 1974
- Badla (1977 film), a 1977 Indian Marathi-language film
- Badla (1987 film), a Pakistani Urdu-language film
- Badala, Hindi title of the 2005 Indian Telugu-language film Bhadra
- Badla (2019 film), an Indian Hindi-language mystery thriller film
- Badla, Bangladesh, a settlement on the Dhanu River in Bangladesh
- Badla, Purba Bardhaman, a village in West Bengal, India

== See also ==
- Badal (disambiguation)
- Badal (justice/revenge), a main principle of Pashtunwali that encompasses aspects of justice and revenge
- Badlaa
