= Freeriding (stocks) =

Practice of trading without capital

Freeriding is buying and selling stocks or other securities without actually having the capital to cover the trade. In a cash account, a freeriding violation occurs when the investor sells a stock that was purchased with unsettled funds.

The Federal Reserve Board's Regulation T requires brokers to "freeze" accounts that commit freeriding violations for 90 days. Accounts with this restriction can still trade but cannot purchase stocks with unsettled sale proceeds (stocks take one day to settle). Freeriding can often be avoided by using a margin account.

== Trade day plus one day ==
In the United States, stocks take one business day to settle. If you buy a stock on a Monday, you do not have to pay for the purchase until Tuesday. This is known as trade day plus — or T+1. This one-day settlement period is considered an extension of credit from the broker to the customer. Because the transaction is considered a credit issue, the Federal Reserve is responsible for the rule, which is officially called Federal Reserve Board Regulation T.

If a brokerage customer is approved for margin trading, there will be a line of credit to "cushion" the one day settlement period, but there is a limit on it. This credit allows customers to trade while the trade settles. A client in good faith agrees to make full payment of settled funds or to deposit securities within the one-day settlement period and to not sell the newly purchased stock before making such payment.

For accounts without margin (aka "cash accounts"), traders who buy stock shares must have or deposit enough cash in the account on the day they are due (T+1) to pay for the purchases. Likewise, if a trader sells shares, the cash may be credited to their account balance immediately but the trade will not settle for one day. Any stock bought with this unsettled cash must be held until the cash is settled, funds are deposited, or margin is increased, to allow settling of the purchase before a sale.

== Freeriding violation ==
The Securities and Exchange Commission states "In a cash account, an investor must pay for the purchase of a security before selling it. If an investor buys and sells a security before paying for it, the investor is ‘freeriding’ which is not permitted...and may require the investor’s broker to ‘freeze’ the investor’s cash account for 90 days."

If someone is trading rapidly and using all the cash available in the account to buy and sell, that person will likely get a freeriding violation. Clients can still trade during the 90-day restriction, but they lose the ability to make purchases with unsettled sale proceeds.

== Good faith and freeriding ==
The main difference between a good faith violation and freeriding is the eventual deposit of funds to cover the purchase. In freeriding, the buyer sells the security without ever depositing the funds to pay for the initial purchase.

The Federal Reserve considers a good faith violation an "abuse of credit" and requires the broker keep track of them. If the trader has four good faith violations in one year, the broker is required to restrict the account. This is compared to a freeriding violation which results in an automatic restriction.

== Liquidation and freeriding ==
A liquidation violation occurs when the client sells a security to satisfy a cash obligation for the purchase of a different security after the trade date. This is a violation because the sale of the second security will not be settled by the time the first purchase settles. A liquidation violation carries the same penalties as a good faith violation.

== SEC enforcement actions ==
Apart from credit rule violations inherent in freeriding, the more significant and direct harm can come when the customer never pays or deposits to cover the trade, leaving the broker holding the bag (if the trade was a success, the broker nets the trades; however, if it was not, the customer will need to deposit the difference). The Securities and Exchange Commission has brought successful civil injunctive enforcement actions against free riders, with follow-on criminal prosecutions by the U.S. Attorney in New York, where significant prison sentences were imposed, for both credit and antifraud violations where it was clear that the customer never intended to cover the trade and was only using a succession of brokers to play the market, hoping for success, and causing serious losses to brokers. See SEC v. Sholom Teitelbaum, SEC News Digest https://www.sec.gov/news/digest/1981/dig061181.pdf (civil injunctive action, injunction granted) and https://www.sec.gov/news/digest/1981/dig012381.pdf (criminal prosecution, concurrent 18 months sentence).
