= Manning rule =

The term Manning rule is the informal name for a financial industry rule in the United States: Financial Industry Regulatory Authority (FINRA) regulation, Rule 5320. It prohibits a FINRA member firm from placing the firm's interest before/above the financial interests of a client. For example, when a securities firm is holding a customer limit order (an instruction to buy or sell securities at a certain price), the firm cannot ignore that order and cannot trade for their account using a price that would satisfy the customer's limit order without executing the customer limit order.

The rule is applicable both in normal trading hours and in the extended hours trading sessions.

The rule is named after William Manning, a co-founder of Manning & Napier (an investment management firm), who has been an advocate for investor protection.
