= Day trading software =

Financial software

Day trading software is computer software intended to facilitate day trading of stocks or other financial instruments.

== Types of software ==
Day trading software falls into three main categories: data, charting, and trade execution.

=== Data ===
Day traders often subscribe to software platforms which specialize in providing data that helps inform trading decisions. There are several types of data that may be used for trading including price data, reference data, and analysis data. Some market data software products provide data for visualization, while others provide programmatic access via APIs.

==== Price Data ====
Having access to the accurate current price of a security is central to day trading. A day trader needs to know the prices of the stocks, futures, or currencies that they want to trade. In the case of stocks and futures, those prices come from the exchange where they are traded. Forex is a little different as there is no central exchange. Price data often includes trades, which represent transactions that occurred, as well as quotes, which represent the bid and ask prices.

==== Reference Data ====
Day traders also rely on software platforms that provide reference data, which is data that provides background information for a security, such as government filings or recent news. For US stocks, the Securities and Exchange Commission provides programmatic access to recent company filings.

==== Analysis Data ====
Many trading strategies rely on analyzing data derived from historical price data, volume, etc. Options traders often use the greeks which are provided by some market data platforms in conjunction with stock options data. There are also a wide variety of technical indicators which day traders may rely on as signals of future price movement.

=== Charting ===
The vast majority of day traders will chart prices in some kind of charting software. Many charting vendors also supply data feeds.

Charting packages all tend to offer the same basic technical analysis indicators. Advanced packages often include a complete programming language for creating more indicators, or testing different trading strategies.

=== Trade execution ===
Once traders have their data and can see and analyze it on a chart, they will at some point want to place a trade. To do so, they need to use some kind of trade execution software or electronic trading platform. Many trade execution software allow advanced traders to develop their own trading strategies by using an application programming interface.

Most stock brokerage firms will provide proprietary software linked directly to their in-house systems, but many third party applications are available through Independent software vendors. The advantage of third party programs is that they allow the trader to trade through different brokers whilst retaining the same interface. They may also offer a number of advanced features such as automatic trade execution.

== See also ==
- Electronic trading platform
- Extended hours trading
- Bloomberg Terminal
- Reuters 3000 Xtra
- Technical analysis software
- Options-Focused Platform
