= Broker's call =

Relative interest rate

A Broker's call, also known as the Call loan rate, is the interest rate relative to which margin loans are quoted. Individuals may borrow on margin a part of the funds they use to buy their securities from their broker. The broker, in turn, may borrow funds from a bank (with an agreement to repay the bank immediately on call).

The broker has a base rate which is usually the Broker's call rate. The broker's rate is published daily in publications such The Wall Street Journal and Investor's Business Daily. Depending on the amount borrowed, the effective rate will have a percentage added or subtracted with the lowest rates for the most money borrowed. The dollar categories and amounts that are added or subtracted varies with the broker.

The rate paid on such loans is usually based on a benchmark such as LIBOR plus the broker's own margin which typically ranges from about 0.75 – 3.5%.

Since the 2008 financial crisis and consequent bank runs that caused dislocation in overnight borrowing rates (i.e. the effective achievable deposit rates for spare cash), the Futures Commission Merchant has moved away from LIBOR reference and have taken to pricing relative to each exchange's specific margin deposit rate (i.e. on IntercontinentalExchange (ICE) this is the deposit rate 'IDR').
