= Good 'til cancelled =

In investment, a good ’til cancelled (GTC) order is an order to buy or sell a security at a specified price which remains in effect until executed or cancelled by the investor.

In other words, a GTC order will continue indefinitely until the specified parameters are met, whilst a normal day order would cancel automatically after the market closes, requiring the investor to make a new order the next day if desired.
