= Immediate or cancel =

An immediate or cancel (IOC) order, also known as an "accept order", is a finance term used in investment banking or securities transactions that refers "an order to buy or sell a stock that must be executed immediately".

In case the entire order is not available at that moment for purchase a partial fulfillment is possible, but any portion of an IOC order that cannot be filled immediately is cancelled, eliminating the need for manual cancellation. This "partial fulfillment" aspect is what differentiates IOC orders from all or none (AON) and fill or kill (FOK) orders, but the terms might be used interchangeably in some markets.

== Benefits ==
It is considered a "clean, quick, and easy way to acquire securities or goods [that] can save time and money" and the "chances of receiving at least a portion of the order within the time frame required is very good".

IOC orders are generally employed when ordering "large quantities of stock". The term is also used to describe an order for goods, especially when vendors are concerned that "not all items and quantities can be honored within the amount of time required by the customer". Placing an IOC order allows them to fill the order incrementally.

== See also ==
- All or none (AON) orders
