= Fill or kill =

A fill or kill (FOK) order is "an order to buy or sell a stock that must be executed immediately"—a few seconds, customarily—in its entirety; otherwise, the entire order is cancelled; no partial fulfillments are allowed.

Characterized as "extreme orders", FOK orders are "most commonly used when your order is for a large quantity of stock and is usually a market or limit order that requires immediate execution". They are also used when several unlinked markets are available for the same asset, in which case the trader will try to get the whole order filled in each market sequentially, without having to manually cancel each order if it is unfilled.

Conceptually, an FOK order is an Immediate or cancel (IOC) order which is also All or none (AON).
