= Supplementary Leverage Ratio =

A Supplementary Leverage Ratio (SLR) is a type of alternative investment, specifically a hedge, which is essentially a bet that more liquid capital requirements will boost demand for United States Treasury securities (i.e., government bonds). Established in 2014 as an enhancement of the Office of Financial Research's Bank Systemic Risk Monitor as a part of the Basel III reforms, the financial instrument was broadly used in response to the COVID-19 pandemic.

They have been posited as being a minor factor in the 2025 stock market crash, when stocks and bonds did not interact in their typical inverse manner. Margin calls, i.e. demands for collateral, are suspected of having reversed some attempted SLR trades.
