= All or none =

Term in finance

All or none (AON) is a finance term used in investment banking or securities transactions that refers to "an order to buy or sell a stock that must be executed in its entirety, or not executed at all". Partial execution is not acceptable; the order will execute "only if there are enough shares available in a single transaction to cover it".

AON orders are similar to fill or kill (FOK) orders, but the former focuses on "complete vs. partial fulfillment", whereas the latter hinges on the immediacy of the transaction.

== Example ==
If you place an AON order requesting 100 shares of JKL Co. at $2, your stockbroker will not fill that order unless they can obtain the entire 100 shares at $2; if JKL Co. shares are in such high demand that there are only 50 shares available for purchase, then you must wait until the entirety of your order, 100 shares, is available for purchase.

== Disadvantages ==
Price inflation is the main disadvantage of AON orders.

Continuing with the previous example, let's say that three months later, your broker informs you that all 100 shares of JKL Co. are now available for purchase, but the stock price doubled from $2 to $4. Since you did not cancel this AON order, you are then forced to buy all the 100 shares of JKL Co. at double the price you intended. Using an AON limit order will prevent this from happening.

== See also ==
- Fill or kill (FOK) orders
- Immediate or cancel (IOC) orders
- Underwriting
