= Volume (finance) =

Amount of a security traded during a period of time in a capital market

In capital markets, volume, or trading volume, is the amount (total number) of a security (or a given set of securities, or an entire market) that was traded during a given period of time. In the context of a single stock trading on a stock exchange, the volume is commonly reported as the number of shares that changed hands during a given day. The transactions are measured on stocks, bonds, options contracts, futures contracts and commodities.

The average volume of a security over a longer period of time is the total amount traded in that period, divided by the length of the period. Therefore, the unit of measurement for average volume is shares per unit of time, typically per trading day. The volume of trade is a measure of the market's activity and liquidity during a set period of time. Higher trading volumes are considered more positive than lower trading volumes because they mean more liquidity and better order execution.

== Significance ==
Trading volume is usually higher when the price of a security is changing. News about a company's financial status, products, or plans, whether positive or negative, will usually result in a temporary increase in the trade volume of its stock.

Shifts in trade volume can make observed price movements more significant, a point often emphasized in volume analysis as a tool for identifying market trends and reversals. Higher volume indicates greater market liquidity. For institutional investors who wish to sell a large number of shares of a certain stock, lower liquidity will force them to sell the stock slowly over a longer period of time, to avoid losses due to slippage.

== Legal implications ==
In the United States, the Rule 144 of the Securities Act of 1933 restricts the buying or selling of an amount of a security that exceeds a certain fraction of its average trading volume, also known as relative volume. Therefore, the calculation of the trading volume is regulated by the SEC.

== See also ==
- Stock market
- Forex market
