= Badalbeyli =

Badalbeyli (Azerbaijani: Bədəlbəyli), is a surname of Azerbaijani origin. It is also a name connected to a noble family from Azerbaijan. People with this name include:

- Afrasiyab Badalbeyli (1907–1976), Soviet Azerbaijani composer, of Persian descent
- Ahmed Badalbeyli (1884–1954), Soviet Azerbaijani opera singer, mugam singer and actor.
- Farhad Badalbeyli (born 1947), Soviet and Azerbaijani pianist and composer
- Shamsi Badalbeyli (1911–1987), Soviet Azerbaijani theatre director

== See also ==
- Badal (disambiguation)
