= The North Shore Leader =

Newspaper on Long Island, New York

- Type: Weekly newspaper
- Owner: Lally Communications
- Publisher: Grant M. Lally
- Language: English
- Headquarters: Locust Valley, New York, United States
- Website: TheLeaderOnline.com

The North Shore Leader is a weekly newspaper that serves the North Shore area of Long Island, New York. As of 2022, The Leader has a reach of around 20,000 people.

The newspaper was founded in 1955 by John W. Knott Jr. It was acquired by the Lally family in the late 1990s.

== Congressman George Santos ==
Questions about American politician George Santos's finances first emerged in September 2022 in The North Shore Leader,; no other news outlet reported on the story before the election. In the October 20, 2022, edition of the newspaper listing political endorsements, it stated: "This newspaper would like to endorse a Republican for US Congress in NY3 (Oyster Bay, N Hempstead, NE Queens). But the GOP nominee – George Santos – is so bizarre, unprincipled and sketchy that we cannot." The paper's publisher, Grant Lally, had run as a Republican for the same seat in previous years, and its coverage was inspired by tips from those active in local business and party politics.

On December 19, 2022, The New York Times published an exposé related to the issues around Santos, leading to a follow-up piece in The Leader titled, "The Leader Told You So: US Rep-Elect George Santos is a Fraud – and Wanted Criminal."

In December 2022, the paper was named as a recipient of an Americana Award from Semafor for "The Cassandra prize for best unheeded warning" regarding its reporting on Santos.

On January 5, 2023, publisher Lally gave an interview to WNYC public radio describing more details about Santos: "He took one local political leader on a 5 or 6 hour odyssey, across the North Shore of Long Island pointing out lavish homes and claiming he owned them... It was lie on lie on lie on lie."

In a January 2023 television interview with PBS NewsHour, he spoke of the reaction of other publishers of small newspapers: ". . . they're very cheered by this development that we were able to break this story. And it is now a national story, unfortunately, but it is a national story. And we broke it. And it has reenergized a lot of the local newsrooms here in New York, but, also, I think, global — around the U.S."
