= Special memorandum account =

Special memorandum account (SMA) is a margin credit account used for calculating US Regulation T requirements on brokerage accounts. In addition to Initial Margin and Maintenance Margin requirements, the SMA ledger is used to lock in unrealized gains that augment the client's buying power.

According to Regulation T, Section 220.5:

(b) The SMA may contain the following entries:

- Dividend and interest payments;
- Cash not required by this part, including cash deposited to meet a maintenance margin call or to meet any requirement of a self-regulatory organization that is not imposed by this part;
- Proceeds of a sale of securities or cash no longer required on any expired or liquidated security position that may be withdrawn under section 220.4(e) of this part; and
- Margin excess transferred from the margin account under section 220.4(e)(2) of this part.

Regulation T allows transfers from the SMA to be used as margin for new purchases in their margin account. However, exchange rules do not allow these transfers to be used for maintenance margin calls. The SMA balance represents credits that are used only for meeting margin requirements and are not actual funds that could be withdrawn by the client.

Buying Power is always twice the SMA balance.

== Example ==
A customer purchases 1,000 shares of stock 'ABC' on margin at $50 per share. If ABC is currently trading at $70 per share, what is the excess equity or SMA?

A purchase of $50,000 worth of securities (1,000 shares × $50 per share) requires depositing the Regulation T amount (50 percent) of the purchase. Thus, the customer equity (EQ) is originally $25,000 (50% × $50,000) and $25,000 was borrowed on margin. The long market value (LMV) has now increased to $70,000 ($70 × 1,000 shares), but the margin amount ($25,000) remains the same. Thus the EQ ($70,000 - $25,000) has increased to $45,000 and the new Reg T margin requirement would be $35,000 ($70,000 × 50%).

We calculate SMA as follows:

Current Margin requirement = 50% × $70,000
SMA = EQ – Current Margin Requirement
SMA = $45,000 – $35,000 = $10,000
