= Stop price =

A stop price is the price in a stop order that triggers the creation of a market order.

In the case of a Sell on Stop order, a market sell order is triggered when the market price reaches or falls below the stop price. For Buy on Stop orders, a market buy order is triggered when the market price of the stock rises to or above the stop price.

In addition, if a Stop Limit is also indicated in the stop order, the resultant order will be a corresponding limit order as opposed to a market order.
