= Extended-hours trading =

Stock trading outside of trading hours

Extended-hours trading (or electronic trading hours, ETH) is stock trading before or after the trading day regular trading hours (RTH) of a stock exchange, i.e., pre-market trading or after-hours trading.

Market makers and specialists generally do not participate in after-hours trading, which can limit liquidity.

Since 1985, the regular trading hours for major exchanges in the United States, such as the New York Stock Exchange and the Nasdaq stock market, have been from 9:30 a.m. to 4:00 p.m. Eastern Time (ET). Pre-market trading occurs from 4:00 a.m. to 9:30 a.m. ET, although the majority of the volume and liquidity come to the pre-market at 8:00 a.m. ET. After-hours trading on a day with a normal session occurs from 4:00 p.m. to 8:00 p.m. ET. Overnight trading occurs from 8:00 p.m. to 4:00 a.m. ET, and only via electronic communication networks (ECNs) as opposed to stock exchanges.

Example chart of extended-hours trading, via Google Finance

Trading outside regular hours is not a new phenomenon, but used to be limited to high-net-worth investors and institutional investors like mutual funds. The emergence of private trading systems known as electronic communication networks (ECNs) has allowed individual investors to participate in after-hours trading. Extended-hours trading is all processed through ECNs including NYSE Arca. For instance, the Blue Ocean Session is an overnight trading session available Sunday to Thursday on the Blue Ocean Alternative Trading System (Blue Ocean ATS; BOATS) since June 2021. Yahoo Finance began displaying BOATS pricing data circa June 2025.

Financial Industry Regulatory Authority (FINRA) members who voluntarily enter quotations during the after-hours session are required to comply with all applicable limit order protection and display rules (e.g., the Manning rule and the SEC order handling rules).

== Risks and limitations ==
Compared to trading during regular hours, extended-hours trading comes with additional risks. There is typically less volume in extended-hours trading compared to regular hours, which generally implies there will be less liquidity, wider bid–ask spreads, and greater volatility in extended-hours trading. There is no guarantee that prices will carry over between regular sessions and extended-hours sessions as one ends and the other begins. The ratio of professional traders to retail investors participating in extended-hours trading may be greater than during regular hours, thus increasing the risk that the former can exploit the latter.

Many extended-hours ECNs only allow placing limit orders and not other types of buy/sell orders, decreasing flexibility for traders. Access to these ECNs is also somewhat balkanized. Any given broker might only provide its clients access to certain extended-hours ECNs, thus decreasing liquidity within each ECN.

== See also ==
- Trading day
- Stock exchange halts and suspensions
- List of stock exchanges
- List of stock exchange trading hours
