= Capital introduction =

Brokerage's introduction of hedge fund clients to investors

Capital introduction is a term that describes the introductions that a prime brokerage firm makes on behalf of its money managers by introducing hedge fund clients to hedge fund investors. Capital introduction works as a form of "quasi-marketing" whereby clients are introduced to investors without violating SEC rules regarding fund marketing.

In exchange for granting the broker custody (clearing, custody and asset servicing), securities lending, and financing, the hedge fund client is granted access to Capital Introduction services, as well as risk management and consulting services.

Morgan Stanley Prime Brokerage reports to have established the capital introductions concept in 1997 to connect clients with target investors. As hedge funds are by and large unregulated by the SEC, Capital introductions teams are effectively barred from “marketing” a fund, and instead work to “introduce” clients to institutional investors (endowments, foundations, fund of funds, pension funds, family offices and private banks) that have expressed interest in the particular hedge fund strategy. Capital introductions teams are traditionally discouraged from engaging with investors on a particular fund post the introduction, except to garner feedback, as this could be interpreted as marketing.

Capital introductions teams work with both new launches looking for seed, anchor or “day one” capital, in addition to established clients that are already sizable and may be either launching a new product, or looking to increase the size of their current fund. Capital introduction services are often instrumental to new launches, as it can be difficult to raise assets for a new fund. The initial capital raise is critical, as Wells Fargo estimates the break-even point for an established fund to be around $200mm, though smaller structures could require less capital. Historically, funds have launched with anywhere between $5mm and $1Bn in capital day one.

Investors that participate in Capital introductions programs are uncompensated, as the relationship is symbiotic. Investors engage with the team to receive information on potential managers, industry flow and search queries, and in turn, the team is able to provide clients with introductions to interested investors.
