= Manning & Napier =

American imvestment firm

Manning & Napier, Inc.
- Type: Private
- Traded as: NYSE: MN; (2011–2022)
- Founded: 1970; 56 years ago
- Founders: William Manning; William Napier
- Headquarters: Fairport, New York, U.S.
- Key people: Marc O. Mayer (Chairman & CEO); Paul J. Battaglia (CFO); Christopher Briley (CTO)
- Revenue: ▼US$136 million (2019)
- Operating income: ▼US$2.71 million (2019)
- Net income: ▼US$1.43 million (2019)
- AUM: ▼US$19.48 billion (2019)
- Number of employees: c. 300 (2019)
- Website: www.manning-napier.com

Manning & Napier is an investment firm based in Fairport, New York with $20 billion in assets under management. It was traded on NYSE as MN. It has approximately 300 employees as of December 2019.

The company was founded in 1970 by William Manning and William J. Napier. After the 1973 discovery of large-scale insurance fraud at Equity Funding, Manning & Napier and three other advisory companies were censured for insider trading; William Manning had quickly sold the stock after learning of the fraud on March 26, 1973.

Manning & Napier had over $20 million in assets under management for nearly 100 clients in March 1973.

In April 2020, the company received $6.7 million in federally backed small business loans as part of the Paycheck Protection Program. The company received scrutiny over this loan, which meant to protect smaller businesses and ensure they could continue to pay their employees during the COVID-19 pandemic. The New York Times noted PP applicants were not required to prove they were under financial strain and CEO Marc O. Mayer's annual compensation was $5 million. Days after the PPP loan was announced, the company announced they would be paying a dividend to shareholders. On the following day, Manning & Napier stated they were returning the PPP funds.

On April 1, 2022 it was announced that Manning & Napier Inc. would be acquired and taken private by Callodine Group LLC of Boston.
