= Joseph Badal =

American novelist (born 1944)

Joseph Badal (born November 17, 1944) is an American suspense thriller (genre) novelist and notable financier. Badal served in the U.S. Army as a commissioned officer. During the Vietnam War, he served as a captain in the US Army and received several commendations for his performance during the war. He currently resides in New Mexico. He was a member of the New Mexico Small Business Council from 2011 to 2022.

== Chronological bibliography ==
=== Novels ===
- The Pythagorean Solution (Seven Locks Press, 2003, ISBN 978-1-931643-21-4 )
- Terror Cell (Seven Locks Press, 2004, ISBN 978-1-931643-45-0)
- The Nostradamus Secret (Brick Tower Press, 2011, ISBN 978-1-876963-41-5)
- Terror Cell (Suspense Publishing, 2013, ASIN B0065T74EK)
- The Puppy and the Crying Kitty (Suspense Publishing, 2025, ISBN 978-2-921644-45-0)

=== Articles ===
- ""Financing a Home With No Down Payment"" (Real Estate Finance, August 2005)
- ""Loan Modification Programs: A Great Alternative to Refinancing a Mortgage"" (Real Estate Finance, October 2005)
- ""The Advantages of Portfolio Lender Relationships"" (Real Estate Finance, April 2006)
- ""When Mortgage Debt Can Be a Good Thing"" (Real Estate Finance, August 2006)
- ""Mortgage Matters: Why ARMs Make Sense"" (Santa Fe New Mexican, 6/4/2006)
- ""Mortgage Matters: A Case Against Installment Debt"" (Santa Fe New Mexican, 8/6/2006)
- ""Mortgage Matters: The Baby Boomer Effect"" (Santa Fe New Mexican, 10/1/2006)
- ""Mortgage Matters: 100 Percent Financing Can Make Sense"" (Santa Fe New Mexican, 12/3/2006)
- ""Mortgage Lending to a Trust or LLC"" (Real Estate Finance, June 2007)
- ""Exception Lending Versus Exceptional Lending"" (Real Estate Finance, June 2007)
- ""Mortgage Matters: 2007's Real Estate Outlook"" (Santa Fe New Mexican, 2/4/2007)
- ""Using Common Sense to Enrich Alt-A Lending Success"" (2/2007)
- ""Mortgage Matters: Housing Boom Slows"" (Santa Fe New Mexican, 4/1/2007)
- ""Everything You Always Wanted to Know About Jumbos"" (5/2007)
- ""Mortgage Matters: Using Home Equity Wisely"" (Santa Fe New Mexican, 6/3/2007)
- ""Mortgage Matters: In Hard Times, What's A Realtor To Do?"" (Santa Fe New Mexican, 8/5/2007)
- ""Mortgage Matters: Is This 2007... Or 1929?"" (Santa Fe New Mexican, 10/7/2007)
- ""Mortgage Matters: Excess/Excessive Reaction"" (Santa Fe New Mexican, 12/2/2007)

== Careers ==
Joseph Badal graduated with his Bachelor of Science degree in international finance from Temple University and went on to get his MBA from the University of New Mexico before beginning a thirty-five year career in the banking and financial services industry. He is currently CEO of Joseph Badal & Associates, Inc., a financial and management consulting firm.

From 1967 to 1972, (during the Vietnam War) Badal served in the United States Army with a last rank of captain. He served both overseas in Greece, Vietnam, and in the United States during his time of service and was awarded the Bronze Star, the Meritorious Service Medal, and the Army Commendation Medal with oak leaf cluster.

Badal is currently a board member and chairman of the Audit Committee for the Navajo Nation telephone company, Sacred Wind Communications. Badal was also employed by Thornburg Mortgage from 1993 to 2007, when he retired from his positions of senior executive vice president, chief lending officer, and board of directors.

From the years 1981 to 1982 Badal served as a New Mexico State Representative, District 27, New Mexico House of Representatives.
