= Badla (stock trading) =

Indigenous carry-forward system in India

Badla was an indigenous carry-forward system invented on the Bombay Stock Exchange as a solution to the perpetual lack of liquidity in the secondary market. Badla were banned by the Securities and Exchange Board of India (SEBI) in 1993, effective March 1994, amid complaints from foreign investors, with the expectation that it would be replaced by a futures-and-options exchange. Such an exchange was not established and badla were legalized again in 1996 (with a carry-forward limit of Rs 200 million per broker) and banned again on 2 July 2001, following the introduction of futures contracts in 2000.

== Procedure ==
Badla trading involved buying stocks with borrowed money with the stock exchange acting as an intermediary at an interest rate determined by the demand for the underlying stock and a maturity not greater than 70 days. Like a traditional futures contract, badla is a form of leverage; unlike futures, the broker—why the buyer or seller—is responsible for the maintenance of the marked-to-market margin.

=== Example ===
The mechanism of badla finance can be explained with the following example: Suppose A wants to buy shares of a company but does not have enough money now. If A values the shares more than their current price, A can do a badla transaction. Suppose there is a badla financier B who has enough money to purchase the shares, so on A's request, B purchases the shares and gives the money to his broker. The broker gives the money to exchange and the shares are transferred to B. But the exchange keeps the shares with itself on behalf of B. Now, say one month later, when A has enough money, he gives this money to B and takes the shares. The money that A gives to B is slightly higher than the total value of the shares. This difference between the two values is the interest as badla finance is treated as a loan from B to A. The rate of interest is decided by the exchange and it changes from time to time.
