= Margin (finance) =

Type of financial collateral used to cover credit risk

In finance, margin is the collateral that a holder of a financial instrument has to deposit with a counterparty (most often a broker or an exchange) to cover some or all of the credit risk the holder poses for the counterparty. This risk can arise if the holder has done any of the following:

- Borrowed cash from the counterparty to buy financial instruments,
- Borrowed financial instruments to sell them short,
- Entered into a derivative contract.

The collateral for a margin account can be the cash deposited in the account or securities provided, and represents the funds available to the account holder for further share trading. On United States futures exchanges, margins were formerly called performance bonds. Most of the exchanges today use SPAN ("Standard Portfolio Analysis of Risk") methodology, which was developed by the Chicago Mercantile Exchange in 1988, for calculating margins for options and futures.

== Margin account ==
A margin account is a loan account with a broker which can be used for share trading. The funds available under the margin loan are determined by the broker based on the securities owned and provided by the trader, which act as collateral for the loan. The broker usually has the right to change the percentage of the value of each security it will allow toward further advances to the trader, and may consequently make a margin call if the balance available falls below the amount actually utilised. In any event, the broker will usually charge interest and other fees on the amount drawn on the margin account.

If the cash balance of a margin account is negative, the amount is owed to the broker, and usually attracts interest. If the cash balance is positive, the money is available to the account holder to reinvest, or may be withdrawn by the holder or left in the account and may earn interest. In terms of futures and cleared derivatives, the margin balance would refer to the total value of collateral pledged to the CCP (central counterparty clearing) and or futures commission merchants.

== Margin buying ==
Margin buying refers to the buying of securities with cash borrowed from a broker, using the bought securities as collateral. This has the effect of magnifying any profit or loss made on the securities. The securities serve as collateral for the loan. The net value—the difference between the value of the securities and the loan—is initially equal to the amount of one's own cash used. This difference has to stay above a minimum margin requirement, the purpose of which is to protect the broker against a fall in the value of the securities to the point that the investor can no longer cover the loan.

Margin lending became popular in the late 1800s as a means to finance railroads. In the 1920s, margin requirements were loose. In other words, brokers required investors to put in very little of their own money, whereas today, the Federal Reserve's margin requirement (under Regulation T) limits debt to 50 percent. During the 1920s leverage rates of up to 90 percent debt were not uncommon. When the stock market started to contract, many individuals received margin calls. They had to deliver more money to their brokers or their shares would be sold. Since many individuals did not have the equity to cover their margin positions, their shares were sold, causing further market declines and further margin calls. This was one of the major contributing factors which led to the stock market crash of 1929, which in turn contributed to the Great Depression. However, as reported in Peter Rappoport and Eugene N. White's 1994 paper published in The American Economic Review, "Was the Crash of 1929 Expected", all sources indicate that beginning in either late 1928 or early 1929, "margin requirements began to rise to historic new levels. The typical peak rates on brokers' loans were 40–50 percent. Brokerage houses followed suit and demanded higher margin from investors".

For example, Jane buys a share in a company for $100 using $20 of her own money and $80 borrowed from her broker. The net value (the share price minus the amount borrowed) is $20. The broker has a minimum margin requirement of $10. Suppose the share price drops to $85. The net value is now only $5 (the previous net value of $20 minus the share's $15 drop in price), so, to maintain the broker's minimum margin, Jane needs to increase this net value to $10 or more, either by selling the share or repaying part of the loan.

== Short selling ==
Short selling refers to the selling of securities that the trader does not own, borrowing them from a broker, and using the cash as collateral. This has the effect of reversing any profit or loss made on the securities. The initial cash deposited by the trader, together with the amount obtained from the sale, serve as collateral for the loan. The net value—the difference between the cash amount and the value of loan security—is initially equal to the amount of one's own cash used. This difference has to stay above a minimum margin requirement, the purpose of which is to protect the broker against a rise in the value of the borrowed securities to the point that the investor can no longer cover the loan.

For example, Jane sells a share of stock she does not own for $100 and puts $20 of her own money as collateral, resulting $120 cash in the account. The net value (the cash amount minus the share price) is $20. The broker has a minimum margin requirement of $10. Suppose the share price rises to $115. The net value is now only $5 (the previous net value of $20 minus the share's $15 rise in price), so, to maintain the broker's minimum margin, Jane needs to increase this net value to $10 or more, either by buying the share back or depositing additional cash.

== Types of margin requirements ==
- The current liquidating margin is the value of a security's position if the position were liquidated now. In other words, if the holder has a short position, this is the money needed to buy back; if they are long, it is the money they can raise by selling it.
- The variation margin or mark to market is not collateral, but a daily payment of profits and losses. Futures are marked-to-market every day, so the current price is compared to the previous day's price. The profit or loss on the day of a position is then paid to or debited from the holder by the futures exchange. This is possible, because the exchange is the central counterparty to all contracts, and the number of long contracts equals the number of short contracts. Certain other exchange traded derivatives, such as options on futures contracts, are marked-to-market in the same way.
- The seller of an option has the obligation to deliver the underlying security associated with the option when it is exercised. To ensure they can fulfill this obligation, they have to deposit collateral. This premium margin is equal to the premium that they would need to pay to buy back the option and close out their position.
- Additional margin is intended to cover a potential fall in the value of the position on the following trading day. This is calculated as the potential loss in a worst-case scenario.
- SMA and portfolio margins offer alternative rules for U.S. and NYSE regulatory margin requirements.

== Margin strategies ==
Enhanced leverage is a strategy offered by some brokers that provides 4:1 or 6+:1 leverage. This requires maintaining two sets of accounts, long and short.

Example 1
An investor sells a put option, where the buyer has the right to require the seller to buy his 100 shares in Universal Widgets S.A. at 90¢. He receives an option premium of 14¢. The value of the option is 14¢, so this is the premium margin. The exchange has calculated, using historical prices, that the option value will not exceed 17¢ the next day, with 99% certainty. Therefore, the additional margin requirement is set at 3¢, and the investor has to post at least 14¢ (obtained from the sale) + 3¢ = 17¢ in his margin account as collateral.

Example 2
Futures contracts on sweet crude oil closed the day at $65. The exchange sets the additional margin requirement at $2, which the holder of a long position pays as collateral in his margin account. A day later, the futures close at $66. The exchange now pays the profit of $1 in the mark-to-market to the holder. The margin account still holds only the $2.

Example 3
An investor is long 50 shares in Universal Widgets Ltd, trading at 120 pence (£1.20) each. The broker sets an additional margin requirement of 20 pence per share, so £10 for the total position. The current liquidating margin is currently £60 "in favour of the investor". The minimum margin requirement is now -£60 + £10 = -£50. In other words, the investor can run a deficit of £50 in his margin account and still fulfil his margin obligations. This is the same as saying he can borrow up to £50 from the broker.

== Initial and maintenance margin requirements ==
The initial margin requirement is the amount of collateral required to open a position. Thereafter, the collateral required until the position is closed is the maintenance requirement. The maintenance requirement is the minimum amount of collateral required to keep the position open and is generally lower than the initial requirement. This allows the price to move against the margin without forcing a margin call immediately after the initial transaction. When the total value of the collateral dips below the maintenance margin requirement, the position holder must pledge additional collateral to bring their total balance back up to or above the initial margin requirement. On instruments determined to be especially risky, however, either regulators, the exchange, or the broker may set the maintenance requirement higher than normal or equal to the initial requirement to reduce their exposure to the risk accepted by the trader. For speculative futures and derivatives clearing accounts futures commission merchants may charge a premium or margin multiplier to exchange requirements. This is typically an additional 10%–25%.

== Margin call ==
The broker may at any time revise the value of the collateral securities (margin) after the estimation of the risk, based, for example, on market factors. If this results in the market value of the collateral securities for a margin account falling below the revised margin, the broker or exchange immediately issues a margin call, requiring the investor to bring the margin account back into line. To do so, the investor must either pay funds (the call) into the margin account, provide additional collateral, or dispose of some of the securities. If the investor fails to bring the account back into line, the broker can sell the investor's collateral securities to bring the account back into line.

If a margin call occurs unexpectedly, it can cause a domino effect of selling, which will lead to other margin calls, effectively crashing an asset class or group of asset classes. The "Bunker Hunt Day" crash of the silver market on Silver Thursday, 27 March 1980, is one such example. This situation most frequently happens as a result of an adverse change in the market value of the leveraged asset or contract. It could also happen when the margin requirement is raised, either due to increased volatility or due to legislation. In extreme cases, certain securities may cease to qualify for margin trading; in such a case, the brokerage will require the trader to either fully fund their position, or to liquidate it.

== Price of stock for margin calls ==
The minimum margin requirement, sometimes called the maintenance margin requirement, is the ratio of (stock equity − leveraged dollars) to stock equity, where "stock equity" is the stock price multiplied by the number of shares bought and "leveraged dollars" is the amount borrowed in the margin account.

For instance, assume that an investor bought 1,000 shares of a company each priced at $50. If the initial margin requirement were 60%, then stock equity = $50 × 1,000 = $50,000 and leveraged dollars (or amount borrowed) = $50,000 × (100% − 60%) = $20,000.

If the maintenance margin changed to 25%, then the customer would have to maintain a net value equal to 25% of the total stock equity. That means that he or she would have to maintain net equity of $50,000 × 0.25 = $12,500. At what price would the investor get a margin call? For stock price P the stock equity would be (in this example) 1,000P.

- (Current Market Value − Amount Borrowed) / Current Market Value = 25%
- (1,000P - 20,000) / 1000P = 0.25
- (1,000P - 20,000) = 250P
- 750P = 20,000
- P = 20,000/750 = 26.67

So if the stock price dropped from $50 to $26.67, then the investor would be called to add additional funds to the account to make up for the loss in stock equity.

Alternatively, one can calculate P using $\textstyle P=P_0\frac{(1-\text{initial margin requirement})}{(1-\text{maintenance margin requirement})}$ where P_{0} is the initial price of the stock. Using the same example to demonstrate this:

$P=\$50\frac{(1-0.6)}{(1-0.25)} = \$26.66.$

== Reduced margins ==
Margin requirements are reduced for positions that offset each other. For instance spread traders who have offsetting futures contracts do not have to deposit collateral both for their short position and their long position. The exchange calculates the loss in a worst-case scenario of the total position. Similarly an investor who creates a collar has reduced risk since any loss on the call is offset by a gain in the stock, and a large loss in the stock is offset by a gain on the put; in general, covered calls have less strict requirements than naked call writing.

== Margin-equity ratio ==
The margin-equity ratio is a term used by speculators, representing the amount of their trading capital that is being held as margin at any particular time. Traders would rarely (and unadvisedly) hold 100% of their capital as margin. The probability of losing their entire capital at some point would be high. By contrast, if the margin-equity ratio is so low as to make the trader's capital equal to the value of the futures contract itself, then they would not profit from the inherent leverage implicit in futures trading. A conservative trader might hold a margin-equity ratio of 15%, while a more aggressive trader might hold 40%.

== Return on margin ==
Return on margin (ROM) is often used to judge performance because it represents the net gain or net loss compared to the exchange's perceived risk as reflected in required margin. ROM may be calculated (realized return) / (initial margin). The annualized ROM is equal to

(ROM + 1)^{(1/trade duration in years)} - 1

For example, if a trader earns 10% on margin in two months, that would be about 77% annualized

Annualized ROM = (ROM +1)^{1/(2/12)} - 1

that is, Annualized ROM = 1.1^{6} - 1 = 77%

Sometimes, return on margin will also take into account peripheral charges such as brokerage fees and interest paid on the sum borrowed. The margin interest rate is usually based on the broker's call.

== See also ==
- Badla system – Indigenous carry-forward system in India
- Collateral management – Prevention of payment default by trading partners
- Credit default swap – Financial swap agreement in case of default
- Leverage – Use of borrowed funds in the purchase of an asset
- LIBOR – Interest rate benchmark
- Margin at risk – Measure estimating potential margin shortfalls under adverse market moves
- Portfolio margin
- Repurchase agreement – Form of short-term borrowing
- Short selling – Selling unowned financial securities
- Special memorandum account
- Supplementary Leverage Ratio
- x-Valuation Adjustment – Banking valuation adjustments
