= Trading day =

Time span that a stock exchange is open

In business, the trading day or regular trading hours (RTH) is the time span that a stock exchange is open, as opposed to electronic or extended trading hours (ETH). For example, the New York Stock Exchange is, as of the year 2026, open from 9:30 AM Eastern Time to 4:00 PM Eastern Time. Trading days are usually Monday through Friday. When a trading day ends, all trading ends and is frozen in time until the next trading day begins. There are several special circumstances which would lead to a shortened trading day, or no trading day at all, such as on holidays or on days when a state funeral of a head of state is scheduled to take place.

== NYSE and NASDAQ ==
The NYSE and NASDAQ average about 251 trading days a year. This is from 365.2425 (days on average per year) * 5/7 (proportion work days per week) - 10 (holidays) = 250.8875 ≈ 251.

The holidays where the stock exchange is closed are New Year's Day, Martin Luther King Jr. Day, Presidents' Day, Good Friday, Memorial Day, Juneteenth, Independence Day, Labor Day, Thanksgiving Day, and Christmas Day; there are also some holidays where trading is permitted, including Columbus Day, Veterans Day, and New Year's Eve. If Juneteenth, Independence Day, Christmas Day and New Year's Day fall on a weekend, the public holiday is observed on the preceding Friday (for a Saturday holiday) or the following Monday (For a Sunday holiday) instead, meaning that every holiday results in one fewer trading day.

Up to three trading days (July 3, the day after Thanksgiving, and Christmas Eve) are shortened, i.e. the exchanges are open from 9:30AM–1:00PM, depending on where they fall in the calendar year (if July 3 or Christmas Eve fall on a weekend, the shortened day is simply skipped).

Juneteenth was declared a national holiday on June 17, 2021. It was first observed as a national holiday and a market holiday on June 20, 2022.

== Trading day time zones ==
Each stock exchange has opening hours that are based on specific time zones. People can trade in these exchanges remotely using electronic trading platforms. For those trading in different parts of the world, there are unique trading days based on the hours associated with any given time zone. For example, NASDAQ is open 9:30–16:00 ET and anyone outside of the Eastern Time Zone will have a different trading day (for example, in Vancouver a trading day would run from 6:30–13:00). During the part of the year when North America is on standard time, it would be 17:30–24:00 in Moscow, and in Shanghai it would be 22:30–5:00. Remote traders should find their trading hours based on the stock exchange's hours and time zone.

== See also ==
- Extended-hours trading
- List of stock exchange trading hours
- List of stock exchanges
