= Regulation T =

Federal Reserve Board Regulation T (also referred to as Reg T) is 12 CFR §220 – Code of Federal Regulations, Title 12, Chapter II, Subchapter A, Part 220 (Credit by Brokers and Dealers).

Regulation T governs the extension of credit by securities brokers and dealers in the United States. Its best-known function is the control of margin requirements for stocks bought on margin. The initial margin requirement for such margin stock purchases has been 50% since 1974, but Regulation T gives the Federal Reserve the authority to change this percentage. Raising the margin requirement ostensibly reduces risk in the financial system by reducing the potential leverage and total buying power of investors. Conversely, lowering the margin requirement increases systemic risk by expanding the buying power and leverage available to investors. Since 1974, the Federal Reserve has not deemed it necessary to adjust the margin requirement despite periodic extremes of price volatility in the equities markets.
