= List of electronic trading platforms =

List of financial trading software platforms

This is a list of electronic trading platforms which are computer systems or online applications used to place, route, or execute financial market orders electronically. These electronic trading platforms may provide access to multiple asset classes, including equities, foreign exchange, futures, options, and other traded financial instruments.

== Trading platforms ==
- Ally Invest
- Charles Schwab
- CMC Markets
- CommSec
- CQG
- cTrader
- DEGIRO
- E*TRADE
- Electronic Broking Services
- eToro
- Fidelity
- FinecoBank
- Firstrade Securities
- Forex.com
- FXCM
- FxPro
- Interactive Brokers
- IQ Option
- Lightspeed Trading
- M1 Finance
- Merrill Edge
- MetaTrader 4
- MetaTrader 5
- Moomoo
- MultiCharts
- NinjaTrader
- Nordnet
- OANDA
- Pepperstone
- Plus500
- Public.com
- Questrade
- Robinhood
- Saxo Bank (SaxoTraderGO)
- Sharesies
- SoFi Invest
- Stake
- Swissquote
- Tastytrade
- Thinkorswim
- Trade Republic
- TradeStation
- Trading 212
- TradingView
- Wealthsimple
- Webull

== Institutional and professional trading systems ==
- Aladdin (BlackRock)
- Bloomberg Terminal
- Eikon
- Liquidnet
- MarketAxess
- REDI
- Tradeweb

== Algorithmic trading ==
- Marketcetera

== Cryptocurrency trading platforms ==
- Binance
- Bitfinex
- BitFlyer
- Bitget
- Bithumb
- Bitkub
- Bitmart
- BitMEX
- Bitstamp
- Bitvavo
- Bullish
- Bybit
- Coinbase
- Coincheck
- CoinJar
- Coinsquare
- Crypto.com
- EDX Markets
- Gemini
- HTX
- Independent Reserve
- Kraken
- KuCoin
- OKX
- PancakeSwap
- Poloniex
- Rain
- Ripio
- SFOX
- ShapeShift
- Uniswap
- Upbit

== Defunct electronic trading platforms ==
- CATS (trading system)
- Cotation Assistée en Continu
- D2000-2
- Direct Edge
- FTX
- Inet
- Matchbook FX
- OTC Bulletin Board
- Reuters 3000 Xtra
- Russian Trading System
- SecFinex
- SEAQ
- SuperDot
- SWX Europe
- TAURUS
- TradElect

== See also ==
- Alternative trading system
- Brokerage
- Electronic communication network
- Electronic trading platform
- Foreign exchange aggregator
- Foreign exchange market
- Futures contract
- Futures exchange
- Interbank foreign exchange market
- List of books about investing
- List of electronic trading protocols
- List of financial market information services
- List of online brokerages
- List of stock exchanges
- Retail foreign exchange trading
