= Forex.com =

FX and CFD trading brand

- Type: Brand
- Industry: Financial services
- Founded: 2004
- Founder: Mark Galant
- Headquarters: Warren, New Jersey, United States
- Products: CFD trading; Forex trading
- Parent: StoneX Group
- Website: forex.com

Forex.com is a foreign exchange (FX) and contracts for difference (CFD) trading brand owned by StoneX Group. In the United States, it is operated by GAIN Capital Group LLC, a wholly owned subsidiary of StoneX Group Inc.. The brand offers leveraged trading in currencies, commodities, indices, and cryptocurrencies.

== History ==
GAIN Capital was founded in 1999 by Mark Galant and launched the Forex.com brand in 2004 for retail trading clients.

In 2008, Gain Capital acquired a UK FSA-regulated broker, rebranded it as Forex.com UK, and launched operations across the UK and continental Europe in May 2009. By then, monthly trading volume was close to $200 billion. In September 2009, the broker launched Forex.com in Japan through Fortune Capital, in which GAIN Capital held a controlling interest, and in 2010 opened a Hong Kong office and partnered with Polaris Securities. By the early 2010s, Forex.com operated in North America, Europe, and Asia-Pacific.

Forex.com purchased dbFX from Deutsche Bank in 2011, adding 1,650 clients and $55 million in assets. In 2013, it acquired Sydney-based Global Futures & Forex (GFT), bringing combined client assets above $650 million. In 2014, its Japanese division took over the client base of Planex Trade FX.

GAIN Capital agreed to acquire UK-based broker City Index in October 2014, and completed the acquisition on 1 April 2015.

In January 2015, in the aftermath of the Swiss franc cap removal, Gain Capital announced that it would reset all accounts with negative balances. Two years later, the company took over more than 47,000 U.S. retail accounts from FXCM, adding $142 million in client assets after FXCM's regulatory settlement with the CFTC.

Forex.com expanded its cryptocurrency CFD offering in 2018 by adding Ethereum, Litecoin, XRP, and Bitcoin Cash for clients in the UK, Europe, Australia, and Singapore. In 2020, GAIN Capital was acquired by StoneX Group for $236 million, bringing Forex.com into the publicly traded financial services group.

In 2021, Forex.com entered Latin America, offering services there under its Cayman Islands license. In 2022, it broadened its Canadian offering to more than 2,500 CFD markets. It also launched automated trading features for U.S. clients in partnership with Capitalise.ai. In May 2025, Forex.com launched operations in Singapore.

In May 2025, Forex.com expanded its partnership with Capitalise.ai to offer automated trading tools to clients in the European Union and the United Kingdom.

In September 2025, Forex.com introduced 24/7 trading in cryptocurrency CFDs.

In late 2025, StoneX launched Forex.com in Australia, where the brand operates through StoneX Financial Pty Ltd.

In August 2026, Forex.com launched overnight trading in CFDs and knock-out options referencing 25 Japanese equities, with selected instruments available until 5:00 a.m. JST.

== Operations ==
Forex.com is headquartered in Warren, New Jersey, and operates internationally through regulated StoneX entities, including entities overseen by the U.S. CFTC and NFA, Australia's ASIC, the UK's FCA, Japan's FSA, Canada's Canadian Investment Regulatory Organization (CIRO), the Cyprus Securities and Exchange Commission (CySEC), the Monetary Authority of Singapore (MAS), and the Cayman Islands Monetary Authority (CIMA).

In a 2023 disclosure, Forex.com stated that it held over $8.5 billion in trader assets and had approved 750,000 clients globally since 2019. In June 2026, GAIN Capital held $197.1 million in U.S. retail forex obligations, the largest figure among the six U.S. retail forex dealers covered by the CFTC, representing 42.6% of the total.

In January 2026, GAIN Capital UK said it planned to surrender its Financial Conduct Authority (FCA) authorisation; StoneX said that its UK-regulated entity StoneX Financial Ltd would continue operating Forex.com in the UK, and that a Category 5 licence obtained in August 2025 from the UAE's then Securities and Commodities Authority (SCA) was intended to support growth in the Middle East alongside the group's other licences.

== Controversies ==
=== Regulatory and compliance issues ===
The broker has been subject to several regulatory actions for compliance violations. These include a $500,000 fine from the CFTC for onboarding U.S. clients through a UK entity and a $300,000 penalty for supervisory failures over client accounts. In 2010, the NFA fined GAIN Capital $459,000 for unfair slippage practices, margin handling, and poor supervision.

On 31 March 2021, a system error led Forex.com to display outdated quotes for 14 FX pairs for over 10 hours. Dozens of trades were executed at stale prices, creating account imbalances. The company reversed $2.84 million in client gains and credited minor adjustments to others. In 2022, the NFA fined the company $700,000 for mishandling the incident, rule violations, and misleading regulators.

=== Lawsuits and legal disputes ===
In 2013, Gain Capital was sued by UK investors who alleged it enabled trading for Cameron Farley Ltd., an unlicensed broker operating a Ponzi scheme. Between 2004 and 2008, Cameron Farley, founded by Stephen Farley, lost over £10 million via Forex.com, while total client losses exceeded £18 million. Plaintiffs claimed the company failed to perform due diligence and indirectly facilitated the fraud by allowing thousands of individuals to trade through an unlicensed intermediary.

In July 2020, a Chinese trader Jun Zhang sued Gain Capital after losing $143,032 while trading at Forex.com. Zhang attributed the loss to the negative pricing of WTI futures and to Gain's system, which halted 22 minutes before the close of U.S. crude oil trading on 20 April 2020. On 21 April 2020, the platform showed US_OIL at $0.01.

In 2021, Canadian broker OANDA filed an amended patent infringement complaint against GAIN Capital, accusing Forex.com of infringing patents related to price quoting and trade execution. In February 2024, a U.S. federal court dismissed OANDA's patent claims against StoneX in a separate case, finding the asserted patents were not "sufficiently inventive" to proceed. The New Jersey lawsuit continued in 2025, but OANDA and GAIN Capital settled it in February 2026. All claims and counterclaims were dismissed with prejudice, with each party bearing its own legal costs.

=== Security and insider trading incidents ===
In April 2020, the Japanese unit of Forex.com suffered a data breach in which client personal data was exposed to an unauthorized third party.

In 2020, after the acquisition by StoneX Group, Joseph Conlan, a former GAIN Capital executive, profited from insider information about the deal. In 2023, he settled charges with the U.S. SEC, agreeing to pay $159,389 in disgorgement and penalties.

== See also ==
- List of electronic trading platforms
