= Degiro =

Dutch online brokerage platform

- Formerly: Degiro B.V.
- Type: Online brokerage platform
- Industry: Financial services
- Founded: 2008
- Headquarters: Amsterdam, Netherlands
- Services: Stockbroker; Electronic trading platform; Brokerage
- Owner: Flatexdegiro SE
- Parent: Flatexdegiro Bank SE
- Website: www.degiro.com

Degiro (stylised as DEGIRO) is a Dutch online brokerage platform based in Amsterdam. It began as an institutional broker in 2008 and launched retail brokerage services for private investors in the Netherlands in 2013. Degiro later expanded across Europe and became one of the largest brokers in Europe.

In December 2019, German online brokerage group Flatex AG agreed to acquire Degiro B.V. for about €250 million. In 2021, Degiro B.V. was legally merged into Flatexdegiro Bank AG, becoming the bank's Dutch branch. Degiro continues to operate as a separate brokerage brand within Flatexdegiro SE.

Degiro has also faced Dutch regulatory actions and client dispute rulings concerning its brokerage practices and internal controls.

== History ==
Degiro began as an institutional broker in 2008. The company was co-founded by Mark Fransen, Gijs Nagel, Niels Klok, Jasper Anderluh and Stephan Keetman.

In September 2013, Degiro launched its retail brokerage service for private investors in the Netherlands. In 2014 and 2015, the broker expanded into other European countries. In 2015, it launched its English-language platform in the United Kingdom.

On 22 September 2014, Euronext announced a partnership with Degiro for the distribution of retail services on Euronext markets. Euronext described the partnership as part of its plan to compete more effectively in the Dutch retail segment.

In December 2019, Flatex AG agreed to acquire Degiro B.V. for about €250 million, in a transaction intended to create one of Europe's largest online brokerages. In May 2021, Degiro B.V. was legally merged into Flatexdegiro Bank AG, with Degiro becoming the bank's Dutch branch.

After the acquisition, Degiro became part of the wider Flatexdegiro group, and later product launches were made within that group rather than by a separate Degiro B.V. In 2021, the group reported 2.06 million customer accounts, revenue of €418 million and 91 million settled transactions. In 2024, Flatexdegiro surpassed 3 million customer accounts and prepared to launch cryptocurrency trading. Subsequent group product launches included cryptocurrency trading and securities lending.

== Services ==
Degiro provides an online platform for retail investors to trade securities on international markets. At its 2015 UK launch, the platform offered trading in UK shares at a lower stated cost than several established UK platforms and gave retail clients access to major international stock markets.

After the 2021 merger, clients' uninvested cash was held with Flatexdegiro Bank and protected under Germany's statutory deposit guarantee scheme, up to the applicable limit.

== Corporate structure and regulation ==
Flatexdegiro Bank Dutch Branch, trading under the name Degiro, is the Dutch branch of Flatexdegiro Bank SE. Flatexdegiro Bank SE is primarily supervised by Germany's Federal Financial Supervisory Authority (BaFin). In the Netherlands, the Dutch branch is registered with De Nederlandsche Bank (DNB) and supervised by the Netherlands Authority for the Financial Markets (AFM) and DNB.

The Dutch branch has its own branch management, while Flatexdegiro Bank SE's board of directors is responsible for the bank's management and long-term strategy. The bank's supervisory board oversees the board of directors.

Degiro previously operated in the United Kingdom through European passporting and temporary permissions arrangements. The Financial Conduct Authority register lists Degiro B.V.'s status as cancelled since 18 July 2023. Degiro's UK website states that Flatexdegiro Bank SE is an overseas firm not authorised by the FCA and that UK investors are not protected by the Financial Services Compensation Scheme.

== Regulatory and legal issues ==
=== Governance ===
In April 2018, the AFM imposed an order subject to periodic penalty payments on Degiro B.V.. The decision was published in July 2020. The AFM found that Degiro had breached Dutch financial supervision law in areas including governance, compliance, conflicts of interest, fair treatment of clients and segregation of client assets. Degiro made changes, but the AFM found that several shortcomings had not been sufficiently remedied and required it to pay €300,000. The Rotterdam District Court later dismissed Degiro's appeal.

The AFM report also examined internal matching activity and risks involving an anonymised counterparty. Dutch financial press identified the counterparty as HiQ Market Neutral and described it as an entity connected to Degiro's founders and management. The AFM found that Degiro had treated the counterparty differently from retail clients in its risk framework and that the structure could have affected client assets in stress scenarios.

=== Order execution ===
In July 2023, the Appeals Committee of Kifid ruled that Degiro had not executed a consumer's orders as agreed and had provided incorrect information about the method of execution. The case concerned the use of Morgan Stanley's smart order router instead of direct-to-market execution on Euronext.

Kifid found that from February 2020 the consumer's orders were no longer executed directly on Euronext and that Degiro had not informed the consumer correctly and in time about the change. The Appeals Committee concluded that Degiro had misled the consumer about the actual course of events and ordered Degiro to compensate the consumer for losses, reasonable costs incurred to uncover the facts and the costs of the appeal procedure. The Dutch investors' association VEB subsequently asked Degiro for further information on whether other investors had been affected.

=== Payment for order flow ===
In 2021, Degiro's planned order-routing arrangement with Tradegate, a German trading venue, drew attention in the Netherlands because payment for order flow was not permitted under Dutch supervision but was legal in Germany at the time. The arrangement was also raised in a written question in the European Parliament, which described concerns over payment for order flow, best execution and an uneven playing field between member states.

Degiro stated that Tradegate allowed clients to trade outside regular exchange hours and that clients retained control over whether they sent orders to Tradegate. In 2024, the revised MiFIR introduced Article 39a, prohibiting investment firms from receiving fees, commissions or non-monetary benefits from third parties for executing or forwarding client orders to a particular venue. Member states in which the practice had previously been used could apply a temporary exemption until 30 June 2026.

=== Transaction reporting and anti-money laundering controls ===
In June 2022, the AFM disclosed that it had imposed a €2 million fine on Flatexdegiro Bank AG because Degiro had reported unusual transactions to the Dutch Financial Intelligence Unit too late or with incorrect transaction dates. The case concerned 36 reports made between mid-2019 and mid-2020, including 27 late reports and, after objection, three reports with an incorrect transaction date. After objection, court and appeal proceedings, the fine was ultimately set at €797,500 in 2025.

In January 2025, the AFM announced a separate fine for a transaction-reporting breach committed by Degiro in 2019. According to the AFM, Degiro had used an incorrect format for five weeks, which prevented the regulator from including more than two million transactions in its market-abuse supervision. The initial fine of €700,000 was reduced by the Rotterdam District Court to €85,000.

=== Stability of IT infrastructure ===
In December 2021, Tweakers, citing Het Financieele Dagblad, reported that DNB had imposed an additional capital requirement of more than €3 million on Degiro because of risks related to its IT platform.

=== Dividend withholding tax refund disputes ===
Degiro has been involved in Kifid disputes over whether it had to help clients reclaim foreign dividend withholding tax. In several French tax cases, Kifid ruled that Degiro had to assist when the requested administrative work was not excessive. In a Swedish tax case, Kifid ruled for Degiro because the refund procedure required information from third parties and was not a simple administrative task.

== Sponsorship ==
In 2022, Degiro became an official partner of Sevilla FC.

== See also ==
- List of electronic trading platforms
