= Lightspeed =

Lightspeed may refer to:

== Arts and literature ==
- Lightspeed (album), the 2010 album by Destine
- Lightspeed (film), a 2006 science fiction film
- Lightspeed (magazine), an online fantasy and science fiction magazine
- Lightspeed (Transformers), a fictional character
- Lightspeed (video game), a space simulation computer game released in 1990
- Julie Power, a Marvel Comics superhero who goes by the name Lightspeed
- "Lightspeed", a song by Dev from her album The Night the Sun Came Up

== Organizations ==
- Lightspeed (brokerage), a New York City based brokerage
- Lightspeed Systems, a company that sells content-control and security software and systems for schools
- Lightspeed Venture Partners, a venture capital firm
- Lightspeed Commerce, Canadian point-of-sale software provider

== Other uses ==
- the speed of light, a physical constant.
- LIGHT SPEED, the callsign of Executive Express Aviation
- Telesat Lightspeed, a low Earth orbit satellite constellation being built by Telesat
