= DBFX =

Deutsche Bank foreign exchange trading platform

dbFX
- Type: Private
- Industry: Financial services
- Founded: May 2006
- Defunct: May 17, 2011
- Headquarters: London, England
- Products: Foreign exchange
- Parent: Deutsche Bank
- Website: www.dbfx.com

dbFX was Deutsche Bank’s online margin foreign exchange trading platform and service for individual and institutional investors including financial institutions, hedge funds, corporations, asset managers, money managers, commodity trading advisors, broker-dealers, brokerage firms, high net worth individuals, and sophisticated and professional traders, which operated from 2006-2011.

In 2006, Deutsche Bank, then the world’s largest provider of foreign exchange trading by global market share, became the first global bulge bracket investment bank to offer institutional foreign exchange trading through an online margin FX trading platform.

The state of the art dbFX platform was a new and innovative technology at the time, which marked a paradigm shift from over-the-phone trading, to instantaneous online trade execution, at a reduced cost and risk, thus creating a de facto new asset class, and opening up, disrupting, and democratizing access to the global FX market.

On June 1, 2006, Euromoney, a leading institutional investor and international finance magazine, provided the context for the disruptive nature of Deutsche Bank’s dbFX platform.

“Deutsche Bank’s dbFX platform, formally announced on May 15, appears to herald a new phase. Deutsche’s move has got tongues wagging about which bank will be next. Gossip suggests it will be UBS. Direct access to the [FX] market has generally been over the phone.”

Three years later in 2009, Citibank, currently the world's largest provider of foreign exchange, initiated a competitive response to Deutsche Bank's dbFX platform called CitiFX Pro, thus becoming the second multinational bulge bracket investment bank to launch an online institutional foreign exchange service on a margin foreign exchange technology platform.

== History ==
Deutsche Bank was founded in 1870 as a specialist bank for foreign trade. In October 2001, Deutsche Bank listed its stock on the New York Stock Exchange, the first NYSE listing after the September 11 attacks. From 2002-2005, Deutsche Bank expanded rapidly through acquisitions of Rued Blass & Cie private bank, German Norisbank, Berliner Bank, and Deutsche Postbank, and Russian investment bank United Financial Group, achieving a target return on equity of 25%, and becoming one of the world's nine largest bulge bracket investment banks, and the world's largest foreign exchange provider.

By mid 2005, Deutsche Bank was in search of new and innovative ways to continue growing its global presence, and its market share of global foreign exchange trading, while meeting the increasing client demand for streamlined access to capital market products.

=== Launch ===
The idea for dbFX came from the executive management of one of Deutsche Bank's largest clients, FXCM, then the market leader in online margin FX trading, with a growing institutional footprint. A team led by Senior Managing Director Jayme Illien successfully proposed and structured a global strategic partnership with Deutsche Bank to establish and launch dbFX.

dbFX was initially launched with 10-20 countries with Illien as the founding global head of dbFX. He hand-picked, trained, and led a global cross-functional team across sales, trading, risk management, research, compliance, operations, and technology to launch and expand dbFX into 180+ countries, legal and regulatory jurisdictions, and nine languages.

dbFX offered the ability to trade on “one click” real time streaming executable quotes 24 hours a day at spreads as low as 1.5 pips on 34 currency pairs directly from the interbank market, the 1000 largest and most active foreign exchange banks in the world.

Deutsche Bank was the counterparty to all trades. All client funds were held at Deutsche Bank AG and protected by the Deposit Protection Fund of the Association of German Banks.

From 2006-2008, dbFX became the fastest growing business within Deutsche Bank, and a major contributor to Deutsche Bank's reign as the world's largest provider of foreign exchange trading from 2005-2013.

Many of the original dbFX team are now executive leaders at some of the world's leading financial institutions.

=== Closure ===
After the 2008 financial crisis, and the subsequent changing regulations of global financial markets, including the Dodd–Frank Wall Street Reform and Consumer Protection Act, and the Basel III capital and liquidity standards, Deutsche Bank discontinued dbFX, and a portion of dbFX business was acquired by GAIN Capital, a global provider of online trading.

Deutsche Bank released a statement about dbFX:

“dbFX volumes grew every year since 2006, culminating with 2010 volumes 56% higher than 2009. dbFX has been a strongly performing business for Deutsche Bank but has reached a point where in order to reach its full potential it requires significant investment in specific resources which are not consistent with Deutsche Bank’s current strategic initiatives.”

Speculation about why Deutsche Bank sold dbFX to Gain Capital has ranged, and included new global markets and financial regulations, lower corporate risk tolerance considering the bank's losses and exposure to the housing credit bubble and subprime and CDO market, Deutsche Bank management changes in response to the 2008 financial crisis, and issues regarding competitive threats to profitability with incumbent Deutsche Bank businesses.

== Services ==
dbFX provided clients with Deutsche Bank research, including economic analysis, foreign exchange reports, and daily market commentary. The platform supported charting-based order entry, API access, and automated trading systems. Clients could also allocate funds through Deutsche Bank's FX Select managed-account program and trade equities, equity derivatives, and commodities.

== Trading platform ==
The dbFX trading platform was provided under a global strategic partnership from FXCM and was available in nine languages including English, Chinese, Arabic, German, Spanish, French and Russian. Features included integrated charts, hedging with no FIFO restrictions, different order types, real-time account summary and 24-hour reporting.
