= Flatexdegiro =

German online brokerage and financial technology company

Flatexdegiro SE
- Company type: Public (Societas Europaea)
- Traded as: FWB: FTK; MDAX component
- ISIN: DE000FTG1111
- Industry: Online brokerage; Financial technology; Banking
- Founded: 1999
- Founder: Bernd Förtsch
- Headquarters: Frankfurt am Main, Germany
- Area served: Europe
- Key people: Oliver Behrens (CEO); Benon Janos (CFO)
- Products: Electronic trading platforms; Brokerage services; Securities lending; Cryptocurrency trading
- Revenue: ▲€559.8 million (2025)
- Net income: ▲€160.4 million (2025)
- Number of employees: 1,210 (2025 average)
- Website: flatexdegiro.com

Flatexdegiro SE (stylised as flatexDEGIRO SE) is a German listed online brokerage and financial technology company based in Frankfurt am Main. The company operates the Flatex, Degiro and ViTrade brokerage platforms through Flatexdegiro Bank. It is one of Europe's largest retail online brokers, serving more than 3 million customer accounts by late 2024.

The company's origins go back to PRE.IPO AG, founded in 1999. Its Flatex online brokerage platform was launched in 2006. In 2015, the company acquired a majority stake in XCOM AG. In 2019, Flatex AG agreed to acquire the Dutch online broker Degiro B.V., and the legal merger of Degiro B.V. into Flatexdegiro Bank AG was completed in 2021.

In 2025, Flatexdegiro reported revenue of €559.8 million and net income of €160.4 million. The company has faced regulatory sanctions in Germany, Austria and the Netherlands, including measures by the BaFin in 2023, advertising-related fines in 2024 and 2025, and a €1 million BaFin fine in 2026 for a market abuse disclosure breach.

== History ==
The predecessor of Flatexdegiro was founded in 1999 as PRE.IPO AG by Bernd Förtsch. The company launched the Flatex online brokerage platform in 2006. The name "Flatex" is derived from "flat" and "execution", reflecting the flat-fee model used by the broker for securities transactions.

In 2014, Flatex AG was renamed FinTech Group AG. In 2019, FinTech Group AG was renamed back to Flatex AG.

In March 2015, FinTech Group acquired a majority stake in XCOM AG, a German software and systems provider.

In December 2019, Flatex AG agreed to acquire the Dutch online broker Degiro B.V. for about €250 million, in a transaction intended to create one of Europe's largest online brokerages. The legal merger of Degiro B.V. into Flatexdegiro Bank AG was completed in May 2021, with Degiro becoming the bank's Dutch branch.

The acquisition significantly increased the group's scale. In 2021, Flatexdegiro had 2.06 million customer accounts, revenue of €418 million and 91 million settled transactions.

In 2024, CEO Frank Niehage resigned amid a public dispute with founder and major shareholder Bernd Förtsch, who criticised the company's management for strategic mistakes, including missing the cryptocurrency boom. Oliver Behrens, formerly CEO of Morgan Stanley Europe, became CEO on 1 October 2024. In 2025, Hans-Hermann Lotter became chairman of the supervisory board, while Förtsch was re-elected as a member.

In November 2024, Flatexdegiro surpassed 3 million customer accounts and prepared to launch cryptocurrency trading. The company had more than tripled its customer base since 2020 and held customer assets of €66 billion. In January 2025, Flatexdegiro launched crypto trading with infrastructure supplied by Wyden, Tradias and Tangany.

In October 2025, Flatexdegiro launched a securities lending service in partnership with Sharegain. The service was initially launched for customers in the Netherlands and Spain, with a wider European rollout planned.

At the end of 2025, Flatexdegiro changed its legal form from a German stock corporation (Aktiengesellschaft, AG) to a European Company (Societas Europaea, SE).

== Corporate structure ==
Flatexdegiro SE is the parent company of Flatexdegiro Bank SE, through which the group's brokerage and banking activities are conducted. The group operates three brokerage platforms: Flatex, which primarily serves Germany and Austria; Degiro, which serves international European markets; and ViTrade, which targets active traders.

Flatexdegiro is listed on the Frankfurt Stock Exchange and joined the MDAX on 24 March 2025.

== Financials ==
Flatexdegiro's revenue increased from €390.7 million in 2023 to €480.0 million in 2024 and €559.8 million in 2025, while net income rose from €71.9 million to €160.4 million over the same period.

For 2025, the company announced a dividend policy targeting a payout of 20% of consolidated net income, corresponding to about €0.30 per share.

== Regulatory issues ==
In June 2022, the AFM disclosed that it had imposed a €2 million fine on Flatexdegiro Bank AG because Degiro had reported unusual transactions to the Dutch Financial Intelligence Unit too late or with incorrect transaction dates. Degiro made 36 reports between mid-2019 and mid-2020, including 27 late reports and, as initially assessed, 10 reports with an incorrect transaction date. After objection, court and appeal proceedings, the fine was ultimately set at €797,500 in 2025.

In February 2023, BaFin imposed a €1.05 million fine on Flatexdegiro Bank AG for breaches of banking supervisory rules. The regulator also ordered the bank and the Flatexdegiro financial holding group to meet additional own-funds requirements and appointed a special representative to monitor the implementation of remedial measures.

In August 2024, the Austrian Financial Market Authority imposed an additional fine of €22,480 on Flatexdegiro Bank AG for breaches of rules requiring clear and non-misleading information in marketing communications on its websites.

In December 2025, BaFin imposed two administrative fines totalling €560,000 on Flatexdegiro Bank AG for breaches of the German Securities Trading Act. The bank had advertised free investment services on two websites in early 2022 without clearly indicating that a regular processing fee would apply.

In April 2026, BaFin imposed an administrative fine of €1 million on Flatexdegiro SE for a breach of market abuse disclosure obligations. The regulator said a special audit had found that the company had failed to publish inside information promptly through an ad hoc announcement and had instead disclosed it later in a regular press release.

== See also ==
- List of banks in Germany
