= John Liu (disambiguation) =

John Liu may refer to:

- John Liu (born 1967), member of the New York State Senate’s 11th district
- John Liu Shi-gong (1928–2017), Chinese Roman Catholic bishop
- John Baptist Liu Jingshan (1913–2013), Chinese Roman Catholic bishop
- John Liu (actor), Taiwanese martial artist/actor, who appeared in various Chinese and Korean films in the 1970s through 1990s
- John C. Liu, founder of Firstrade Securities
- John D. Liu, film maker and ecologist
