= Quadriserv =

Quadriserv was a US-based electronic trading platform that helped clients lend and borrow stock for settlement of short sales and other purposes. It was headquartered in New York and was the holding company for its subsidiary, Automated Equity Finance Markets (AQS).

In August 2016, AQS was acquired by Equilend.

QS Holdco sued Equilend and other prime brokers arguing they colluded to drive out AQS. In August 2019, the case was dismissed on the basis that Equilend, in the acquisition, had acquired all rights to take legal action on behalf of AQS. QS Holdco's attempt to amend the complaint was denied, in full, in August 2020.

== History ==
Quadriserv was founded in September 2001. Joseph Weinhoffer was the company's co-founder and served as its CEO between 2007 and 2009.

Quadriserv's wholly owned subsidiary Automated Equity Finance Markets, Inc. operates what it regards as the world's largest central counterparty based lending market.

In 2009, it entered into an alliance with Direct Edge. In 2010, it integrated AQS with SunGard's Loanet Smart Loan.

== Management ==
Joseph Weinhoffer is the company's co-founder and was its CEO in 2007. Tom Perna was the company's CEO in 2009, and Bruce C. Turner, a former Nasdaq and CIBC World Markets trading executive, was the company's president and COO in 2011.
