= PC1 =

PC1 may refer to:

- Furin, an enzyme
- Proprotein convertase 1, an enzyme
- Polycystin 1, a protein in humans associated with autosomal dominant polycystic kidney disease
- PC-1, a submarine telecommunications cable system (Pacific Crossing 1)
- PC1 cipher, used by the Amazon Kindle and some boot loaders
- First principal component in principal component analysis, often used in genetic distance visualizations
