= History of gold =

Gold is a chemical element; its chemical symbol is 'Au' (from Latin aurum) and atomic number 79. In its pure form, it is a bright-metallic-yellow, dense, soft, malleable, and ductile metal.

75% of the presently accounted for gold has been extracted since 1910, two-thirds since 1950.

== Overview ==
=== Earliest recordings ===
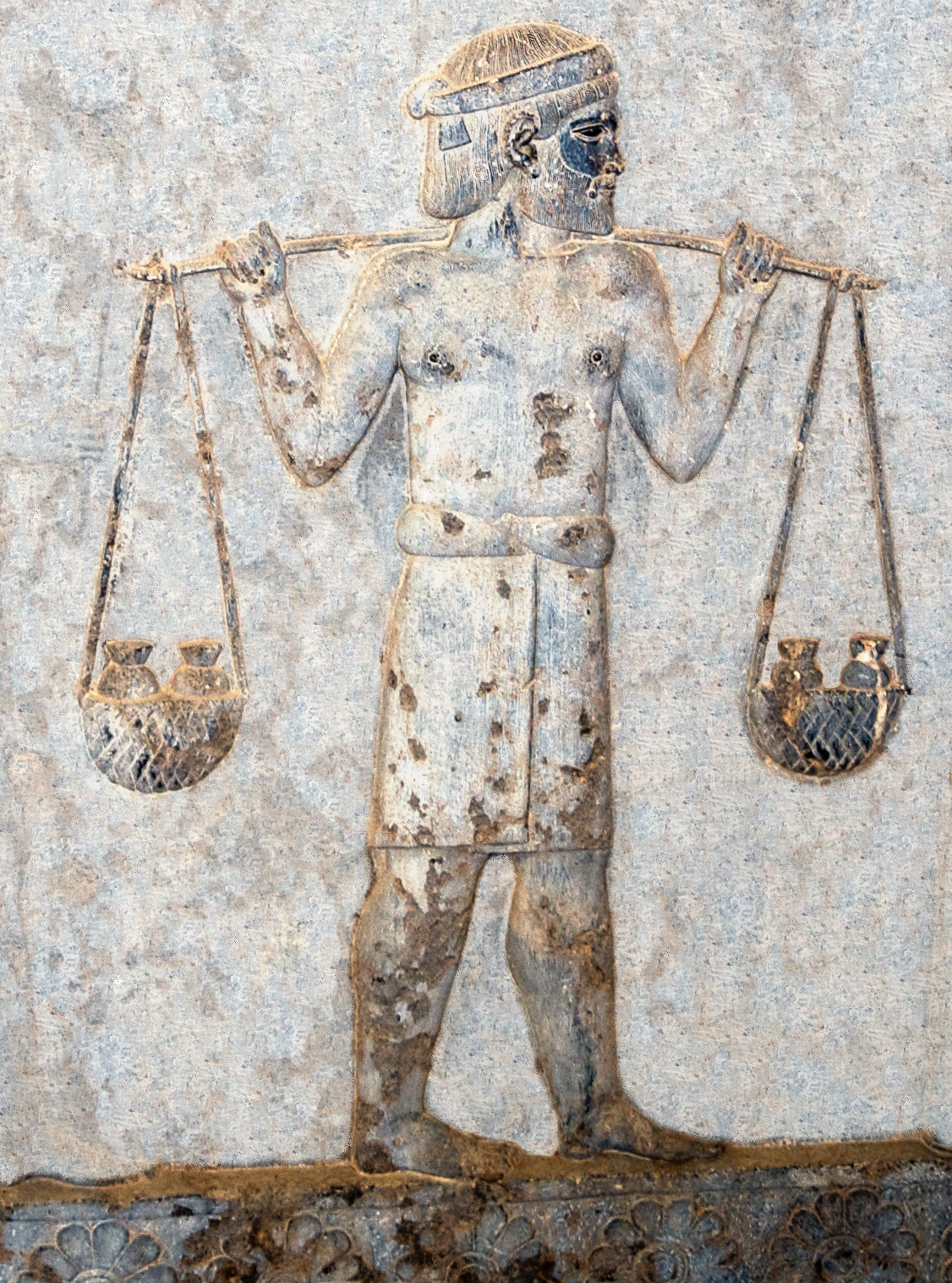
An Indian tribute-bearer at Apadana, from the Achaemenid satrapy of Hindush, carrying gold on a yoke, circa 500 BC.

The earliest recorded metal employed by humans appears to be gold, which can be found free or "native". Small amounts of natural gold have been found in Spanish caves used during the late Paleolithic period, c. 40,000 BC.

The oldest gold artifacts in the world are from Bulgaria and are dating back to the 5th millennium BC (4,600 BC to 4,200 BC), such as those found in the Varna Necropolis near Lake Varna and the Black Sea coast, thought to be the earliest "well-dated" finding of gold artifacts in history.

Gold artifacts probably made their first appearance in Ancient Egypt at the very beginning of the pre-dynastic period, at the end of the fifth millennium BC and the start of the fourth, and smelting was developed during the course of the 4th millennium; gold artifacts appear in the archeology of Lower Mesopotamia during the early 4th millennium. As of 1990, gold artifacts found at the Wadi Qana cave cemetery of the 4th millennium BC in West Bank were the earliest from the Levant. Gold artifacts such as the golden hats and the Nebra disk appeared in Central Europe from the 2nd millennium BC Bronze Age.

The oldest known map of a gold mine was drawn in the 19th Dynasty of Ancient Egypt (1320–1200 BC), whereas the first written reference to gold was recorded in the 12th Dynasty around 1900 BC. Egyptian hieroglyphs from as early as 2600 BC describe gold, which King Tushratta of the Mitanni claimed was "more plentiful than dirt" in Egypt. Egypt and especially Nubia had the resources to make them major gold-producing areas for much of history. One of the earliest known maps, known as the Turin Papyrus Map, shows the plan of a gold mine in Nubia together with indications of the local geology. The primitive working methods are described by both Strabo and Diodorus Siculus, and included fire-setting. Large mines were also present across the Red Sea in what is now Saudi Arabia.

Gold is mentioned in the Amarna letters numbered 19 and 26 from around the 14th century BC.

Gold is mentioned frequently in the Old Testament, starting with Genesis 2:11 (at Havilah), the story of the golden calf, and many parts of the temple including the Menorah and the golden altar. In the New Testament, it is included with the gifts of the magi in the first chapters of Matthew. The Book of Revelation 21:21 describes the city of New Jerusalem as having streets "made of pure gold, clear as crystal". An ancient Talmudic text circa 100 AD describes Rachel, wife of Rabbi Akiva, receiving a "Jerusalem of Gold" (diadem).

=== Classical Antiquity ===
Exploitation of gold in the south-east corner of the Black Sea is said to date from the time of Midas, and this gold was important in the establishment of what is probably the world's earliest coinage in Lydia around 610 BC. The legend of the Golden Fleece dating from eighth century BC may refer to the use of fleeces to trap gold dust from placer deposits in the ancient world. From the 6th or 5th century BC, the Chu (state) circulated the Ying Yuan, one kind of square gold coin.

In Roman metallurgy, new methods for extracting gold on a large scale were developed by introducing hydraulic mining methods, especially in Hispania from 25 BC onwards and in Dacia from 106 AD onwards. One of their largest mines was at Las Medulas in León, where seven long aqueducts enabled them to sluice most of a large alluvial deposit. The mines at Roşia Montană in Transylvania were also very large, and until very recently, still mined by opencast methods. They also exploited smaller deposits in Britain, such as placer and hard-rock deposits at Dolaucothi. The various methods they used are well described by Pliny the Elder in his encyclopedia Naturalis Historia written towards the end of the first century AD.

A Greek burial crown made of gold was found in a grave circa 370 BC.

=== Middle Ages ===
During Mansa Musa's (ruler of the Mali Empire from 1312 to 1337) hajj to Mecca in 1324, he passed through Cairo in July 1324, and was reportedly accompanied by a camel train that included thousands of people and nearly a hundred camels where he gave away so much gold that it depressed the price in Egypt for over a decade, causing high inflation. A contemporary Arab historian remarked:

Gold was at a high price in Egypt until they came in that year. The mithqal did not go below 25 dirhams and was generally above, but from that time its value fell and it cheapened in price and has remained cheap till now. The mithqal does not exceed 22 dirhams or less. This has been the state of affairs for about twelve years until this day by reason of the large amount of gold which they brought into Egypt and spent there [...].

— Chihab Al-Umari, Kingdom of Mali

The Dome of the Rock is covered with an ultra-thin golden glassier. The Sikh Golden temple, the Harmandir Sahib, is a building covered with gold. Similarly the Wat Phra Kaew emerald Buddhist temple (wat) in Thailand has ornamental gold-leafed statues and roofs

One main goal of the alchemists was to produce gold from other substances, such as lead — presumably by the interaction with a mythical substance called the philosopher's stone. Trying to produce gold led the alchemists to systematically find out what can be done with substances, and this laid the foundation for today's chemistry, which can produce gold (albeit uneconomically) by using nuclear transmutation. Their symbol for gold was the circle with a point at its center (☉), which was also the astrological symbol and the ancient Chinese character for the Sun.

=== In the Americas ===
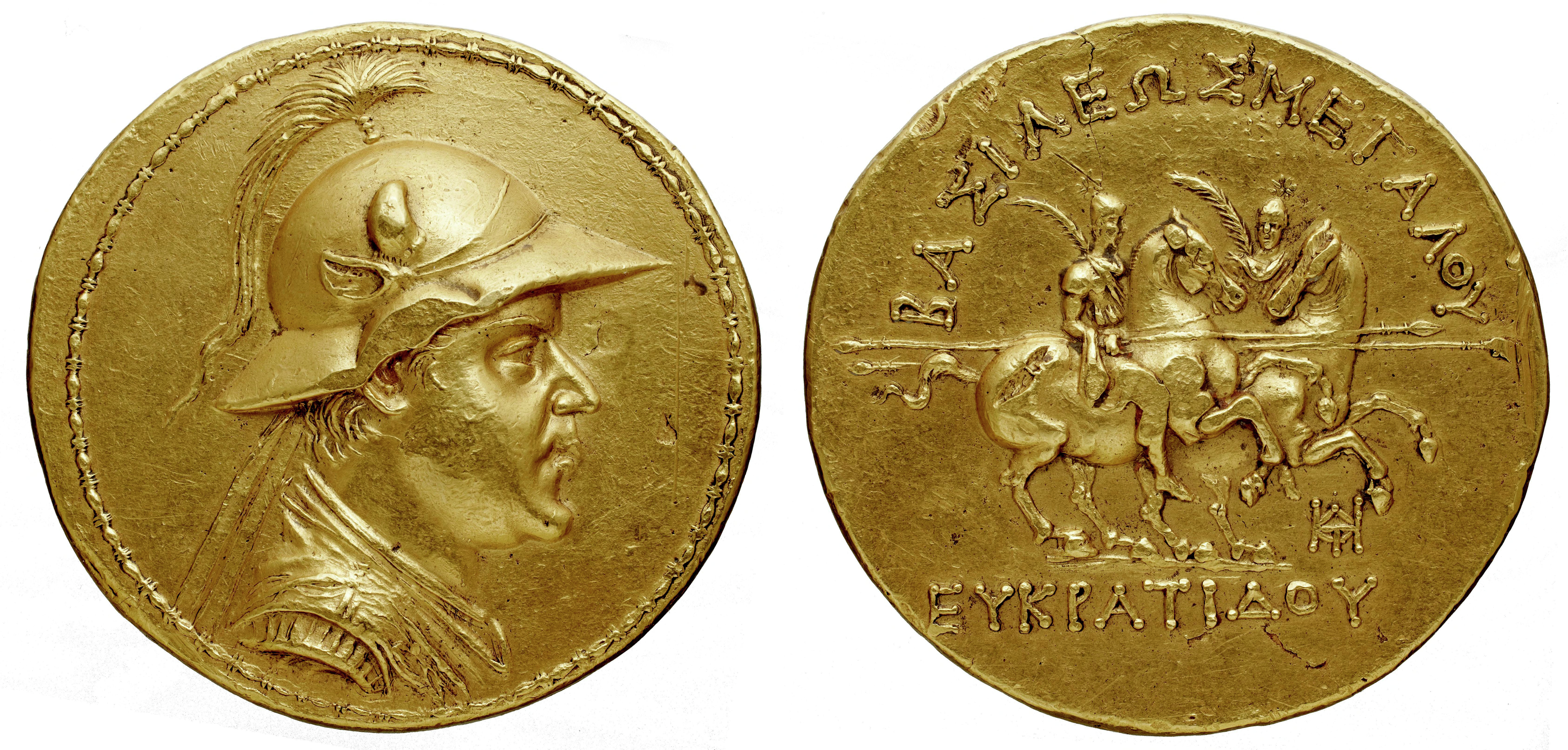
Gold coin of Eucratides I (171–145 BC), one of the Hellenistic rulers of ancient Ai-Khanoum. This is the largest known gold coin minted in antiquity (169.2 g (5.97 oz); 58 mm (2.3 in)).

The European exploration of the Americas was fueled in no small part by reports of the gold ornaments displayed in great profusion by Native American peoples, especially in Mesoamerica, Peru, Ecuador and Colombia. The Aztecs regarded gold as the product of the gods, calling it literally "god excrement" (teocuitlatl in Nahuatl), and after Moctezuma II was killed, most of this gold was shipped to Spain. However, for the indigenous peoples of North America gold was considered useless and they saw much greater value in other minerals which were directly related to their utility, such as obsidian, flint, and slate.

El Dorado is applied to a legendary story in which precious stones were found in fabulous abundance along with gold coins. The concept of El Dorado underwent several transformations, and eventually accounts of the previous myth were also combined with those of a legendary lost city. El Dorado, was the term used by the Spanish Empire to describe a mythical tribal chief (zipa) of the Muisca native people in Colombia, who, as an initiation rite, covered himself with gold dust and submerged in Lake Guatavita. The legends surrounding El Dorado changed over time, as it went from being a man, to a city, to a kingdom, and then finally to an empire.

The exploitation of gold in Colonial Brazil began at the end of the 17th century, especially in the region of Minas Gerais, and brought about profound economic, social, and administrative transformations. According to estimates by historians, between 800 and 1,000 tons of gold were extracted during the 18th and early 19th centuries. Gold mining attracted a large population flow, encouraged the occupation of the interior, and led to the emergence of towns and cities, sustained by enslaved labor, while also prompting the Portuguese Crown to strengthen oversight and tax collection, such as the quinto.

=== European colonization of Africa ===
Beginning in the early modern period, European exploration and colonization of West Africa was driven in large part by reports of gold deposits in the region, which was eventually referred to by Europeans as the "Gold Coast". From the late 15th to early 19th centuries, European trade in the region was primarily focused in gold, along with ivory and slaves. The gold trade in West Africa was dominated by the Ashanti Empire, who initially traded with the Portuguese before branching out and trading with British, French, Spanish and Danish merchants. British desires to secure control of West African gold deposits played a role in the Anglo-Ashanti wars of the late 19th century, which saw the Ashanti Empire annexed by Britain.

== Culture ==
In popular culture gold is a high standard of excellence, often used in awards. Great achievements are frequently rewarded with gold, in the form of gold medals, gold trophies and other decorations. Winners of athletic events and other graded competitions are usually awarded a gold medal. Many awards such as the Nobel Prize are made from gold as well. Other award statues and prizes are depicted in gold or are gold plated (such as the Academy Awards, the Golden Globe Awards, the Emmy Awards, the Palme d'Or, and the British Academy Film Awards). The top prize at the Olympic Games and many other sports competitions is the gold medal.

Aristotle in his ethics used gold symbolism when referring to what is now known as the golden mean. Similarly, gold is associated with perfect or divine principles, such as in the case of the golden ratio and the Golden Rule. Gold is further associated with the wisdom of aging and fruition. The fiftieth wedding anniversary is golden. A person's most valued or most successful latter years are sometimes considered "golden years" or "golden jubilee". The height of a civilization is referred to as a golden age.

Gold played a role in western culture, as a cause for desire and of corruption, as told in children's fables such as Rumpelstiltskin—where Rumpelstiltskin turns hay into gold for the peasant's daughter in return for her child when she becomes a princess—and the stealing of the hen that lays golden eggs in Jack and the Beanstalk.

== Price ==
Historically gold coinage was widely used as currency; when paper money was introduced, it typically was a receipt redeemable for gold coin or bullion. In a monetary system known as the gold standard, a certain weight of gold was given the name of a unit of currency. For a long period, the United States government set the value of the US dollar so that one troy ounce was equal to $20.67 ($0.665 per gram, equivalent to $16 in 2025), but in 1934 the dollar was devalued to $35.00 per troy ounce ($0.889/g, equivalent to $21 in 2025). By 1961, it was becoming hard to maintain this price, and a pool of US and European banks agreed to manipulate the market to prevent further currency devaluation against increased gold demand.

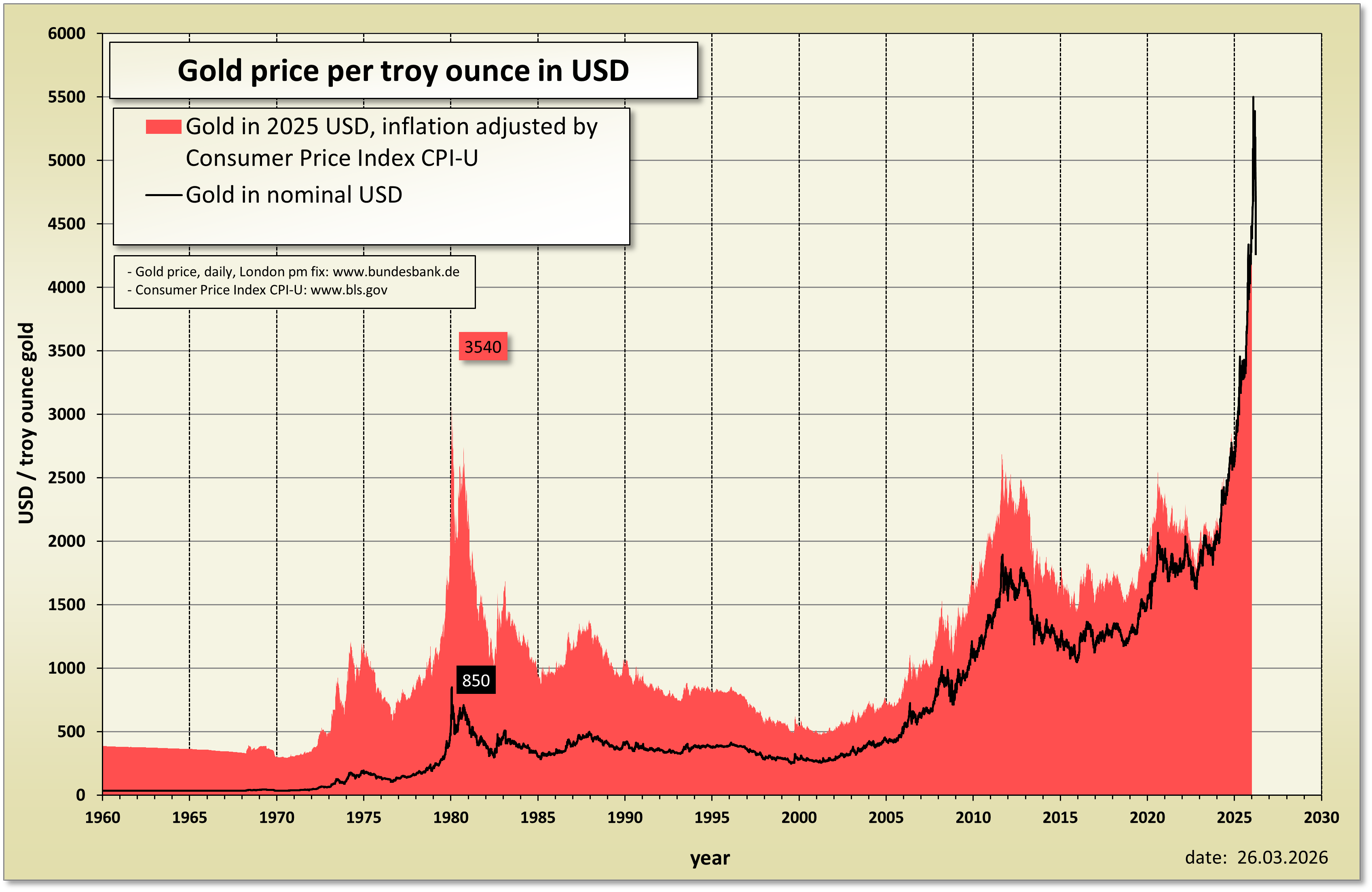
1960–2025 historical gold price in US dollars and inflation adjusted gold price in US dollars

The largest gold depository in the world is that of the U.S. Federal Reserve Bank in New York, which holds about 3% of the gold known to exist and accounted for today, as does the similarly laden U.S. Bullion Depository at Fort Knox. In 2005 the World Gold Council estimated total global gold supply to be 3,859 tonnes and demand to be 3,754 tonnes, giving a surplus of 105 tonnes.

After the 15 August 1971 Nixon shock, the price began to greatly increase, and between 1968 and 2000 the price of gold ranged widely, from a high of $850 per troy ounce ($27.33/g, equivalent to $107 in 2025) on 21 January 1980, to a low of $252.90 per troy ounce ($8.13/g, equivalent to $16 in 2025) on 21 June 1999 (London Gold Fixing). Prices increased rapidly from 2001, but the 1980 high was not exceeded until 3 January 2008, when a new maximum of $865.35 per troy ounce was set (equivalent to $1,294 in 2025). Another record price was set on 17 March 2008, at $1023.50 per troy ounce ($32.91/g, equivalent to $49 in 2025).

On 2 December 2009, gold reached a new high closing at $1,217.23 (equivalent to $1,827 in 2025). Gold further rallied hitting new highs in May 2010 after the European Union debt crisis prompted further purchase of gold as a safe asset. On 1 March 2011, gold hit a new all-time high of $1432.57 (equivalent to $2,050 in 2025), based on investor concerns regarding ongoing unrest in North Africa as well as in the Middle East.

From April 2001 to August 2011, spot gold prices more than quintupled in value against the US dollar, hitting yet another new all-time high of $1,913.50 on 23 August 2011 (equivalent to $2,739 in 2025), prompting speculation that the long secular declining market had ended and a growing market had returned. However, the price then began a slow decline towards $1,200 per troy ounce in late 2014 and 2015 (equivalent to $1,632 in 2025).

In August 2020, the gold price picked up to US$2,060 per ounce (equivalent to $2,563 in 2025) after a total growth of 59% from August 2018 to October 2020, a period during which it outplaced the Nasdaq total return of 54%.

Gold futures are traded on the COMEX exchange. These contacts are priced in USD per troy ounce (1 troy ounce = 31.1034768 grams). Below are the CQG contract specifications outlining the futures contracts:

Contract Specifications
Gold (GCA)	
Exchange:	COMEX
Sector:	Metal
Tick Size:	0.1
Tick Value:	10 USD
BPV:	100
Denomination:	USD
Decimal Place:	1

== Religion ==
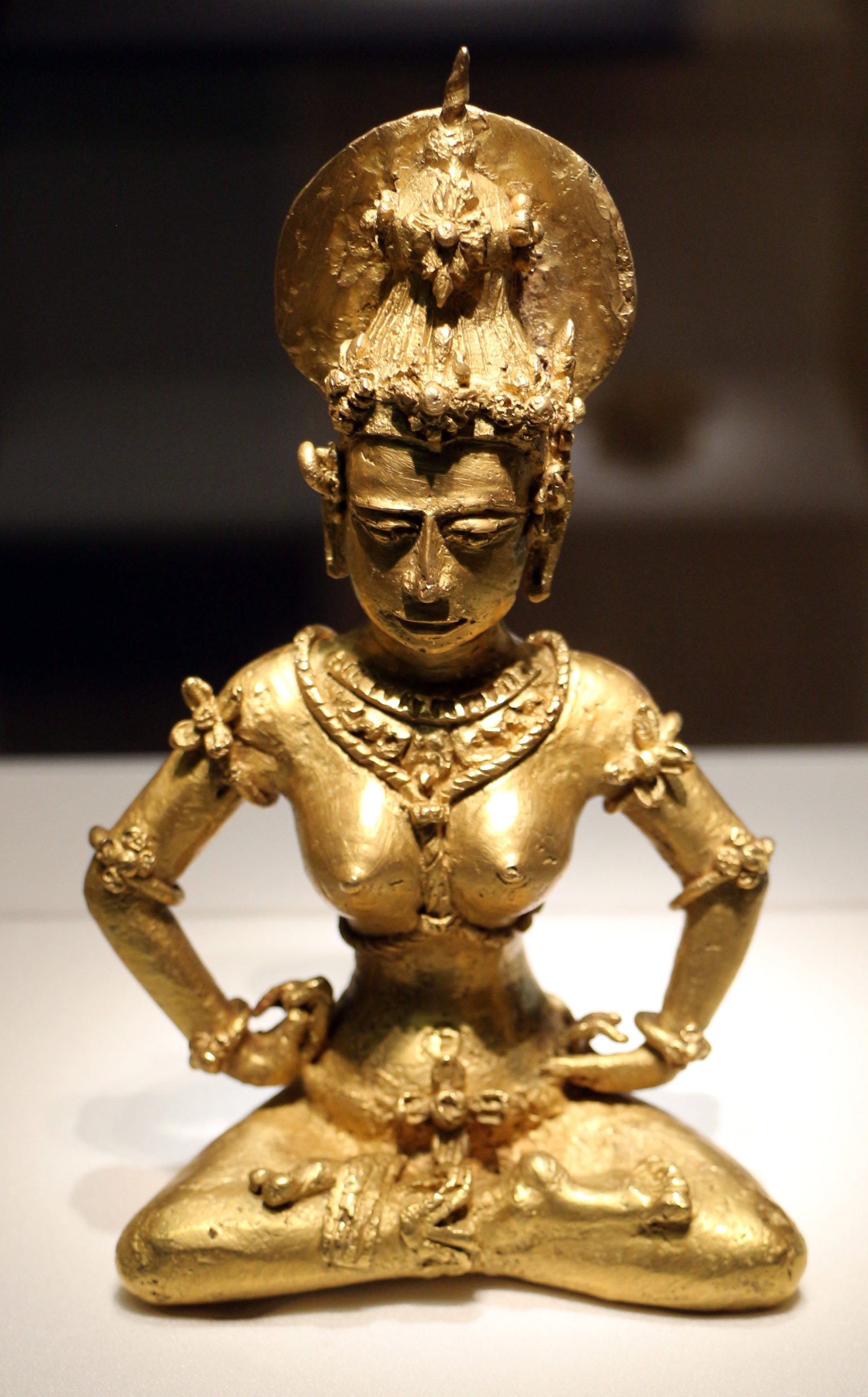
The Agusan image, depicting a deity from northeast Mindanao

The first known prehistoric human usages of gold were religious in nature.

In some forms of Christianity and Judaism, gold has been associated both with the sacred and evil. In the Book of Exodus, the Golden Calf is a symbol of idolatry, while in the Book of Genesis, Abraham was said to be rich in gold and silver, and Moses was instructed to cover the Mercy Seat of the Ark of the Covenant with pure gold. In Byzantine iconography the halos of Christ, Virgin Mary and the saints are often golden.

In Islam, gold (along with silk) is often cited as being forbidden for men to wear. Abu Bakr al-Jazaeri, quoting a hadith, said that "[t]he wearing of silk and gold are forbidden on the males of my nation, and they are lawful to their women". This, however, has not been enforced consistently throughout history, e.g. in the Ottoman Empire. Further, small gold accents on clothing, such as in embroidery, may be permitted.

In ancient Greek religion and mythology, Theia was seen as the goddess of gold, silver and other gemstones.

According to Christopher Columbus, those who had something of gold were in possession of something of great value on Earth and a substance to even help souls to paradise.

Wedding rings are typically made of gold. It is long lasting and unaffected by the passage of time and may aid in the ring symbolism of eternal vows before God and the perfection the marriage signifies. In Orthodox Christian wedding ceremonies, the wedded couple is adorned with a golden crown (though some opt for wreaths, instead) during the ceremony, an amalgamation of symbolic rites.

On 24 August 2020, Israeli archaeologists discovered a trove of early Islamic gold coins near the central city of Yavne. Analysis of the extremely rare collection of 425 gold coins indicated that they were from the late 9th century. Dating to around 1,100 years back, the gold coins were from the Abbasid Caliphate.
