= Finspreads =

- Industry: Financial services
- Founded: 1999
- Headquarters: London, United Kingdom
- Services: Financial Spread Betting
- Parent: City Index Group (2005–present)
- Website: www.finspreads.com

Finspreads is a London-based online financial spread betting firm that offers customers access to various instruments on the world's financial markets through online and mobile trading platforms. Along with IFX Markets, FX Solutions and City Index Limited, it is a trading name of City Index Group.

== Background ==
Finspreads first offered interactive online spread betting in 1999, before the company was acquired by the City Index Group.

== Trading platform ==
Finspreads has stated that its goal is to "make spread betting as straightforward as possible for every trader, whatever their level of experience".

The company also offers an eight-week training program, the Finspreads Trading Academy Course to help customers better understand spread betting.

Spread betting iPhone app - In 2010 Finspreads developed an iPhone app.
