= Wedbush Securities =

American investment firm

Coordinates: 40.04294°N 75.36577°W

- Type: Private
- Industry: Financial services
- Founded: 1955; 71 years ago Los Angeles, California
- Founders: Edward W. Wedbush; Robert Werner
- Headquarters: 225 S Lake Ave PH, Pasadena, CA 91101
- Key people: Gary L. Wedbush (President)
- AUM: US$6.7 billion (2026)
- Number of employees: 980 (2026)
- Website: wedbush.com

Wedbush Securities Inc. is a privately held financial services firm based in Los Angeles. As of October 2026, the firm had $6.7 billion under management with 10,833 clients.

Wedbush operates three divisions: Wealth Management, Investment Banking & Capital Markets, and Clearing & Execution.

== History ==
The firm was founded in 1955 by two high school friends, Edward W. Wedbush, and Robert Werner, in Los Angeles, California. They each contributed $5,000 to capitalize their new company, Wedbush & Company. The company was named after Wedbush because neither partner wanted a possible business failure named after them and Wedbush lost a coin toss.

Wedbush opened its first office in 1957 located in the Crenshaw district of Los Angeles. Three years later, Robert Werner decided to sell his interest in the firm to Ed Wedbush. In 1972, the firm began offering correspondent clearing services, providing trade execution for other brokerage firms.

On September 30, 2024, Wedbush unveiled their new Pasadena headquarters, replacing their Los Angeles headquarters, which the company expects to officially move into in 2025.

== Partnerships and Investments ==
In 2011, Wedbush acquired Lime Brokerage, with the goal of integrating Lime's "high-performance trading technologies" with Wedbush's Advanced Clearing Services.

In 2018, Wedbush acquired Lightspeed, an American electronic trading platform. In the transaction, Lightspeed merged with Lime Brokerage, LLC, an agency brokerage owned by Wedbush.

In 2023, Wedbush entered into a partnership with Maybank, Malaysia’s largest bank by market capitalization and total assets (at the time), which enables Wedbush clients to trade in Southeast Asian markets and granting access to Maybank’s research and market insights. Also in 2023, Wedbush became the largest shareholder of Velocity Trade, a Toronto-based global broker-dealer.

In July 2024, Wedbush entered into a "strategic alliance" with Hana Securities wherein Wedbush's investment banking division's reach will expand to South Korea and Wedbush clients will have access to Hana's research and market insights.

== Regulatory actions ==
In 2018, FINRA fined Wedbush $1.5 million for violating the SEC's Customer Protection and Net Capital Rules, and for related supervisory, books, and records failures. FINRA found that, during a five month period from 2015 through 2016, Wedbush was net capital deficient, ranging between $10.5 million and $59.4 million. Between 2011 and 2016, FINRA found that Wedbush failed to accurately calculate its customer reserve requirement on numerous occasions, leading to underfunding of its reserve account on many of these occasions. FINRA also found that Wedbush had failed to "establish and maintain supervisory systems and procedures reasonably designed to ensure compliance with the Customer Protection and Net Capital Rules, which exposed customer funds and securities to risk and prevented the firm from detecting the deficiencies for nearly seven years." Wedbush settled this matter with FINRA with a no-admit/no-deny.

In 2023, Wedbush and FINRA entered into a settlement agreement with Wedbush paying a $350,000 fine relating to a 2021 matter where Wedbush allegedly approved four wire request transfers, totaling $6.6 million, submitted by a hacker without taking reasonable steps to confirm the requests' authenticity.

In 2024, Wedbush agreed to pay $425,000 in a settlement agreement with FINRA in relation to activities between 2009 and 2022. FINRA alleged that Wedbush published inaccurate and incomplete reports on various securities, or failed to publish reports in a timely manner.
