= NinjaTrader =

US financial technology company

- Company type: Private
- Industry: Financial technology, futures trading, brokerage
- Founded: 2003
- Founder: Raymond Deux
- Headquarters: Chicago, Illinois, United States
- Key people: Martin Franchi (CEO)
- Services: Futures trading platform, clearing and brokerage
- Parent: Kraken (2025–present)
- Website: ninjatrader.com

NinjaTrader is a financial technology company headquartered in Chicago, Illinois. The company specializes in futures trading software, along with clearing and brokerage services.

== History ==
NinjaTrader was founded in 2003 by Raymond Deux.

In 2005, it introduced NinjaScript, an open trading development framework written in C#.

In 2014, as part of NinjaTrader's acquisition of Mirus Futures, Martin (Marty) Franchi became CFO of NinjaTrader, transitioning to COO in 2017 and CEO in 2018. Following the Mirus Futures acquisition, NinjaTrader established its own clearing and brokerage service, enabling the firm to operate as a futures commission merchant (FCM).

In 2019, CME Group introduced Micro futures, which NinjaTrader added to its contract offerings. From 2020 – 2021, the company acquired TransAct Futures, Infinity Futures, and Tradovate.

NinjaTrader's platform was named Best Trading Software from Technical Analysis of Stocks & Commodities (TASC) Readers’ Choice Award in 2024, 2023, 2022, and 2021.

On May 2, 2025, Kraken, a U.S.-based cryptocurrency exchange, acquired NinjaTrader for $1.5 billion.

== Overview ==
NinjaTrader is a multiplatform futures trading software available on desktop, web, and mobile, supporting both live and simulated trading. It offers real-time market data, customizable charts and strategies, third-party add-ons, and educational resources. In February 2025, NinjaTrader introduced the NinjaTrader Arena, a free futures trading competition that allows retail traders to compete against one another in a simulated trading environment for the chance to earn cash prizes.

In March 2025, NinjaTrader relaunched its daily livestream, NinjaTrader Live.

== Licensing and regulation ==
NinjaTrader is registered with the Commodity Futures Trading Commission (CFTC) as an Introducing Broker and is a member of the National Futures Association (NFA). It offers brokerage services through NinjaTrader Clearing, LLC d/b/a NinjaTrader, Tradovate, and Kraken Derivatives US, a registered futures commission merchant (FCM).

== See also ==
- List of electronic trading platforms
