= Stake (platform) =

Financial services company (e. 2017)

Stakeshop Pty Ltd
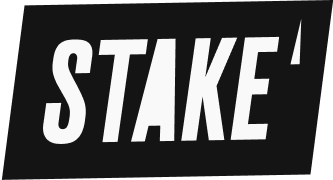
- Logo since September 2021
- Type: Privately held company
- Industry: Financial services
- Founded: January 8, 2016; 10 years ago in Sydney, Australia
- Founder: Matt Leibowitz; Dan Silver
- Headquarters: Sydney, Australia
- Area served: Australia; New Zealand
- Key people: Matt Leibowitz (CEO); Geoff Lloyd (Chairman)
- Services: Online brokerage
- Number of employees: 136 (2025)
- Website: https://hellostake.com/

Stake (Stakeshop Pty Ltd) is an online investing platform launched in 2017 in Sydney, Australia. Stake offers Australian customers brokerage services for U.S. and ASX-listed equities, along with an income fund and SMSF administration. In New Zealand, Stake provides accounts access to Wall Street investments. As of 2022, Stake has over 54,000 accounts.

== History ==
In 2016, Stake was founded by Matt Leibowitz (ex‑Optiver) and Dan Silver in Sydney. The Stake online brokerage platform was launched in August 2017.

The company raised approximately A$3.5m in 2019, A$40m in 2021 and A$50m in early 2022 from investors including Tiger Global Management and DST Global. By then, Stake had over A$2b in assets under management.

In January 2021, during the GameStop short squeeze, Stake experienced service outages that resulted in delayed fund transfers and cancelled open market orders. Soon after this, DriveWealth, Stake’s broker-dealer for U.S. equities, significantly raised its capital requirements for buying $GME, forcing Stake to halt trading in Gamestop. This drew criticism online, in part due to DriveWealth's payment for order flow practices. Stake denied taking part in PFOF routing in a subsequently deleted blog post. Later that year, Stake introduced CHESS-sponsored ASX trading.

In September 2026, Stake disclosed that some of its customers’ personal information had been affected by a data security incident at DriveWealth. According to Stake, information potentially affected included customers’ names, email addresses, telephone numbers and postal addresses, tax status and country of taxation, account numbers, and snapshots of aggregate portfolio values and cash balances.

== See also ==
- List of electronic trading platforms
- Stake (online casino)
