= StoneX Trading =

Financial services company

StoneX Trading (formerly City Index)
- Type: Retail trading brand
- Industry: Financial services
- Founded: September 1983; 43 years ago
- Founders: Chris Hales; Jonathan Sparke
- Headquarters: London
- Area served: UK
- Key people: Sean M. O'Connor (CEO, StoneX)
- Services: Financial spread betting (UK); CFD trading; FX trading
- Parent: StoneX Group
- Website: www.stonex.com/en-gb/individuals/

Stonex Trading, formerly City Index, is a United Kingdom-based retail trading brand and part of the StoneX offering spread betting, contracts for difference (CFD) trading and foreign exchange (FX) trading services. The business was founded as City Index in 1983, and became part of the Nasdaq-listed financial services group StoneX following StoneX’s acquisition of GAIN Capital in 2020. In September 2026, the City Index brand in the UK was relaunched as StoneX Trading, bringing the retail trading business under the StoneX brand. StoneX Trading is operated in the UK by StoneX Financial Ltd., which is authorised by the Financial Conduct Authority (FCA).

City Index initially specialised in spread betting before expanding its offerings from the early 2000s to include CFD and FX trading, acquiring several brokerage businesses, and opening offices in Asia and Australia. In 2014, the company was acquired by GAIN Capital. StoneX Group acquired GAIN Capital in 2020, bringing City Index into StoneX’s global retail brokerage business.

== History ==
City Index was founded by Chris Hales and Jonathan Sparke in September 1983, initially backed by a $4 million investment from a US shareholder. The company began operations in March 1984, pioneering spread betting for retail clients. In 1994, entrepreneur Michael Spencer acquired a £6 million stake in City Index, gaining a controlling interest from the founders in 1997.

In 2001, City Index introduced contracts for difference (CFD). In 2005, it acquired IFX Group, owner of FX broker IFX Markets and spread betting provider Finspreads, a London-based company founded in 1999. The Finspreads brand was relaunched in January 2013 but ceased operations on 24 March 2018, when all existing Finspreads accounts were migrated into City Index. In 2006, the company opened offices in Sydney, Singapore, and Shanghai to serve clients across the Asia Pacific region.

In 2008, City Index acquired US-based FX Solutions, the New Jersey-based FX broker. In October 2009, it launched the City Trading app, the first spread betting and CFD mobile platform for the iPhone, later expanding to Android and BlackBerry.

During the 2008 financial crisis, Spencer provided a £70 million capital injection to stabilize the company after significant trading losses. Despite this, in March 2009 City Index briefly breached its banking covenants.

In November 2014, GAIN Capital, owner of Forex.com, acquired City Index for approximately $118 million. At the time, City Index reported annual revenue of $124.8 million and adjusted earnings of $10.7 million but carried net operating losses of around $65 million. The combined company had roughly 235,000 clients in 180 countries and annual trading volumes exceeding $3 trillion.

GAIN Capital had attracted acquisition interest from several bidders in 2019. In June 2020, INTL FCStone (later renamed StoneX Group) made an acquisition offer at $6 per share, valuing the deal at approximately $236 million. Due to GAIN Capital's strong recent performance, including Q2 2020 net revenue of $101 million, many shareholders considered the offer undervalued, and some supported an alternative proposal by JB Capital at $6.25 per share. Despite this shareholder opposition, the deal with INTL FCStone was eventually finalized. The acquisition was also marked by an insider trading scandal involving Joseph Conlan, a former financial services executive at GAIN Capital. Conlan learned confidential details about the pending acquisition from a friend employed at StoneX and purchased GAIN Capital shares ahead of the public announcement. The case concluded with Conlan agreeing to a cease-and-desist order and paying $159,389 to settle regulatory charges.

After the acquisition by StoneX Group, City Index became part of StoneX's global retail brokerage division. Under the new ownership, City Index UK's legal entity was renamed StoneX Financial Ltd, while the City Index brand continued to operate for retail customers. In 2022, City Index underwent a rebranding and updated its trading platforms to include Advantage Web Trader, TradingView, and MetaTrader 4.

In April 2025, City Index Singapore transitioned to Forex.com, another StoneX subsidiary. On 30 August 2025, City Index's Australian operations were rebranded to Forex.com as StoneX moved to consolidate its retail trading businesses under a single global brand. At the same time, StoneX made changes to its regulatory structure: Gain Capital UK (City Index’s former parent company) obtained a Category 5 license from the UAE's Capital Market Authority (CMA) in August 2025, with plans to transfer it to StoneX Financial Ltd and eventually surrender Gain's UK FCA licence. StoneX Financial Ltd (formerly City Index's UK entity) remains the primary FCA-authorised entity for City Index and FOREX.com in the UK.

In September 2026, StoneX Group announced the relaunch of City Index in the UK as StoneX Trading. The City Index UK brand was retired on 12 September 2026, with new account openings moving to StoneX Trading. Existing clients retained their accounts, trading platforms and support services during the transition. StoneX Trading operates as a trading name of StoneX Financial Ltd.

== Marketing and sponsorship ==
In October 2012, City Index launched the City Index Trading Academy, an online educational competition presented as a web series. The project involved eight amateur traders competing over six weeks, with the winner receiving a cash prize of £100,000. The series focused on trading strategies and market dynamics and was distributed through City Index's website and YouTube. The first season concluded with London black-cab driver John Walsh winning the competition after achieving a return on investment of 23.6%.

In January 2021, StoneX and City Index entered into a four-year partnership with Saracens Rugby Club. Under the agreement, StoneX became the club's main sponsor and the club's home ground was renamed StoneX Stadium, while City Index became lead partner on the men's and women's kits.

In December 2021, City Index announced a three-year partnership with the Sydney Roosters, an Australian professional rugby league club, becoming a Platinum Partner.

In 2025, StoneX entered into a partnership with the London Mavericks netball team. The partnership included the London Mavericks StoneX Cup, a school netball competition, and StoneX's involvement with the team's post-home match highlights. London Mavericks currently also identifies the StoneX Cup as part of the partnership.

== Controversies ==
=== The "Plumber and Spaniard" Scandal (2002–2006) ===
In 2002, City Index became involved in the controversial "Plumber and Spaniard" scandal. British businessman Paul Davidson, nicknamed "the Plumber," placed a £6 million spread bet anticipating the rise of his company Cyprotex's share price upon its flotation on AIM. Nigel Howe ("the Spaniard") was the City Index broker responsible for the deal. Investment bank Dresdner Kleinwort Wasserstein subsequently purchased approximately 80% of Cyprotex's shares, allegedly covering City Index's risk exposure, which artificially inflated the share price. The transaction led to market manipulation accusations and triggered an investigation by the Financial Services Authority (FSA). Investors accused Davidson and Howe of market manipulation and appealed to the Financial Services Authority to launch an investigation. After a lengthy inquiry, Davidson was initially set to face a £750,000 fine, which he contested. In May 2006, Davidson was cleared of all charges; however, by then he had declared bankruptcy with debts of approximately £20 million. City Index faced significant reputational scrutiny but was not formally penalized by the regulator.

=== Compliance and reporting failures (2007–2011) ===
In January 2011, the UK Financial Services Authority fined City Index £490,000 for substantial deficiencies in transaction reporting. Between November 2007 and September 2009, City Index incorrectly reported approximately two million transactions, representing nearly 60% of its total required reports. Additionally, around 55,000 transactions were not reported at all. The FSA criticized City Index for inadequate systems and internal controls, emphasizing the risk posed to market transparency and investor protection. The fine was among the largest penalties imposed by the FSA at the time for reporting breaches.

=== Platform exploitation incident (2011) ===
In 2011, day trader Barnett Alexander exploited a technical loophole in City Index's spread betting platform, generating profits of around £630,000. Although Alexander was subsequently fined £700,000 by the FSA for market abuse, the regulator highlighted that City Index had failed to identify and address the platform's vulnerability, despite clear signs of exploitation.

=== Regulatory issues in Australia (2012–2023) ===
City Index's Australian operations faced repeated regulatory scrutiny by the Australian Securities and Investments Commission (ASIC), primarily concerning client money management and misleading statements. In October 2012, ASIC fined City Index Australia twice for making misleading statements on its website regarding client funds. In April 2013, ASIC imposed an enforceable undertaking on the broker after identifying serious deficiencies in client money handling practices, mandating the appointment of an independent auditor.

In November 2023, ASIC required City Index Australia to compensate clients due to multiple weaknesses in change management procedures and errors in leverage ratio limits. This case was part of a broader regulatory initiative, with City Index contributing to an aggregate compensation exceeding AUD $17.4 million, shared among seven CFD issuers, including City Index.
