= SecFinex =

UK-based multilateral trading facility

- Type: Lending & Borrowing market
- Location: London, United Kingdom
- Founded: November 2000
- Owner: Majority owner: Liffe (Holdings) plc (NYSE Euronext) (59.52%); Minority owners: Société Générale Corporate & Investment Banking; Fortis Bank Nederland
- Key people: Allen Postlethwaite, founder and CEO
- Ceased operating in December 2011. Formerly known as PPA Capital Limited

SecFinex was a UK based electronic stock lending and borrowing platform that operated between 2000 and 2011. It was closed down in December 2011 when its main owner NYSE Euronext said that despite it believing that central counterparty would play an important part in stock borrowing in the future the business had not gained enough tracking and they had decided to no longer financially support it. The business was wound down and its authorization was removed from the FSA register on January 6, 2012.

== Overview ==
Originally known as PPA Capital Limited, the company changed its name to SecFinex, Ltd. in November, 2000. As of March 2007, SecFinex, Ltd. operated as a subsidiary of Euronext and later operated as a subsidiary of LIFFE (Holdings) plc. NYSE Euronext took a controlling 51 per cent stake in the London based business in December 2006, with Société Générale and Fortis retaining minority holdings.

The trading platform covered equities on Dutch, French, German, Irish, Italian, Japanese, Spanish, Swedish, Swiss, the United Kingdom and US equity markets.

Transactions on SecFinex were cleared by the following CCPs:

- LCH.Clearnet - for the transactions on Belgian, French, Dutch and Portuguese stocks
- SIS x-clear for stock loan transactions in Austria, Denmark, Finland, Germany, Norway, Sweden, Switzerland and coverage of the UK market planned for 2011

SecFinex Limited was Authorised and Regulated by the Financial Services Authority (FSA)

== Main competitors ==
- EquiLend

== See also ==
- Securities lending
- Straight Through Processing (STP)
- Electronic trading
- NYSE Euronext
