= M1 Finance =

American financial services company

- Type: Privately held company
- Industry: Fintech
- Founded: September 16, 2016; 9 years ago
- Founder: Brian Barnes
- Headquarters: 200 N LaSalle St Ste. 800, Chicago, Illinois, United States
- Key people: Brian Barnes (Founder, CEO)
- Products: M1 Borrow; M1 Invest; M1 Spend
- Services: Commercial banking Stock brokerage Wealth management Electronic trading platform
- AUM: $12.0+ Billion USD (Nov 2025)
- Members: 1,000,000+ (2025)
- Number of employees: 300 (2021)
- Parent: M1 Holdings Inc.
- Website: www.m1.com

M1 Finance (commonly abbreviated as M1) is an American financial services company that offers a robo-advisory investment platform with brokerage accounts, digital checking accounts, and lines of credit. M1 offers an electronic trading platform for the trade of financial assets including common stocks, preferred stocks, fractional-share ownership, and exchange-traded funds. It also provides margin lending, automatic rebalancing services, automatic dividend reinvestment services, and cash management services including debit cards.

The company receives payment for order flow, makes revenue from interest on margin loans, subscription fees, and interchange fees from its credit card. The platform has over $6 billion in assets under management. M1's headquarters is located in Chicago, Illinois. As of 2024, the company has over 1,000,000+ members.

Part of M1 Finance's investment strategy involves micro-investing. It allows users to select a portfolio and have the platform automatically invest additional funds in pre-defined ratios using fractional share ownership.

== History ==
The company was founded in 2015 by Brian Barnes in Chicago.

== Micro investing service ==
Micro-investing refers to investing small amounts of money, usually in the range of a few dollars to a few hundred dollars, into financial assets such as stocks, mutual funds, exchange-traded funds (ETFs), or other investment vehicles.

Micro-investing increased in popularity in the 2020s in part due to the rise of mobile apps that make it easy and accessible for people to invest small amounts of money with low fees using fractional shares. Micro-investing makes it easier for individuals to build a diversified investment portfolio and start investing even with limited funds.

== See also ==
- List of electronic trading platforms
