= StoneX Group Inc. =

Financial services company

- Formerly: INTL FCStone
- Type: Public
- Traded as: Nasdaq: SNEX; S&P 600 Component
- Industry: Financial services
- Predecessors: International Assets Holding Corporation, FCStone Group
- Founded: 1924; 102 years ago
- Headquarters: New York
- Key people: Sean O’Connor (CEO); Bill Dunaway (CFO); Stuart Davison (COO)
- Revenue: ▲US$64.38 billion (2023)
- Net income: ▲US$234.8 million (2023)
- Number of employees: 4,000 (2024)
- Website: www.stonex.com/en-us/

StoneX Group Inc. (previously INTL FCStone) is an American financial services company. The company operates in six areas: commercial hedging, global payments, securities, physical commodities, foreign exchange and clearing and execution services (CES).

As of 2023, the company was ranked No. 59 in the Fortune 500 list of the largest United States corporations by revenue. In July 2020, the company rebranded and changed its name to StoneX Group Inc.

== History ==
=== Foundation and early years ===
StoneX Group Inc. began as a door-to-door egg wholesaler that eventually grew into a butter and egg broker known as Saul Stone and Company. Saul Stone fled persecution in his homeland, Russia, and settled in Chicago in 1921. In 1924, Stone started selling farm wares. Eventually, he moved into hedging futures contracts and dealing in a variety of commodity contracts. In 1938, his firm became a member of the Chicago Mercantile Exchange. In 1946 it was incorporated as Saul Stone & Co. Decades later, Saul Stone & Co. merged with Farmer's Commodity Corporation. After the merger, the new company called itself FCStone Group, Inc.

=== IPO in 2007 ===
In 2007, StoneX went public. The company acquired Chicago-based Downes-O’Neil LLC that same year. In 2008, StoneX acquired Globecot, Inc. and The Jernigan Group, LLC, a brokerage group that worked with global fiber and textile industries. In 2009, International Assets Holding Corporation (IAHC) and FCStone Group merged to become INTL FCStone (now StoneX Group Inc.). Diego Veitia, who also helped found the Costa Rica Stock Exchange, founded IAHC. Veitia served as a chairman with StoneX.

The new company acquired Hanley Group Ltd in 2010, a provider of over-the-counter (OTC) products. It was combined with StoneX's existing OTC trade business. Further expansion happened with a transaction to purchase the futures operation of Miami-based Hencorp Group, Hencorp Futures. Hencorp Futures changed its name to INTL Hencorp Futures and expanded StoneX's trading commodities to include coffee, sugar, and cocoa.

=== Acquisitions, 2010-2025 ===
In 2010, the company partnered with Decisive Farming. INTL provided the organization with Know-Risk, a marketing tool that helps farmers customize crop marketing plans based on price triggers and time triggers.

The company reached an agreement with Hudson Capital Energy LLC (HCEnergy), a New York-based energy risk-management firm, in 2011. INTL's subsidiary, StoneX Group Inc. (previously FCStone LLC), took over HCEnergy's business and customers. This included HCEnergy's Swiss subsidiary, HCEnergy Europe GmbH. The transaction expanded StoneX Group Inc.’s energy risk portfolio to include greater capability in crude oil and refined products. In 2011, StoneX Group Inc. also saw the beginning of INTL’s CommodityNetwork. That year, INTL purchased online industry newsletter CoffeeNetwork from Hencorp Group. A year later, the company announced plans to expand network coverage into the four major commodities: metals, agriculture, energy and softs. It already had cotton and dairy news sites, Globecot News Network and eDairy. The company won the Forex Magnates’s industry award for best liquidity provider.

In 2014, INTL’s subsidiary StoneX (previously INTL FCStone) acquired Sinclair and Company. Sinclair, an introducing broker, focused on dairy, grains and livestock markets. In 2015, INTL finalized a transaction to acquire G.X. Clarke & Co for about $27 million. G.X. was founded in 1979. It was registered with the SEC as an institutional dealer in fixed-income securities.

In 2016, the company acquired Sterne Agee. The sale included Sterne Agee’s clearing business and RIA businesses. INTL purchased the company from Stifel, just over a year after Stifel bought Sterne Agee as part of a $150 million acquisition.

In late January 2018, an agreement between INTL FCStone Financial, a subsidiary of StoneX Group Inc. (INTL FCStone at the time), and European platform Allfunds Bank went live. The agreement gave advisors using FCStone Financial access to thousands of UCITS funds without having to sign individual contracts with each strategies’ manager or distributor. FCStone Financial was the first US-based clearing firm with access to the Allfunds platform. Allfunds is the largest fund platform in Europe and offers access to more than 57,000 funds from over 1,200 fund managers.

Throughout 2018m INTL FCStone along with 91 other Fortune 500 companies had "paid an effective federal tax rate of 0% or less" as a result of Donald Trump´s Tax Cuts and Jobs Act of 2017.

In 2025, StoneX acquired R.J. O'Brien & Associates (RJO), the oldest futures brokerage and clearing firm in the United States, for $900 million, with a plan to absorb all of RJO's global businesses.

=== Metals and futures outside the US, 2011-2020 ===
StoneX first started working with London Metal Exchange (LME) in 2011, when it purchased MF Global Holding's metals unit. In August 2018, StoneX started developing an electronic trading platform for its LME clients, which would be similar to one created for INTL's precious metals clients called PMXecute. There is also PMXecute+, which connects consumers and suppliers of physical gold. In December 2018, StoneX announced that it would be acquiring GMP's US-based fixed-income trading business, formerly known as Miller Tabak Roberts Securities, LLC.

During 2018 INTL FCStone along with 91 other Fortune 500 companies had "paid an effective federal tax rate of 0% or less" as a result of Donald Trump's Tax Cuts and Jobs Act of 2017.

In 2019 StoneX Group Inc. acquired the futures and options brokerage and clearing business of UOB Bullion and Futures Limited in Singapore. In April 2019, StoneX launched a prime brokerage division. The new division offers clearing services for hedge funds, mutual funds, and family offices. In February 2020, StoneX announced the acquisition of U.S.-based brokerage GAIN Capital Holdings Inc., primarily known as the operator of retail brands Forex.com globally and City Index in the UK. The all-cash deal, approved by the boards of both companies, was worth about $236 million in equity value.

=== Farmers Commodities Corporation, 1978-2009 ===
Founded in 1978, the firm was known as the Farmers Commodities Corporation until 2002. StoneX Group Inc. (previously FCStone Group) provided integrated risk management services such as market intelligence and analysis to help commodity traders in industries like agriculture, renewable fuels, energy, food service, carbon credits, and forest products. In 2007, the company went public raising $95 million. StoneX executed more than 100 million derivative contracts in 2008 and was a clearing member on all major US future exchanges. The Group served commercial commodity intermediaries, end-users, and producers around the world. As of Sept. 30th, 2009, StoneX Group Inc. operates as a subsidiary of International Assets Holding Corp.

=== International Assets Holding Corporation, 1981-2010 ===
IAHC began as the International Assets Advisory Corporation in 1981. The company started in Winter Park, Florida in 1981 and was headed by Diego J. Veitia, a graduate of the Thunderbird School of Global Management. The firm's initial focus was the private placements of stocks and bonds of foreign companies. IAAC then turned its attention to high-net-worth clients, including individuals and financial institutions, and diversifying their investment portfolios through the sales of equity securities and global debt. In 1987, Veitia created a holding company called International Assets Holding Corporation which went public in 1994. IAHC transitioned into becoming a market maker of international equity securities in the early 2000s and as of 2010 was a global financial services provider operating through wholly owned subsidiaries in the US, Dubai, Singapore, Argentina, the UK, Brazil, and Uruguay.

=== Merger, 2009 ===
In 2009, StoneX Group Inc. (previously INTL FCStone) and the International Assets Holding Corporation merged, with Sean O'Connor becoming CEO and Diego Veitia Chairman. StoneX operates as an independent business unit of IAHC, ceased trading stock on Sept. 30th, and brings over $229.3 million in operation revenues. IAAC officially became INTL FCStone in Feb. 2011 (now StoneX Group Inc.). StoneX Group Inc. serves more than 32,000 accounts, and more than 330,000 active retail accounts, in more than 180 countries through a network of 70 offices around the world. Within a month of the merger, IAHC expanded operations to the Pacific Rim with a new office in Sydney, Australia.

=== Company name change, 2020 ===
In July 2020, the company rebranded and changed its name to StoneX Group Inc. In October 2020, StoneX finalized its acquisition of Frankfurt-based Giroxx which now operates as StoneX Financial GmbH from within the Global Payments division.

In 2023, StoneX was found to have purchased $4.6 million of illegally mined gold from Coluna, a practice that continued into 2024. Coluna collected illegally mined gold from more than 1000 wildcat mining group.

== Subsidiaries ==
- StoneX Ltd: formerly known as INTL FCStone (Europe) Limited, its name was changed in March 2013. It is based in the United Kingdom.
- StoneX Financial Inc.: formed in 2015 after the merger of three subsidiaries into INTL FCStone Securities Inc. The three subsidiaries were FCStone, LLC, INTL FCStone Partners LP, and FCC Investments, Inc.
- StoneX Markets, LLC
