= Firstrade Securities =

American financial services company

Firstrade Securities Inc.
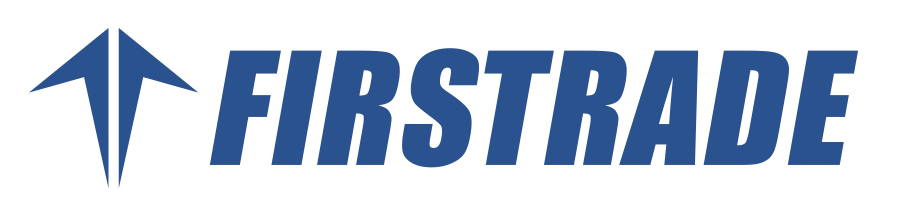
- Type: Privately held company
- Industry: Financial services
- Founded: 1985; 41 years ago
- Founder: John Liu
- Headquarters: Flushing, New York, United States
- Key people: John Liu, CEO
- Products: Broker; Stockbroker
- Total assets: US$46 million (2023)
- Website: www.firstrade.com

Firstrade Securities is a stockbrokerage firm and broker-dealer headquartered in Flushing, New York that offers an electronic trading platform to trade financial assets including stocks, exchange-traded funds (ETF), options, mutual funds, and bonds.

== History ==
The company was founded in 1985 by John Liu, as First Flushing Securities.

In 1997, the company was renamed Firstrade Securities Inc., and the company launched Firstrade.com.

In August 2014, the company opened a new headquarters in Queens, New York.

In May 2022, Firstrade Securities launched its cryptocurrency platform through Firstrade Crypto LLC.

In June 2024, the company launched FirstradeGPT, an artificial intelligence tool.

== See also ==
- List of electronic trading platforms
