= Ripio =

Argentine financial technology and cryptcurrency company

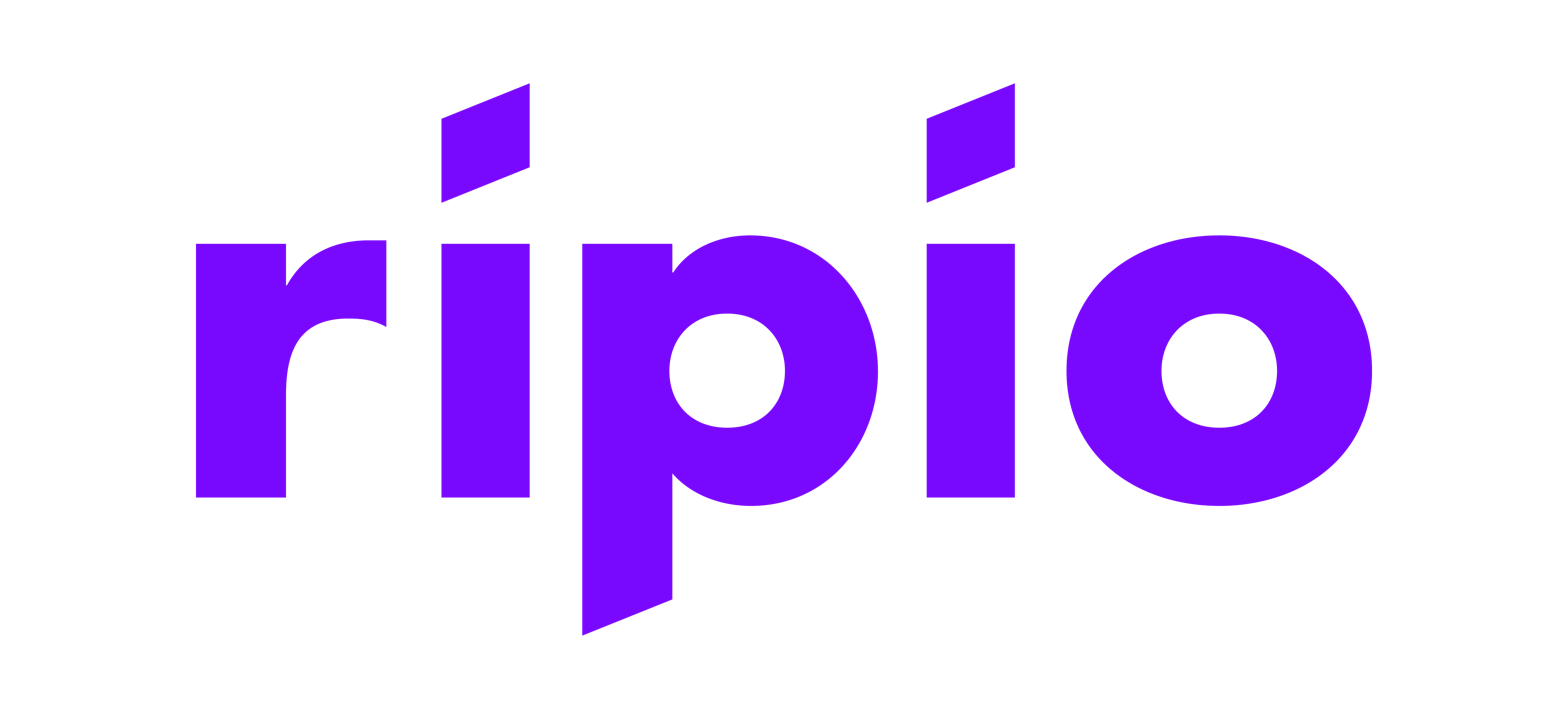
- Formerly: BitPagos
- Type: Private company
- Industry: Financial technology
- Founded: 2013; 13 years ago in Buenos Aires, Argentina
- Founders: Sebastián Serrano; Luciana Gruszeczka; Mugur Marculescu
- Headquarters: Buenos Aires, Argentina
- Area served: Latin America; Spain; United States
- Products: Cryptocurrency trading; digital wallet; stablecoins; payment card; institutional trading services
- Services: Cryptocurrency exchange
- Website: www.ripio.com

Ripio is an Argentine financial technology company focused on cryptocurrencies. Founded in Buenos Aires in 2013 as BitPagos, the company began as a bitcoin payments processor before expanding into a cryptocurrency exchange, consumer wallet products, and services for institutional clients.

== History ==
=== Founding and early focus (2013–2017) ===
The company was established in Buenos Aires in 2013 by Sebastián Serrano, Luciana Gruszeczka and Mugur Marculescu, operating at launch under the name BitPagos.

In 2015, BitPagos acquired Unisend, an Argentine bitcoin exchange, adding exchange and trading services to its offering.

In early 2017, the company rebranded as Ripio and closed a US$1.9 million Series A round. Later that year, in November 2017, Ripio raised US$37 million through an initial coin offering (ICO) for the Ripio Credit Network, a peer-to-peer lending platform built on Ethereum smart contracts.

=== Regional expansion and diversification (2018–2020) ===
In August 2018, Ripio began operating in Mexico, initially offering a wallet product to local users. In 2019, CoinDesk and CoinTelegraph reported that the company planned to launch a crypto-to-fiat exchange in Argentina, Brazil and Mexico, along with an OTC desk for institutional clients.

In June 2020, the World Economic Forum included Ripio in its Technology Pioneers cohort.

=== Consolidation and product expansion (2021–present) ===
Ripio completed its acquisition of BitcoinTrade in January 2021. The Brazilian exchange was at that time one of the country's largest by trading volume.

In late 2022, Ripio announced its entry into the United States market through a Florida-registered entity focused on institutional services.

In June 2023, Blockworks reported that Ripio had been registered to operate in Spain under the Bank of Spain's framework for certain virtual-asset service providers; Bank of Spain guidance describes that register as focused on anti–money laundering compliance rather than prudential supervision.

In 2023 the company launched UXD, a stablecoin linked to the U.S. dollar, and in 2025 introduced wARS, a token linked to the Argentine peso.
