= GAIN Capital =

US-based provider of online trading services

GAIN Capital Holdings, Inc.
- Company type: Subsidiary
- Traded as: NYSE: GCAP (2010–2020)
- Industry: Financial services
- Founded: 1999; 27 years ago
- Defunct: February 2020
- Fate: Acquired by StoneX Group Inc.
- Headquarters: Warren, New Jersey, United States
- Key people: Glenn Stevens (CEO)
- Services: Financial broker, On-line forex trading
- Number of employees: 800+ (2015)
- Parent: StoneX Group Inc.
- Website: www.gaincapital.com www.forex.com www.cityindex.com

GAIN Capital Holdings, Inc. was a US-based provider of online trading services, headquartered in Warren, New Jersey until it was acquired by StoneX Group in 2020. The company provided market access and trade execution services in foreign exchange, contracts for difference (CFDs) and exchange-based products to retail and institutional investors. Trading was provided via one of two electronic trading platforms, its own proprietary FOREXTrader PRO later renamed as StoneX Pro and MetaTrader 4. GAIN Capital allowed retail and institutional clients to speculate on global foreign exchange markets in what is known as ‘margin forex trading’.

GAIN Capital operated retail foreign exchange and CFD trading brands, Forex.com and City Index as well as GTX, a fully independent FX ECN, a multi-dealer foreign exchange trading platform, for hedge funds and institutions. It also owned advisory CFD business, SALT Invest, and futures provider, Daniels Trading.

== History ==
GAIN Capital was founded in 1999 in Bedminster, New Jersey, and was one of the early developers of online forex trading.

The company went public in 2010 when it floated part of its shareholdings on the NYSE; however, the initial IPO was scaled back at the last minute as the target price was not reached.

In October 2014 the company acquired UK-based rival City Index for $118 million, boosting its CFD business and expanding its Forex business in the UK.

On February 7, 2017, GAIN Capital agreed to acquire FXCM's US client base a day after the latter had been barred by the CFTC and NFA from doing business in the United States. The company paid $7.2 million for these accounts, $500 per account that traded within 76 days and $250 for accounts that traded subsequently.

In February 2020, StoneX (formerly INTL FCStone) announced the acquisition of US-based brokerage GAIN Capital Holdings Inc. The all-cash deal, approved by boards of both companies, was worth about $236 million in equity value.

== Operations ==
GAIN Capital was a US-based firm but has serviced customers from over 140 countries worldwide and gains over half its revenue from outside the US. GAIN Capital and its affiliates had offices in New York City, New Jersey, London, Cracow, Sydney, Hong Kong, Tokyo and Singapore. The company's largest retail Forex website is Forex.com, though it also offers white label solutions for dozens of online Forex trading companies, most of which serve the global market.

== Regulatory issues ==
In May 2008 it was told by the Chinese financial regulator, China Banking Regulatory Commission that it had breached rules that prohibit forex trading firms providing retail forex trading services through direct solicitation to Chinese residents through the internet without a permit. It temporarily stopped taking Chinese clients between 2008 and 2010.

In October 2010, Gain Capital was fined by the National Futures Association for allegedly engaging in margin, liquidation and price slippage practices that benefited Gain to the detriment of its customers. They were fined $459,000 and agreed to refund to customers the amount of negative slippage they experienced on the trades that were placed in their accounts between May 1 and July 31.
