= Lightspeed (brokerage) =

American online brokerage

Lightspeed Trading, LLC
- Company type: Privately held company
- Industry: Financial services
- Founded: 2006; 20 years ago
- Headquarters: New York City and Chicago
- Key people: Farid Naib, CEO
- Services: Stockbroker; Electronic trading platform
- Parent: Wedbush Securities
- Website: www.lightspeed.com

Lightspeed Trading, LLC offers an electronic trading platform to trade financial assets including common stocks, preferred stocks, futures contracts, exchange-traded funds, options, mutual funds, and fixed income investments. It also provides margin lending, and cash management services.

== History ==
In 2006, Lightspeed was formed by the spin off of the professional trader platform of E-Trade.

In 2008, Lightspeed acquired Integrity Trading.

In February 2010, Lightspeed acquired NobleTrading.

In June 2010, Lightspeed received an exclusive license to operate the Anvil Professional Trading Platform.

In October 2010, Lightspeed acquired Terra Nova Financial.

In June 2011, Lightspeed acquired Lime Brokerage International of Ireland.

In July 2011, Lightspeed acquired Greenmoor Financial Group, expanding its offerings in options.

In 2018, it was sold to Wedbush Securities by its prior owner Professional Trading Solutions, which LLR Partners had invested in. In the transaction it merged with Lime Brokerage, LLC, an agency brokerage owned by Wedbush.

In 2020, Lightspeed sold the Lime low-latency execution platform to Score Priority, a New York–based brokerage.

in 2021, Lightspeed acquired Coinigy, a cryptocurrency portfolio management company to create Lightspeed Crypto.

== See also ==
- List of electronic trading platforms
