= Bithumb =

Bitcoin exchange based in South Korea

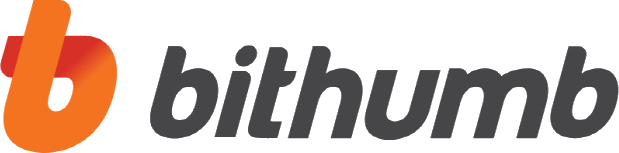
- Formerly: BTC Korea.com; Bithumb Korea
- Type: Private
- Industry: Cryptocurrency exchange
- Founded: January 2014
- Headquarters: Gangnam District, Seoul, South Korea
- Revenue: ▲ ₩651.3 billion (2025)
- Operating income: ▲ ₩163.5 billion (2025)
- Parent: Bithumb Holdings
- Website: bithumb.com
- Footnotes; Partner bank: KB Kookmin Bank (since March 2025)

Bithumb (Korean: 빗썸) is a South Korean cryptocurrency exchange headquartered in Gangnam District, Seoul. Founded in 2014, with headquarters in Seoul, it initially went by the name Xcoin, but was rebranded as Bithumb in 2015. Its operating company was established in January 2014 as BTC Korea.com. Since March 2025, KB Kookmin Bank has provided real-name-verified bank accounts for Bithumb customers' South Korean won deposits and withdrawals. In May 2025, the Korea Fair Trade Commission designated the Bithumb group as a business group subject to public disclosure requirements.

== History ==
In October 2018, BK Global Consortium signed an agreement to acquire a majority stake in BTC Holding Co., Bithumb's largest investor.

On January 22, 2019, the OTC-listed holding company Blockchain Industries signed a binding letter of intent to merge with Bithumb on or before March 1, 2019. The proposal called for the creation of a new publicly traded entity, the Blockchain Exchange Alliance (BXA), which would seek to uplist on either the New York Stock Exchange or NASDAQ, potentially making BXA the first major cryptocurrency exchange to go public.

On April 11, 2019, Bithumb reported a net loss of KRW205.5 billion (US$180 million) for 2018, compared with a profit of KRW427.2 billion in 2017, although its 2018 sales had risen 17.5% to KRW391.7 million. The company attributed the loss to the sharp decline in cryptocurrency prices and lower trading volume.

In October 2024, following a shareholder vote on 30 September 2024, the operating company changed its corporate name from Bithumb Korea to Bithumb.

In January 2025, Bithumb announced that its partner bank for real-name deposit and withdrawal accounts would change from NH NongHyup Bank, with which it had worked since 2018, to KB Kookmin Bank, effective 24 March 2025.

According to data from Kaiko cited by Bloomberg, Bithumb accounted for about a quarter of trading volume across South Korean cryptocurrency exchanges in May 2025, up from a single-digit share in 2023.

For 2025, Bithumb reported revenue of ₩651.3 billion and operating income of ₩163.5 billion.

Bithumb had planned an initial public offering for 2025. In August 2026, it announced a roadmap targeting completion of the offering in 2028, including a transition from K-GAAP to K-IFRS accounting standards.

== Controversy ==
In June 2017, hackers stole user information from a Bithumb employee's personal computer.

In January 2018, Bithumb was raided by the government for alleged tax evasion. They were found not guilty, but still had to pay nearly $28 million in back taxes.

In June 2018, approximately $32 million of cryptocurrency was stolen from Bithumb in a hack.

In January 2019, 30 out of 340 total Bithumb employees were laid off in response to declining trading volume and profits in 2018.

On March 29, 2019, Bithumb said it had been hacked, blaming insiders, with nearly $20 million in EOS and Ripple tokens stolen.

On September 2, 2020, local Korean news reported that Bithumb was raided by the Seoul Metropolitan Police Agency over suspected investment fraud.

In February 2026, Bithumb mistakenly transferred approximately 620,000 bitcoin, at a rate of roughly 2,000 bitcoin per user, to the accounts of 695 customers. The total transferred was in excess of US$40 billion. Bithumb stated that it reversed the transaction within 35 minutes and managed to recover 99.7% of the funds. Bithumb announced compensation of 110% of losses for users who sold at lower prices during the incident and ₩20,000 for users who were logged in at the time, and waived trading fees for one week. The company also announced a ₩100 billion customer protection fund and additional internal controls, including multi-step approval procedures and round-the-clock monitoring of abnormal transactions.
