= Coinsquare =

Canadian cryptocurrency exchange

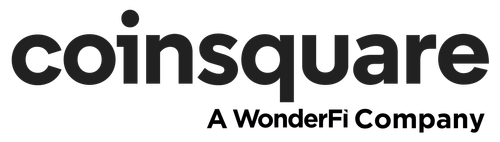
- Industry: Cryptocurrency
- Website: coinsquare.com/en-ca/

Coinsquare is a Canadian cryptocurrency exchange company regulated by the Investment Industry Regulatory Organization of Canada.

In July 2023 Coinsquare closed a merger agreement with fellow Canadian crypto companies CoinSmart and WonderFi in a three way deal.

== Funding ==
In 2018, Coinsquare raised $30 million in funding led by Canaccord Genuity Corporation.

== Data breach ==
In November 2022, it was reported that Coinsquare had suffered a data breach. According to MSN, Coinsquare have stated that although user logins may have been compromised, no malicious activity has been detected.
