= Marketcetera =

Financial software company

- Type: Trading platform
- Industry: Financial services Trading; Hedge funds
- Founded: 2006
- Headquarters: Bend, Oregon, United States
- Key people: Colin DuPlantis (Chief Architect), Roy Agostino (CMO)
- Products: Marketcetera trading platform & support
- Website: www.marketcetera.com

Marketcetera
- Written in: java
- License: GNU GPL version 2
- Repository: https://crucible.marketcetera.com/browse/MATP_PUBLIC

Marketcetera is a financial software company that develops the Marketcetera open source trading platform, linking financial exchanges to users through broker services allowing the development of automated trading systems, essentially acting as a meta-broker itself. The Marketcetera platform uses the ACTIV Financial data steam services for a real-time low-latency equity data feed. The open platform uses the open source library QuickFIX to implement the standardized FIX communication protocol. Marketcetera has offices in San Francisco and New York.

== History ==
Marketcetera was founded in 2006 in San Francisco by Stanford computer scientists CEO Graham Miller and CTO Toli Kuznets. Early in 2008, the firm raised $4M through investors Shasta Ventures and Jack Selby, managing director of Clarium Capital. After a period of testing, version 1.0 of the software was released on 14 January 2009 for windows. On 17 February, with the release of v1.1, Marketcetera became additionally compatible with Linux, increasing its potential market reach. The most recent release was 3.2.1 in September, 2019.

In March 2009, Marketcetera appointed W. Brennan Carley to its board of directors. Carley was the founder of BT Radianz, and has held C-level positions at such financial institutions as Reuters and Instinet, as well as serving on the board of firms such as Yipes.

As of June 2009, Marketcetera are in partnership with NYSE Technologies (the commercial technology division of NYSE Euronext) to provide a 'Software-as-a-Service' (SaaS) Trading Platform on NYSE Technologies’ SFTI (Secure Financial Transaction Infrastructure) Network.

== Current and future usage ==
The aim of Marketcetera is to be used by traders, hedge funds and financial services firms. Marketcetera currently has over 10,000 software downloads, and some hedge funds have commented encouragingly on the prospects of open source platforms in this area. Given that Marketecetra is open source software, the company generate revenue primarily through data and support services, and currently has over 20 active support contracts.

Marketcetera may in future be able to get regulatory approval as a certified broker, and as a result earn extra commission on its trades. Future versions of the software are likely to include tools for trading currencies and commodities.

== Bibliography ==
- "Marketcetera Goes Gold". ZDNet. January 14, 2009. Archived from the original on January 19, 2009.
