= CoinJar =

Australian Cryptocurrency Exchange

- Type: Cryptocurrency Exchange
- Location: Melbourne, Australia
- Founded: May 2013; 13 years ago
- Key people: Asher Tan; Ryan Zhou
- Currency: Cryptocurrencies: BTC, DOGE, ETH, ETC, LTC, ALGO, AVAX, DOT, ADA, XMR, SOL, XTZ; Fiat currencies: USD, GBP, AUD, EUR
- Website: www.coinjar.com

CoinJar is a centralised digital currency exchange with the main function to facilitate the trading of cryptocurrencies by its users and allow to convert these assets into cash. It is one of the earliest cryptocurrency exchanges to launch in Australia.

Established in 2013 in Melbourne, Australia, CoinJar expanded its operations to London, England in 2014.

== History ==
CoinJar was co-founded by Asher Tan and Ryan Zhou in May 2013. The company originated in Melbourne, Australia, through a startup accelerator program and secured initial funding from Blackbird Ventures along with contributions from angel investors.

The company is one of the first Australian cryptocurrency exchanges, starting with services that allowed the purchase and sale of Bitcoin, predominantly servicing an Australian user base.

In its early years, CoinJar raised a seed round of A$500,000, with Blackbird Ventures contributing $228,000, which also supported the launch of CoinJar's Bitcoin wallet, initially registering 10,000 users in Australia. CoinJar raised from US-based investors Digital Currency Group in 2017.

== Regulation and Compliance ==
In 2014, CoinJar expanded its business to the United Kingdom.

At an Australian Parliamentary Hearing Committee, CoinJar, noted that the ATO's GST ruling had rendered it 'uncompetitive against non-Australian rivals'. In 2016, the Australian federal government removed the 'double tax' placed on bitcoin transactions. Despite the regulatory challenges in Australia, CoinJar and other cryptocurrency exchanges in the country expressed a preference for regulatory clarity and licensing regime.

In April 2021, CoinJar was cited among examples of Australian fintechs that have brought their technologies to the UK in Australian Senate Select Committee report on Australia as a Technology and Financial Centre. The company is registered with regulatory authorities including the Australian Transaction Reports and Analysis Centre (AUSTRAC). In October 2021, subsidiary CoinJar UK Limited was registered by the UK's Financial Conduct Authority (FCA) as a Cryptoasset Exchange Provider and Custodian Wallet Provider.

As of December 2022, the company had approximately half a million users.

== Products ==
In August 2018, CoinJar launched The CoinJar Digital Currency Fund, a tracker fund that mirrors cryptocurrency values with currency exposure hedged to Australian dollars. The fund was offered in two classes: Bitcoin only and a mixed fund of Bitcoin, Ethereum, Ripple and Litecoin.

In 2021, CoinJar partnered with Mastercard to issue cryptocurrency-linked payment cards in the Asia Pacific region. In 2022, this initiative included the CoinJar Card, the first crypto-to-GBP credit card in the UK, enabling users to convert cryptocurrencies into fiat currencies instantaneously.

The platform supports deposits in both fiat currencies and cryptocurrencies. CoinJar facilitates trading by matching buy and sell orders on its platform and enables users to convert cryptocurrencies into fiat currencies for withdrawal.

== Business Model ==
CoinJar generates revenue primarily through a transaction fee on the exchange of Bitcoin into standard currencies and vice versa. It offers various services including instant transfers of Bitcoin between individuals, CoinJar Bundles for mixed cryptocurrency portfolios, and a range of trading options over 58 cryptocurrencies.

== Sports Affiliations ==
CoinJar secured a partnership with Brentford FC in the UK, expanding its brand presence through sports affiliations.
