= PC1 cipher =

Block cipher introduced in 1991

The PC1 cipher, also called the Kindle cipher or Pukall cipher 1, is a block cipher introduced in 1991. It is most prominently used by Amazon, Inc., for their Kindle e-book reader's DRM system.

== History ==
The PC1 cipher was designed by Alexander Pukall in 1991.

== Successors ==
Caracachs Cipher formerly known as PC3 Cipher was released in 2000. This algorithm was used by the North Korean hacker group Lazarus Group.

PC4 was released in 2015. It's a block cipher specifically designed for DMR radio communication systems. It uses 253 rounds and the key size can vary from 8 bits to 2112 bits. The block size is 49 bits, the exact size of an AMBE+ DMR voiceframe.
