= Rain (cryptocurrency exchange) =

Bitcoin exchange based in the Middle East and Turkey

- Type: Private company
- Industry: Cryptocurrency
- Founded: 2016; 10 years ago
- Founders: Joseph Dallago. Adam Jon Nelson, Yehia Badawy, Abdullah Almoaiqel
- Headquarters: Bahrain
- Key people: Joseph Dallago (CEO)
- Website: www.rain.com

Rain is a Middle Eastern cryptocurrency exchange company that operates through its holding company, Rain Financial Inc., which oversees Rain Management W.L.L. in Bahrain,

== History ==
Rain was founded in 2017 by Abdullah Almoaiqel, AJ Nelson, Joseph Dallago, and Yehia Badawy to establish a regulated cryptocurrency platform in the Middle East. The company entered the Central Bank of Bahrain’s (CBB) regulatory sandbox in 2017, becoming the first crypto-asset company to be accepted into the program. The regulatory sandbox allowed Rain to collaborate with the CBB and work within a regulatory framework while ensuring compliance with local and Shariah standards.

In 2019, Rain Management W.L.L. became the first licensed crypto-asset service provider in the Middle East after receiving a license from the Central Bank of Bahrain (CBB).

The company raised $2.5 million in a seed funding round co-led by BitMEX Ventures and other investors in 2017. In 2021, it raised $6 million in a Series A funding round led by Middle East Venture Partners. In 2023, Rain Trading Limited received regulatory approval from ADGM’s FSRA, allowing it to expand operations across the UAE and target asset managers for virtual asset brokerage and custody services.

In April 2022, the company introduced a zero percent trading fee structure to simplify the trading process and reduce costs for investors in the Middle East and North Africa (MENA) region.

In mid-2022, Rain Financial reduced its workforce in response to a downturn in the cryptocurrency market which saw Bitcoin drop over 50% and the market shed over $2 trillion. The same year, Rain was ranked #6 on Forbes' list of the 50 most-funded startups.

In January 2022, Rain closed a $110 million Series B funding round led by Paradigm and Kleiner Perkins. The funding was intended to support the company’s expansion across the Middle East and North Africa and to further develop its regulatory and operational infrastructure.

In 2023, Rain Trading Limited received regulatory approval from Abu Dhabi Global Market’s (ADGM) Financial Services Regulatory Authority (FSRA), allowing it to expand its services in the UAE.

== Hacking incident ==
In April 2024, Rain experienced a security breach resulting in the loss of $16 million in cryptocurrency. The U.S. Department of Justice identified the attackers as the North Korean Lazarus Group, which gained access to Rain by using LinkedIn to contact an employee with a fake job offer. The hackers tricked the employee into downloading malware, allowing them to steal private keys and access Rain’s crypto wallets. Some of the stolen funds were traced and partially recovered.
