= EquiLend =

EquiLend LLC
- Type: Lending & Borrowing market
- Location: New York City, USA
- Founded: 2001; 25 years ago
- Owner: WCAS (2024–present); Consortium (2001–24): National Bank of Canada; BlackRock; Goldman Sachs; Credit Suisse; J.P. Morgan Chase; Bank of America Merrill Lynch; Morgan Stanley; Northern Trust; State Street; UBS
- Key people: Rich Grossi (CEO); Laurence Marshall (COO); Paul Nigrelli (CFO); Ken DeGiglio (CIO)
- Website: equilend.com

EquiLend Holdings LLC is a securities lending platform started in late 2001 by a consortium of leading financial services institutions. Founding members included Barclays Global Investors, Bear Stearns, Goldman Sachs, JPMorganChase, Lehman Brothers, Merrill Lynch, Morgan Stanley, Northern Trust, State Street, and UBS Warburg.

== History ==
Rich Grossi, former CEO of ION Corporates, was appointed CEO of EquiLend in October 2024. Previous CEOs of EquiLend include Ian M. Drachman and Brian P. Lamb. Since launching its first platform in 2001, it has grown to service more than 190 financial institution client firms.

On September 5, 2024, it was announced that Welsh, Carson, Anderson & Stowe had completed the acquisition of the majority stake in the company.

In 2018, EquiLend and its prime broker owners were sued in the Southern District of New York for antitrust violations. The case survived motion to dismiss in 2018.

== See also ==
- Securities lending
