= CQG =

US financial software company

CQG, Inc
- Logo of CQG
- Type: Privately Held
- Industry: Financial services
- Founded: Glenwood Springs, Colorado (1980)
- Headquarters: Denver, United States
- Number of employees: 400+
- Website: www.cqg.com

CQG is a US-based company creating financial software for market technical analysis, charting, and electronic trading. CQG specializes mostly in the futures market but provides both real-time and historical data from more than 100 exchanges from North and South America, Europe, Asia and Australia, including CBOE Futures Exchange (http:cfe.cboe.com) CME, CBOT, NYSE, NYMEX, LIFFE, LSE, London Metal Exchange, SGX, SFE, Euronext, ICE (ex IPE, NYBOT, Winnipeg), Osaka Securities Exchange, Tokyo Commodity Exchange, Tokyo Stock Exchange, as well as financial news from several providers.

CQG Integrated Client, which supports all functionality that CQG offers and CQG Trader, which mostly offers electronic trading. CQG also provides an API which enables exporting of real-time and historical market data to third party application for analysis and order execution. CQG Datafactory, which provides historical intraday and tick data worldwide. Portara, CQG's other historical data product, allows you to create individual and continuous back-adjusted streams from daily and intraday futures, forex, cash, ETF's and fixed income data.

== See also ==
- List of electronic trading platforms
