= FXCM =

Online Foreign exchange market broker based in the United States

- Company type: Subsidiary
- Traded as: Nasdaq: FXCM
- ISIN: US3026931069
- Industry: Financial services
- Founded: 1999; 27 years ago
- Founder: Drew Niv
- Headquarters: New York
- Key people: Brendan Callan (CEO)
- Services: Broker; Foreign exchange market
- Parent: Jefferies Financial Group
- Website: www.fxcm.com

FXCM, also known as Forex Capital Markets, is a retail foreign exchange broker for trading on the foreign exchange market. FXCM allows people to speculate on the foreign exchange market and provides trading in contract for difference (CFDs) on major indices and commodities such as gold and crude oil. It is based in London.

The company was banned from United States markets for defrauding its customers. Its former parent company, Global Brokerage, Inc. filed for bankruptcy on December 11, 2017. The operating company, known as FXCM Group, is now owned by Jefferies Financial Group, which changed its name from Leucadia National Corporation in 2018. Global Brokerage shareholders lost over 98% of their investment since January 2015.

On February 6, 2017, the firm agreed to pay a $7 million penalty to settle a suit from the U.S. Commodity Futures Trading Commission (CFTC) involving fraudulent misrepresentation by FXCM to its customers and to regulators. FXCM withdrew its CFTC registration and agreed not to re-register in the future, effectively banning it from trading in the United States. Three top managers resigned under regulatory pressure and the majority owner of the firm changed its name to Global Brokerage Inc., effective January 27, 2017.

Global Brokerage filed for bankruptcy in November 2017, but officially reorganized in February 2018. While the company technically owns a 51% equity stake in FXCM Group, its agreement with Leucadia (now Jefferies Financial Group) and FXCM about future distributions of cash flows places its real economic interest in FXCM at 10 to 50%. Jefferies Financial Group remains the de facto parent company of the FXCM Group.

A Managing Director of Jefferies Financial Group, which before the bankruptcy held a 49.9% equity stake in the operating company, was appointed chairman of the FXCM Group board. Its U.S. accounts were sold to Gain Capital. About 40,000 customer accounts were sold at about $375 each.

== History ==
=== 1999–2008: Founding and Refco stake ===
Forex Capital Markets was founded in 1999 in New York, and was one of the early developers of and electronic trading platform for trading on the foreign exchange market. Initially, the firm was called Shalish Capital Markets, but after one year, rebranded as FXCM. In 2003, FXCM expanded overseas when it opened an office in London which became regulated by the UK Financial Services Authority.

In January 2003, FXCM entered into a partnership with Refco group, one of the largest US futures brokers at the time. Refco took a 35% stake in FXCM and licensed the FXCM software for use by its own clients. Refco filed for bankruptcy on October 17, 2005, a week after a $430 million fraud was discovered, and two months after its initial public offering. Refco's CEO Phillip R. Bennett was later convicted of the fraud.

In November 2005, Refco agreed, in part, to sell its 35% stake back (which included 15,000 customer accounts) to FXCM for $110 million. In March 2006, however, Refco's creditors disallowed the deal and, later, denied a separate $130 million bid by FXCM. Refco's stake in FXCM was eventually sold to a consortium of buyers, including Lehman Brothers Holdings.

=== 2009–2014: Legal issues and initial public offering ===
In May 2010, FXCM, Inc. purchased the UK-based, ODL Group. FXCM had previously acquired ODL's U.S. business in January 2009. The 2010 acquisition made FXCM the largest retail forex broker in the world with over 200,000 clients and assets of around $800 million.

In December 2010, FXCM completed an initial public offering and began trading on the New York Stock Exchange under the ticker symbol, FXCM. Share prices started at $14 with 15,060,000 shares for a total share capital of $211 million. In its IPO prospectus, FXCM described its no dealing desk trade execution.

When our customer executes a trade on the best price quotation offered by our FX market makers, we act as a credit intermediary, or riskless principal, simultaneously entering into offsetting trades with both the customer and the FX market maker. We earn fees by adding a markup to the price provided by the FX market makers and generate our trading revenues based on the volume of transactions, not trading profits or losses.

In August 2011, the National Futures Association (NFA) issued a $2-million fine to FXCM for slippage malpractice. All clients affected by price slippage were compensated within 30 days as part of the terms of the NFA deal. In October of that year, the Commodity Futures Trading Commission (CFTC) ordered FXCM to pay $14.2 million in restitution to clients who had not been awarded positive slippage gains. The following year, in February and March 2011, several class actions lawsuits were filed against FXCM, alleging fraud and racketeering from deceptive and unfair trade practices, and misleading shareholders during the 2010 IPO. From 2005-January 2017, FXCM faced a total of 13 CFTC reparations cases, 17 NFA arbitration decisions, and 8 other regulatory actions in the U.S.

In June 2012, FXCM purchased a controlling stake in Lucid Markets for $176 million net of Lucid cash. Lucid Markets, a London-based automated trading group was at that time recognized as one of the largest FX traders in the world with FX volumes rivaling that of large investment banks. FXCM also entered into a deal with Credit Suisse to develop the FastMatch electronic communication network (ECN). In 2013, FXCM bought a $12-million note issued by Infinium Capital Management, a high-speed trader based in Chicago. FXCM later purchased five trading desks and some physical assets from Infinium in March 2014.

In February 2014 the UK Financial Conduct Authority (FCA) fined FXCM and FXCM Securities Ltd ("FXCM UK") £4 million for slippage violations and for failing to inform the FCA of the CFTC investigation of the same practices. About £6 million was also paid in restitution to FXCM UK’s clients for a total of £10 million ($16.9 million) in fines.

=== 2015–2017: Swiss franc jump and U.S. license loss ===
On January 15, 2015 following a large increase in the price of Swiss francs, FXCM lost $225 million and was in breach of regulatory capital requirements. The following day, the company received a $300-million bailout loan with a 10% interest rate from Leucadia in order to meet its capital requirements. Details of the deal showed that the interest rate could go as high as 17%. Later in January, FXCM announced that it would be forgiving 90% of its accounts that incurred negative balances as a result of the unexpected Swiss franc price movement. In September 2016, Leucadia extended the original two-year loan by one year.

In February 2017, the CFTC fined FXCM, Inc. and three founding partners (including Drew Niv) $7 million for engaging in fraudulent activities. The CFTC found that the company's "no dealing desk" model (known as a direct market access system) routed trades through a market maker, Effex Capital, that was allegedly supported and controlled by FXCM. FXCM was then barred by the CFTC and the NFA as were the three founding partners. In response, FXCM, Inc. changed its name to Global Brokerage, Inc. and named Brendan Callan the interim CEO, replacing Drew Niv. The company also named Jimmy Hallac, a managing director at Leucadia, the chairman. All 40,000 of FXCM's U.S. accounts were sold to Gain Capital.

Global Brokerage, Inc. remained listed on NASDAQ under the ticker symbol, "GLBR." In May 2017, Global Brokerage was notified by NASDAQ that the market value of its stocks were not sufficient for continued listing. In August of that year, FXCM sold its stake in the FastMatch ECN for $46.7 million and used that money to repay part of the Leucadia loan. At that point, FXCM still owed $66.8 million on the loan. In October 2017, the FXCM Group terminated a management agreement with Global Brokerage. The following month, FXCM clarified that, while Global Brokerage held a 50.1% equity interest in the company, it held a minority economic interest. Leucadia owned a 49.9% equity share with a 65% economic interest.

=== 2017–present: Bankruptcy and ownership by Jefferies ===
Global Brokerage, Inc. filed for Chapter 11 bankruptcy in November 2017 and was delisted from NASDAQ in December 2017. Global Brokerage later reorganized out of bankruptcy in February 2018. At that time, however, Global Brokerage's real economic interest in the FXCM Group was between 10 and 50% depending on the amount of distributions FXCM makes. Also in February 2018, FXCM rebranded itself as "FXCM: A Leucadia Company". As of March 2018, FXCM remained the second-largest retail forex broker outside of Japan.

== See also ==
- List of electronic trading platforms
