= Netherlands Authority for the Financial Markets =

Financial supervisory authority in the Netherlands

- Autoriteit Financiële Markten

Agency overview
- Formed: March 2002
- Preceding agency: Securities Board of the Netherlands
- Jurisdiction: Kingdom of the Netherlands
- Headquarters: Amsterdam, Netherlands
- Employees: 700
- Agency executive: Laura van Geest, Chair
- Website: http://www.afm.nl

The Netherlands Authority for the Financial Markets (AFM, Dutch: Autoriteit Financiële Markten) is a financial supervisory authority in the Netherlands.

Whereas it is governed under a national framework of accountability, the AFM increasingly implements policies set at the European Union level. It is a voting member of the Board of Supervisors of the European Securities and Markets Authority (ESMA). It is also a member of the European Systemic Risk Board (ESRB).

== History ==
The Netherlands Authority for the Financial Markets (AFM) was set up on 1 March 2002 as the successor to the Securities Board of the Netherlands (Dutch: Stichting Toezicht Effectenverkeer or STE, itself established in 1989). As part of the legislation that created the AFM, its responsibilities were greatly expanded to cover all financial products, including savings, investments, loans, insurance and accounting.

The AFM falls under the political responsibility of the Minister of Finance but is an autonomous administrative authority, which means that the AFM operates autonomously based on the powers given by the Minister of Finance.

== Responsibilities and operations ==
The Netherlands Authority for the Financial Markets is the body responsible for regulating behaviour on the financial markets in the Netherlands. This includes regulating the behaviour of all parties involved with the savings, loans, investment and insurance markets. It includes regulating all organisations that provide financial products and those that issue products, including stock exchanges.

The AFM has the following three aims:

1. making the financial markets more accessible
2. promoting the smooth operation of the financial markets
3. promoting confidence in the financial markets.

The public, the business sector and the government all depend on the financial products offered on the various markets for many of their activities.

The AFM works in conjunction with the De Nederlandsche Bank which is responsible for prudential regulation in the Netherlands.

== Administration ==
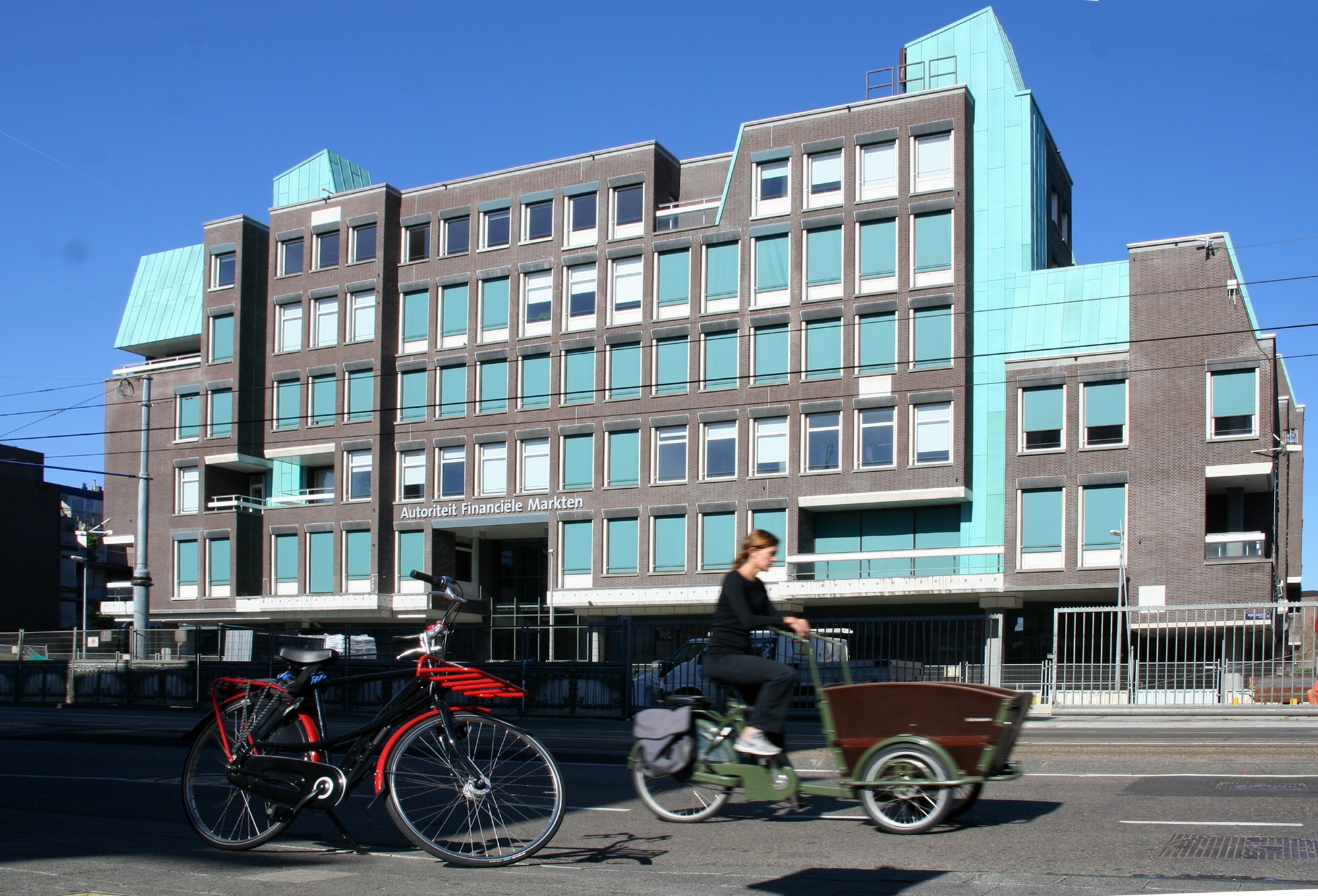
Office of the Netherlands Authority for the Financial Markets

The executive board of the AFM consists of:

- Laura van Geest (chair, since February 2020)
- Hanzo van Beusekom (since September 2018)
- Jos Heuvelman (since September 2018)

Linda Sas is COO since 1 May 2021.

== International ==
With the advent of Euronext stock exchange which is not only located in Amsterdam, but also in Paris, Brussels, London and Lisbon, the AFM works closely with the regulators in those other countries to regulate this cross border stock exchange.

The AFM participates in the International Organization of Securities Commissions (IOSCO), which brings together more than 80 securities regulators from all around the world. In its role as an audit supervisor, AFM is also a member of the International Forum of Independent Audit Regulators (IFIAR).

== See also ==
- Securities Commission
- Economy of the Netherlands
- List of financial supervisory authorities by country
