= Currensee =

Defunct American financial services company

Currensee Inc
- Type: Private
- Industry: Financial services
- Founded: 2008
- Defunct: October 2014
- Fate: Acquired
- Headquarters: Boston, United States
- Key people: Dave Lemont (CEO); Asaf Yigal (Co-founder); Avi Leventhal (Co-founder)
- Products: Social trading Mirror trading Currency trading Social network
- Owner: Oanda Corporation
- Website: www.currensee.com

Currensee (or currensee.com) was a financial services company based in Boston to serve as a social network for foreign exchange (FX, Forex, or currency) traders. The company provided mirror trading services to its clients that allowed them to make trading decisions based on other traders actions. The company was acquired by OANDA in 2013, which decided to close down the service a year later in October 2014.

The idea behind the company was to let traders collaborate on trading strategies, styles, and techniques in what would become known as social trading. This stemmed from the fundamental chaos of the retail forex market and the large number of solo "day traders" that were looking for trading ideas.

One of Currensee's main innovations was the "Trade Leaders Investment Program," in which Currensee used a proprietary algorithm to identify top-performing traders from within the social network, invited them to participate in the program, and then allowed other investors to follow and execute their trades in their own brokerage account, something that was akin to the mutual fund system based in stock indexes.

== History ==
The company was founded in 2008 by software developer Asaf Yigal and Forex trader Avi Leventhal, at the time of the late-2000s recession. They identified an opportunity to offer Forex trading as an alternative asset class and a new way to trade together.

The company was led by CEO Dave Lemont, and was headquartered in Boston's North End neighborhood. Currensee was funded by North Bridge Venture Partners, Egan-Managed Capital, and Vernon & Park Capital. They were a member of the National Futures Association and registered with the Financial Services Authority.

It was acquired by the forex broker Oanda Corporation in September 2013.

On October 9, 2014, Oanda Corporation announced that on October 31, 2014, Currensee and the OANDA Trade Leaders Program (OTLP) will cease operation.

== The Currensee Social Network ==
Together Yigal and Leventhal combining social networking with real trade collaboration. Currensee's goal was to bring transparency to retail Forex trading by creating an active network of traders and a different way to make investing decisions. The Currensee trading social network connected retail Forex traders from around the world so they could see each other's actual trades and share trading strategies in real time to make more informed trade decisions.

Traders linked their live brokerage accounts to Currensee, so when they participated in discussions and on trading teams, fellow traders could look at their trading performance and make an informed decision about their next trade. This form of social trading, or trading together, allows Forex traders to collaborate and share their Forex best practices, trading strategies, preferred pairs and economic indicators, and so on. This is a key differentiator, as there is a wide discrepancy between user performance in "demo accounts" and live brokerage accounts.

As of 2010, the social network was made up of members from over 80 countries connecting with other traders to form online trading teams, share trading ideas, market insights, and trading strategies. With the 7,000-member community traded approximately $50 billion in volume per year.

Currensee's motto was “Trade Together”. Currensee differentiated itself from other online trading communities by allowing only live Forex brokerage accounts to be linked in a trader's Currensee profile. They did not link demo accounts. The company's message of “Real trades. Real traders. Real time.” supported their stance on transparency in the Forex market. Currensee's competitors included eToro, FX Copy, and ZuluTrade.

=== Trade Leaders Investment Program ===
In October 2010, Currensee launched their Trade Leaders Investment Program (TLIP). Investors in the TLIP selected the Trade Leader (or Trade Leaders) whose trades they wanted to follow and execute in their own trading account. Trade Leaders were selected from the members of the Currensee social network via a proprietary algorithm developed by Currensee's engineering team, and were screened for eligibility based on historical performance, risk management, and returns.

Investors in the program selected the Trade Leaders they wanted to invest in, allocate their funds, and build Trade Leader portfolios. Whenever a Trade Leader executed a trade, it was mirrored in the investor's own brokerage account. The investors were able to see every trade that was made. The model was similar to that of a stock mutual fund.

=== Leaderboard and the Trader Authority Index ===
The Trader Leaderboard ranked the top traders in the Currensee community based on historical and real-time performance.

Trade Leaders featured on Currensee's Leaderboard were measured against the Trader Authority Index (TAI). The TAI is a proprietary algorithm that combines performance, risk and experience into a single index. The TAI score was displayed on the Currensee Trade Leaderboard and on every Trade Leader's profile.

=== Tweet My Trades ===
Currensee allowed its members the option of automatically sharing their open and closed positions using the Tweet My Trades feature using Twitter. When a trader executed an order, Currensee automatically sent a tweet on the trader's behalf. This served a dual purpose, as the high volume of daily tweets spread throughout the Forex community on Twitter extended their reach beyond their own network of users.

=== Currensee Social Indicators ===
Currensee Market Watch Social Indicators is another proprietary element; this one aggregates the trading knowledge of the network to deliver unique social data. Currensee Social Indicators provided real-time, aggregate trade information by currency pair along with volume, percentage short/long, and winning/losing across the community. Members could see which of their “trading friends” were trading a particular pair and could use that information to make more informed trading decisions. This ability to share amongst a community is a key pillar of successful social networks, although it's unknown how effective this data is for new traders.

== See also ==
- List of electronic trading platforms
