= ActivTrades =

UK-based brokerage firm

- Industry: Financial services
- Founded: 2001
- Headquarters: London, United Kingdom
- Website: www.activtrades.com

ActivTrades is a UK-based brokerage firm providing an electronic trading platform to trade Forex, Contracts for Difference (CFDs), and spread betting. It provides services to retail and institutional traders via the electronic trading platforms ActivTrader, MetaTrader 4, MetaTrader 5 and TradingView.

The company's client base is primarily based in Europe, especially in Italy and Germany, as well as in South America, the Middle East and South East Asia.

== History ==
Founder and Chairman Alex Pusco established ActivTrades as a stockbrokerage in Switzerland in 2001 and moved to London in 2005.

The Forex broker expanded its product range offering MetaTrader 4 in 2007 and adding CFDs on indices and commodities to its offer in 2008.

ActivTrades expanded its presence in the UK, Eastern Europe, the Middle East and Asia, and strengthened its position across Central Europe in 2012. The company also became a regular sponsor of the World of Trade Conference and has supported the conference for several years.

The first independent World of Trading Awards occurred in Germany in 2013, for which ActivTrades was recognised for as the top Forex Broker in relation to the MetaTrader platform.

In March 2012, the company offered MetaTrader 5 to its users and included financial spread betting to its portfolio for UK-based clients.

In 2013, ActivTrades implemented its Negative Balance Protection Policy and a separate insurance protection as excess to the FSCS insurance. This policy is underwritten by QBE Underwriting Limited and other participating syndicates at Lloyd's of London.

The launch of the Smart Tools, a series of add-ins for its trading platforms, followed later that year.

In 2015, ActivTrades launched its own Prepaid Master Card. In 2016 the company launched its proprietary trading platform ActivTrader. In 2017, ActivTrades strengthened its client insurance protection to £1.0 million, one of the highest in the industry.

== Operations ==
ActivTrades is headquartered in London. The company employs more than 200 individuals, covering key areas of the business such as customer service (a multilingual team serving over 14 different languages), marketing, compliance, finance, risk management and IT among others.

They operate three branches outside the UK – in Milan, Sofia and the Bahamas. The Milan office was opened in 2011 to better support clients in this area. The company's larger branch in Sofia, Bulgaria, opened in 2012 and now employs more than 100 people and handles the programming and technical development aspects of the company. The remainder of ActivTrades' employees are in its UK headquarters.

=== Platforms and mobile trading ===
ActivTrades offers MetaTrader 4 and 5, which are also available for mobile devices such as the iPhone, iPad and Android. They also provide swap free accounts as well as access to the markets via ActivTrader, a web and mobile platform to buy and sell instruments on the go.

=== Cryptocurrencies ===
In December 2017, ActivTrades launched crypto CFDs in Bitcoin, Litecoin and Ethereum for its clients. The offering of the three cryptocurrency pairs became available with a maximum trading leverage of 1:5, to ensure enough margin is allocated upfront in the event of the potentially strong movements cryptocurrencies tend to experience.

Commenting on the news, CEO Pusco, said, "Now that leading derivatives marketplaces such as the CME and CBOE have started offering Futures contracts on Bitcoin there is more liquidity in the cryptocurrencies market and we can offer a higher quality product for our traders."

In January 2018, ActivTrades gave its customers access to Ripple after a December where it grew 1500% to become the third biggest cryptocurrency for market capitalisation after Bitcoin and Ethereum.

=== Regulation ===
The company is authorized by the Financial Conduct Authority (FCA) in the UK and by CONSOB in Italy, and is also a member of the Financial Services Compensation Scheme. The firm was fined £85,750 in 2011 for failure to segregate customer funds. Since, the broker has increased its client funds protection insurance from £500,000 to £1 million as excess of the FSCS threshold.

=== The Swiss franc case ===
ActivTrades is dedicated to providing a secure trading environment for its clients. This was evident with the Swiss-Franc decision in 2015. As a broker offering balance protection, ActivTrades took early precautions and increased margin requirements. This avoided the negative effects caused by the extreme market volatility.
