= P2P asset management =

Peer-to-peer asset management (P2P asset management) is the practice of sharing investment strategies between unrelated individuals, or "peers", without going through a traditional financial intermediary such as a bank or other collective investment management vehicle.

== Overview ==
The rationale for P2P asset management is financial disintermediation. When multiple intermediaries participate in an investment management transaction, there is the potential for a conflict of interest between providers and buyers of the service, in a well documented sequence described in economic theory as the principal–agent problem. Intermediaries seek profit maximization. In the context of investment management, they offer the most attractive risk/return propositions to larger, more sophisticated customers. This maximizes their commission revenue for a given distribution effort. Further, given the option between two comparable investment opportunities, an intermediary enticed by investment management kickbacks will recommend the option most lucrative to him, perhaps at the expense of the best interests of non-sophisticated investors.

This regime is under regulatory and competitive pressure because it privileges large, sophisticated investors at the cost of the choice available to the relatively worse-off, and because incentives are against the most vulnerable element of the chain. The FCA (UK), have implemented the "treating customers fairly" policy, with wide-ranging reforms such as the Retail Distribution Review, gradually banning "kickbacks" whereby providers of investment management services reward "independent" advisers who place their products.

Intermediaries such as financial advisers serve as an interface between portfolio managers and investors. A large fraction of their compensation is often provided through kickbacks from the portfolio manager.

Rather than the symptom – kickbacks and inadequate advice – new competitors tackle the issue – multiple intermediaries – by disrupting the intermediation chain. The use of intermediaries does not appear to bring economic benefits to investors. Bergstresser, Chalmers, and Tufano (2009) compared mutual funds offered through the brokerage channel with those offered directly to investors. Propositions leverage the reach of the Internet to pair a central provider of investment management services with end-customers online.

P2P asset management takes dis-intermediation full circle. Rather than a central provider directing investors choices, an information exchange takes place between all investors, whereby the best performing strategies by all are made available to all.

== History ==
The first completely P2P provider is Darwinex (UK) that is an FCA-approved FX broker and asset manager, which offers copy trading to its users. Darwinex was founded in 2012 and describes themselves as an exchange pairing providers with buyers of investment strategies, without intermediaries. Buyers pay providers with a share in their investment profits, with Darwinex acting as a central counter-party that independently lists the strategies for a public quoted price based on the underlying assets, rates strategy quality and manages investor risk.

P2P asset management offers the potential benefit vs. centralized providers that all participants crowdsource strategies that are independently rated in a competitive set-up.

== Characteristics ==
While peer-to-peer asset management shares some of the characteristics of traditional investment management services (like publicly traded stocks and bonds), owing to its innovative nature it is sometimes referred to as an alternative financial service.

The key characteristics of peer-to-peer asset management are:

- it is conducted for profit;
- it is open to all, without minimum investment volumes
- no necessary common bond or prior relationship between strategy providers and investors;
- intermediation by a peer-to-peer asset manager or strategy exchange;
- transactions take place on-line;
- Investors pick their chosen strategies without 3rd party advice;

Early peer-to-peer asset management was also characterized by disintermediation and reliance on social networks but features like social trading have started to fade. Since "Social Trading" disclosed live trades, investors learnt to replicate the strategies without compensation to the best providers, who then refused to publish them.

Popular providers of P2P asset management services such as eToro, Darwinex and other companies provide the following services:

- Brokerage and execution services for strategy providers to route their strategies to the market
- Rating services benchmarking strategies for desirable attributes like experience, risk management, discipline, timing, performance and scalability
- Risk management services shielding investors from unexpected deviations from target risk by the strategy providers
- Custody services (typically include the settlement, safekeeping, and reporting of customers' marketable securities and cash) – in segregated accounts with low risk counterparties
- Verifying investor identity, employment and income under customer protection legislation such as MiFID in Europe
- Processing payments from investors and carrying out the delivery versus payment payment to the providers agreeing to their strategy being replicated
- Regulatory cover (asset management is a regulated activity that only authorized persons may legally carry out) and legal compliance and reporting
- Attracting new providers and investors (marketing)

== Legal regulation ==
P2P asset managers broadly require two sets of regulatory permission. The first is to carry out brokerage services on behalf of traders and investors. The second is to manage investment strategies on behalf of retail or professional investors.

In the UK, these two permissions are the local implementation of MiFID regulation, referred to as "Dealing in investments as agent" for brokerage services, and "Dealing in investments as principal" and "Managing Investments" for the asset management side of the proposition. Further, permission is required for "Arranging safeguarding and administration of assets", which grants investors protection under the FCA Client Money Rules.

An important nuance is that P2P asset managers could suffer a conflict of interest, if in addition to acting in an agent capacity (or a trader), providing investment management and brokerage services, they entered deals for their own account, acting as principals. This would stack their principal interests against the customers it served as agent. Traditional providers of financial services potentially suffering this conflict claim to overcome it by enforcing a Chinese wall.

P2P managers tackle the issue at source by acting exclusively in an agent capacity. Customers may verify this restriction by ensuring that P2P managers hold the "matched principal restriction", whereby the regulator bans their engaging in any activity as a principal. A further test to identify conflicts of interest is to verify that execution services are provided at arms' length through 3rd parties, ideally recognized exchanges (any stock exchange agreed upon by the competent authorities of the parties), at public prices.

== Advantages and criticism ==
The main advantage of P2P asset management is the lack of intermediaries, which results in two structural advantages.

The first is that all incentives are aligned. The strategy provider can be certain that the strategy is not disclosed by the exchange because this would drop its prize to zero and hurt the exchange. The investor can be certain that the exchange will do its best to rate the strategies accurately, since it is the only way to ensure long term volumes.

The second advantage is that any profits achieved by the strategies are only shared between the strategy provider, the buyer, and the exchange. There is a single intermediary, without which the profit exchange is not possible, but no more.

Some have criticised P2P asset managers for the lack of "professional" asset management expertise by the strategy providers. Such relations are governed by the FCA. Individuals and businesses can file a complaint with FCA. The Financial Ombudsman Service is an alternative organization, if one is dissatisfied with their FCA interaction.

== See also ==
- Algorithmic trading
- Asset management
- Enterprise asset management
- Global assets under management
- Investment management
- List of asset management firms
- List of investment banks
- Principal–agent problem
- Social trading
- Trading strategy
