= Mirror trading =

Form of investing

Mirror trading is a trading selection methodology that can be carried out in both the foreign exchange and the stock markets; however, this is much more common in trading in the foreign exchange market.

The mirror trading method allows traders in financial markets (and, to a lesser degree, stock markets) to select a trading strategy and to automatically "mirror" the trades executed by the selected strategies in the trader's brokerage account.

There are two specifics of mirror trading. The first is connected with fundamentals of trading: to execute trades, investors copy signal services and auto-trading services. The second factor relates to the investment amounts, as mirror trading is linked to large investments.

Traders can select strategies that match their personal trading preferences, such as risk tolerance and past profits. Once a strategy has been selected, all the signals sent by the strategy will be automatically applied to the client's brokerage account. The trades are delivered and executed automatically with entry and exit points on multiple currency pairs. No intervention is required by the client as all the account activity is controlled by the platform.

Clients may trade one or more strategies concurrently. This enables the trader to diversify their risk while maintaining trading control of their account.

== History ==
Since its inception in the early 2000s, mirror trading has become widespread on financial markets. Mirror trading has influenced the development of copy trading and social trading.

Mirror trading and copy trading were preceded by automated and algorithmic trading. There existed an automated trading system (ATS) that allowed brokers to share their trading history with others. Mirror Trader was one of the first auto-trading systems that was introduced in 2005. It was developed by Tradency.

With the development of financial instruments and digital tools, mirror trading gradually entered the portfolios of companies.

Since 2007, ETX Capital has made publicly available on its platform a range of financial instruments, including mirror trading.

The same year, IC Markets (International Capital Markets) began offering mirror trading, later growing to 200 countries globally with a trading record of US$1.016 trillion per month in 2021.

In 2010, eToro launched an electronic trading platform that started offering mirror trading operations in 130 countries, in 15 languages, to 25 million users globally, administering clients' assets totaling US$10.6 billion.

In 2012, FXCM (Forex Capital Markets) released an app-based trading platform with mirror trading. The same year, the European Securities and Markets Authority (ESMA) stated that mirror trading and copy trading constitute automated execution of trade signals and operate without client interaction.

== Mirror trading vs. copy trading ==
Mirror trading is sometimes also referred to as copy trading although copy trading differs slightly from mirror trading in the way that accounts are linked. In copy trading, the trader directly copies the moves of an individual successful trader; whereas in mirror trading, investment decisions are based on algorithms developed from trading patterns of a number of successful traders. Forex brokers that offer mirror trading typically review, verify, and validate the trading results of strategies they add to their platform, which aids in identifying and eliminating losing trades. Before accepting a new strategy, a broker may require it to have a 12-month track record of profitability and a certain maximum drawdown limit.

Traders might be system developers, individual investors, or financial organizations.

== Differences from copy trading and program trading ==
Mirror Trading and Copy Trading are both examples of social trading, which utilizes social networks and websites such as Twitter, YouTube, and Facebook to enable users to communicate and trade investment-related information. Social trading is a relatively new method for obtaining investment ideas and trading advice, as compared to the traditional utilization of the opinions of professionals and experts. While engaging in social trading, there are always two alternatives users could choose from: Mirror Trading and copy trading.

== Misperception regarding fraud ==
Due to the mirror-trading money laundering scheme performed by the Deutsche Bank’s Moscow, New York and London branches in 2017, the term mirror trading began to be associated with fraudulent activities. In contrast, legitimate mirror trading is not fraudulent and is considered to be advantageous for novice investors. This outcome could be explained by the usage of algorithmic key elements in mirror trading. They replicate successful trades and patterns of experienced traders without depending on individual emotions. The process of mirror trading involves participants aligning their financial decisions with those of an established trader. This means that not everyone who engages in mirror trading is required to have expertise or experience with the assets they choose to trade.

In the decade preceding the Russian mirror-trading scheme, Deutsche Bank was informed of substantial and widespread compliance concerns. The offsetting trades in this instance lacked economic purpose and could have been used to facilitate money laundering or other illegal activity.

== See also ==
- Algorithmic trading
- Social trading
- Copy trading
- List of asset management firms
- P2P asset management
- Trading strategy
- Electronic trading platform
