= Pyramiding =

Pyramiding may refer to:

- Pyramiding, a deformity in turtle shells
- Pyramiding, a practice in using performance-enhancing substances
- Pyramiding (tax evasion), a practice where an employer intentionally fails to remit payroll taxes to the appropriate taxation authority
- Pyramid trading, a trading strategy
- Pyramid scheme
