= Foreign exchange autotrading =

Retail forex platform

Forex autotrading is a slang term for algorithmic trading on the foreign exchange market, wherein trades are executed by a computer system based on a trading strategy implemented as a program run by the computer system.

The trading strategy consist of a set of criteria, and is typically programmed, but can also be created by using a method combining the set of criteria visually without programming. It can be run in highly specialized setups, but is also used by private traders on more simple platforms.

The set of criteria used in a trading strategy for Automated Trading are mostly based on technical analysis.

== Types ==
There are two types of automated forex trading which consist of:

- A completely automated system or known as a robotic forex trading: Generally, this method is what you would classify as a "trading machine" or "black box trading" which executes orders based on certain algorithms based on its creator. The creator of the automatic trading script has already decided on the aspects of the order such as the timing, price or quantity and initiates the order automatically. Users can only interfere by tweaking the technical parameters (such as lot size, risk parameters, stop-losses and take profit) of the program; all other control is handed over to the trading script.
- A Signal-based forex generator: You need to manually execute orders generated by a trading system which has an algorithm in-built to highlight a potential entry and close signal and a user manually executes these trade orders with a broker.

=== Advantages ===
An automated trading environment can generate more trades per market than a human trader can handle and can replicate its actions across multiple markets and time frames. An automated system can trade tirelessly and continuously without any disturbance. An automated system is also unaffected by the psychological swings that human traders are prey to. This is particularly relevant when trading with a mechanical model, which is typically developed on the assumption that all the trade entries flagged will actually be taken in real time trading.

=== Disadvantages ===
While Forex autotrading systems, especially cloud-based ones that are active 24/7, are an attractive idea to many investors, as a decentralized and relatively unregulated market, the risk of Forex scams is high. Forex autotrading, as it brings Forex trading to the masses, makes even more people susceptible to frauds. Bodies such as the National Futures Association and the U.S. Securities and Exchange Commission have issued warnings and rules to avoid fraudulent Forex trading behavior.

== See also ==
- Automated trading system
- Retail forex
- Forex signal
- Retail forex platform
- Algorithmic trading
- National Futures Association (NFA)
- U.S. Securities and Exchange Commission (SEC)
