= ZuluTrade =

Greek financial technology company

- Type: Private company
- Industry: Financial services
- Founded: Virginia, United States, 2007
- Founders: Leon Yohai; Kosta Eleftheriou
- Headquarters: Athens, Greece
- Key people: Tajinder Singh Virk(CEO)
- Products: Social trading platform
- Number of employees: 75-100
- Parent: Finvasia Group
- Website: www.zulutrade.com

ZuluTrade is a Greek financial technology company that operates an online and mobile social and copy trading platform. The platform allows users to automatically copy the trades of other investors in the foreign exchange market. As of 2014 ZuluTrade had around one million users and an executed trading volume of over $800 billion.

== History ==
ZuluTrade was founded in 2007 by Leon Yohai and Kosta Eleftheriou. Eleftheriou left the company in 2008. Yohai traded on the FXCM trading platform prior to founding ZuluTrade. He created a software connected to FXCM's API that allowed him to copy trading strategies in his realm of interest. The concept was then put into beta in 2008. By 2009, the company had over 4,500 signal provider portfolios whose trading strategies could be copied by the platform's user base.

In 2011, ZuluTrade was listed among The Daily Telegraph's "Start-Up 100" in the category of "Finance, Payments and Ecommerce." The company also unveiled several new features including the ability to follow other followers (rather than just signal providers) and the requirement for signal providers to be profitable in order to receive payment. In November 2012, ZuluTrade redesigned their website and added more new features including ZuluGuard. By the end of 2013, the company had around 120 employees, 40 of whom were designated for customer support.

In September 2014, Zulutrade expanded in Japan through the acquisition of a regulated investment advisor, Market Crew Investment Advisor Co., Ltd., and launched its collaboration with local FX retail brokers. The first Japanese broker was Arena FX Co., Ltd. In March 2015, ZuluTrade Group announced that the platform was awarded an EU Portfolio Management License from the European Union. The designation made the company a licensed portfolio management company in the EU.

In April 2019, the company launched Macaso, a copy-trading service in Japan. It partnered with local broker Excite One to launch the service. In 2020, ZuluTrade expanded to United States which made it regulated in three territories in the finance including Japan, the European Union, and the US.

In December 2021, ZuluTrade was acquired by the Finvasia Group.

In November 2022, the company announced to omit profit-sharing fees from its investors account.

== Integrations and Partnerships ==
In Feb 2023, ZuluTrade integrated with MetaTrader 5 and ActTrader to broaden the available options of platforms for traders.

In March 2023, the company partnered with Seychelles-based FxCentrum and added X Open Hub to its offering of trading platforms.

In July 2023, ZuluTrade partnered with the Forex and CFD broker Hextra Prime.

In March 2023, ZuluTrade announced it had received the approval of the Financial Services Commission (FSC) of Mauritius (Licence No. IK21000018) to provide wealth management services.

== Service ==
Users can select and mirror trading strategies developed by other account holders. The user base is typically split into two categories: signal providers and followers. Account holders acting as signal providers allow their trading profiles and transactions to be replicated by other users. Users can also copy trading portfolios aggregated by other account followers. Signal provider compensation fees are based on the success and popularity of their trading strategies.

The platform includes an automated feature designed to disconnect an account from a signal provider if the underlying trading parameters shift. Lock Trade allows users to verify the execution of a trade after the signal has been received. The website also features several social network-like features including comments and forums. The platform also has a feature called ZuluScript which allows users to create scripts that designate specific parameters as criteria for trading robots (known as "Expert Advisors") to automatically start making trades. Additionally, ZuluTrade operates a binary option social trading platform.

ZuluTrade provides rankings of investor performance and allow investors to immediately observe and copy other trader's portfolios. This is provided by simulator which shows overall profit, alerts user if a margin call occurred and even allows user to download a spreadsheet of all the simulated trades.
