= Sushilfinance =

Indian broking house

Sushil Finance Group
- Company type: Private company
- Industry: Financial services
- Founded: Mumbai, India, 1982
- Headquarters: 12, Homji Street, Fort, Mumbai, India
- Key people: Sushil Shah, Ajay Shah, Viral P. Parikh
- Services: Equities, Currencies trading, Online trading, Mutual funds, Insurance broker
- Parent: Sushil Financial Services Private Limited
- Divisions: Sushil Finance Consultants Limited; Sushil Capital Private Limited; Sushil Insurance Brokers Private limited
- Website: www.sushilfinance.com

Sushil Finance Group is an Indian stock broking firm that is a member of the Bombay Stock Exchange (BSE) as well as the National Stock Exchange of India (NSE). It is among the oldest Indian broking houses established in 1982. Sushil Finance Group has its headquarters located in Mumbai, the capital city of the Indian state of Maharashtra.

Led by Sushil N. Shah, the diversified financial services group uses a franchise model through which it helps investors to set up partnership businesses. As of 2013, the Group was empanelled with more than 50 financial institutions and banks, and has more than 600 franchisees across the country.

Sushil Finance's expertise lies in providing market research and has more than 50 research products under its brand. This enables the Group to offer advice across segments like IPOs, mutual funds, equities, currencies and fixed income.

== History ==
The group was established in 1982 by Sushil N. Shah.

In 2012, the Group launched an independent insurance arm called Sushil Insurance Brokers Private Limited (SIBPL) to cater to the insurance needs of prospective investors. The Group also released a number of investment related products, which cater to investors with lower risk appetite.

== Sushil Finance group of companies ==
- Sushil Financial Services Private Limited
- Sushil Finance Consultants Limited
- Sushil Capital Private Limited
- Sushil Insurance Brokers Private limited
