= SmartTrade Technologies =

French financial software company

smartTrade Technologies
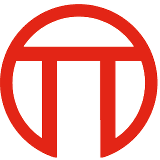
- Company type: Private
- Industry: Financial technology
- Founded: 1999; 27 years ago
- Headquarters: Aix-en-Provence, France
- Key people: David Vincent (Chief Executive Officer)
- Products: Software and services
- Website: smart-trade.net

smartTrade Technologies is a French financial software company that provides technology to financial institutions. Smart Trade develops software and provides software as a service for matching for equities, fixed income, and forex trades, an FX eCommerce and single dealer platform, an OTC and derivatives dealing systems, commodities dealing platform (including precious metals), and a Smart Order Routing system.

The company has its headquarters in Aix-en-Provence Southern France, with subsidiaries in London, Geneva, Milan, Istanbul, New York City, Singapore, Toronto and Tokyo.

== History ==
Harry Gozlan and David Vincent created smartTrade in 1999. They became Chairman of the board and CEO of the company respectively.

In 2020, Hg Capital, a European investment firm, invested in the company by buying stakes from early investors Keensight Capital and Pléiade Venture.

In November 2021, smartTrade acquired Canadian TickTrade Systems.

== Products ==
- LiquidityCrosser
- LiquidityOrchestrator
- LiquidityDistributor
- LiquidityAggregator
- LiquidityConnect
- LiquidityFX
- smartFI
- smartAnalytics
- Crypto's
