= PAMM =

PAMM may refer to:

- Percent allocation management module
- Pérez Art Museum Miami
