= Pyramid trading =

Type of trading strategy

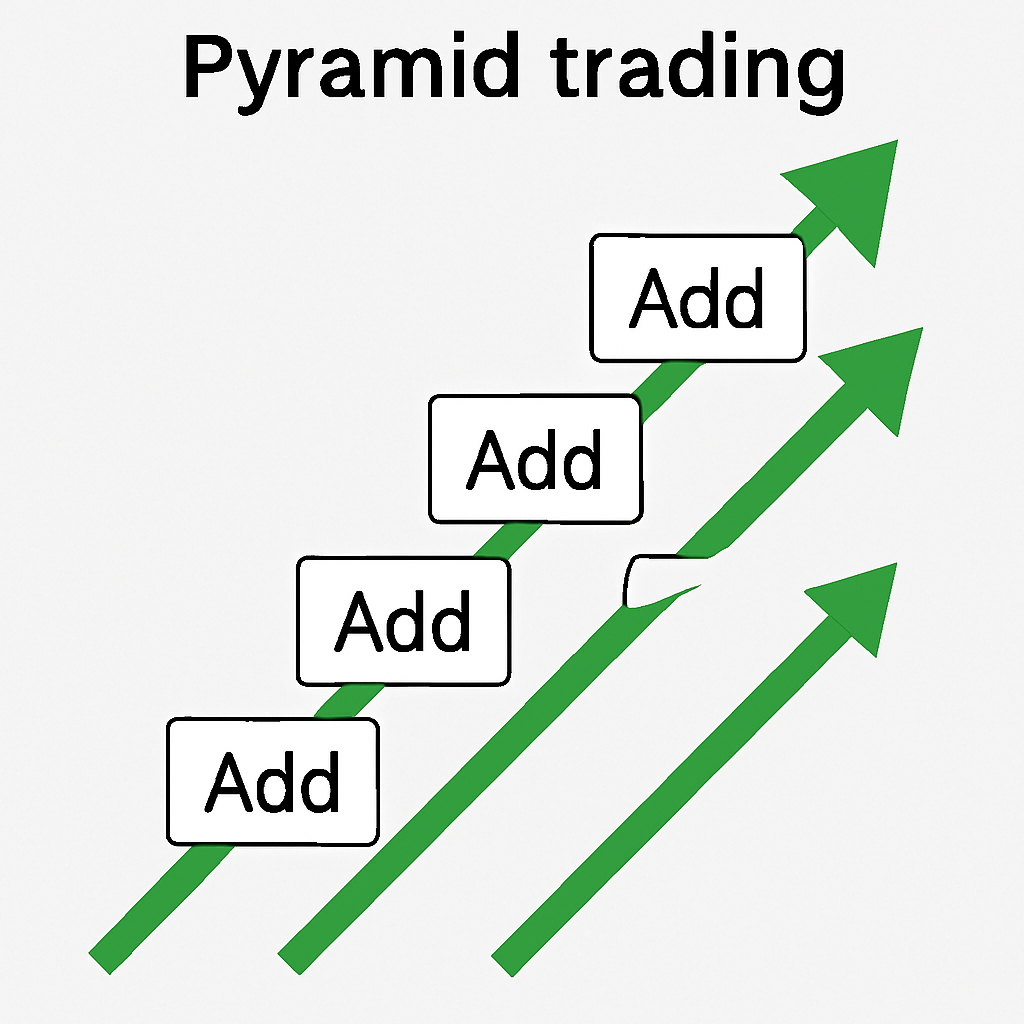
- Visual summary of pyramid trading

Overview
- Type: Trend-following strategy
- Mechanism: Add to winning trades at breakout levels
- Risk: Controlled exposure
- Markets: Forex, Equities, Commodities
- Related: Position sizing, Technical analysis

Pyramid trading, also known as pyramiding, is a trading strategy, which consists of adding to an existing trade or position as the price moves in the expected direction. Doing so reduces the risk levels of an investment, with traders using small increments to increase their holdings rather than betting big from the start.

Pyramiding is popular among investors who are willing to play it safe by investing only a fraction of their intended full position and then waiting for the market to move before deciding to increase their hold on those equities that turned a profit. The strategy may appear counter-intuitive initially, with each subsequent entry into the market costing the investor more money than the previous one. This, however, makes it easier to avoid losses in the long run if no new investments are made until the old ones turn a profit.

Pyramid trading should not be confused with either pyramid trading points, which are data-based means to determine when a trend is nearing exhaustion, or pyramid schemes, which are unsustainable, fraudulent and often illegal business models.
