= FxPro =

Online brokerage based in London

- Type: Private
- Industry: Finance
- Founded: 2002
- Headquarters: London, United Kingdom
- Number of employees: 300+
- Website: www.fxpro.com

FxPro is a London-based global online brokerage that provides contracts for difference (CFDs) in foreign exchange, stocks, futures, exchange-traded funds (ETFs), cryptocurrencies, and precious metals. It has offices in London, United Kingdom, Cyprus, UAE and The Bahamas, and is regulated by several regulatory authorities. FxPro serves over two million active retail and institutional client accounts in more than 170 countries.

== History ==
FxPro was founded in 2002 as a foreign exchange broker EuroOrient Securities & Financial Services Ltd in Cyprus. Following the introduction of the EU Markets in Financial Instruments Directive (MiFID) in 2004, companies regulated in Cyprus were permitted to provide investment services throughout the European Union. In 2010, FxPro was granted regulation and licensing by the UK Financial Conduct Authority (Financial Services Authority at the time) and opened its London office.

The company opened an office in Australia in 2011, but had to close it in March 2013 after new capital regulations came into force in Australia. The acquired clients were transferred to Cyprus and UK jurisdiction.

In 2013, FxPro launched the SuperTrader platform, which specializes in social trading. At the time of its launch, SuperTrader featured about 200 Forex traders, whose positions could be copied by other FxPro traders. Traders are picked and vetted by FxPro, based on factors such as their trading techniques, how profitable they have been, and how risky their trades were.

Since 2013, the company has offered retail algorithmic trading through its web-based strategy tool Quant, built for MT4. It enables users to design automated trading strategies with technical indicators through drag-and-drop interface, without the need for prior programming knowledge.

FxPro began its initial public offering (IPO) in 2015. However, one year later, in 2016, the company postponed its plans due to turmoil in global markets. In spring 2017, the plans were postponed again due to the new tough FCA measures.

In September 2021, FxPro invested $12 million in a new regional headquarters in The Bahamas.

In April 2022, FxPro opened an office in Dubai to support customers in the MENA region.

FxPro account types include MT4, MT5, cTrader, and FxPro Edge.

In June 2023, FxPro introduced cryptocurrency trading to its cTrader accounts. Some of the tokens currently supported on the platform are Bitcoin, Ethereum, and Ripple.

The company also grew its cash reserves from £2.6 million in 2022 to £3.6 million in 2023, expanding the total assets excluding liabilities by 4%.

== Regulations ==
FxPro UK Limited, a wholly owned subsidiary of FxPro Group Ltd, is licensed and fully regulated by the Financial Conduct Authority (FCA) in the United Kingdom. FxPro UK Limited formerly traded as an introducer for its parent company and did not provide brokerage services or hold client funds until June 2012, when the company updated its FCA license to accept UK clients.

FxPro Financial Services Limited is licensed and regulated by the Cyprus Securities and Exchange Commission (CySEC).

In 2015, FxPro received approval from the South African Financial Services Board (FSB).

== Sponsorships ==
=== Association football ===
In June 2010, the company announced a front of shirt sponsorship agreement with Premier League club Aston Villa, which would last for one season. They also began sponsoring Fulham that same season in an agreement that would last until 2013.

In March 2011, the company announced a sponsorship agreement with Ligue 1 club AS Monaco for the 2011-12 season. In June 2017, the company became the front of shirt sponsor for Premier League club Watford, in an agreement that lasted two seasons, ending in 2019.

=== Motorsport ===
FxPro first involved in motorsport by sponsoring the BWM Sauber F1 team in 2009, before moving on to Virgin Racing for their first season in 2010. After a break period, FxPro returned to Formula 1 in 2018 with a multi-year partnership with McLaren Racing, which would be extended in 2019 and 2021.

In 2010, FxPro announced a 2-year sponsorship agreement to become the Official Forex Trading Partner of the World Rally Championship.

FxPro were also the title sponsor for the Cyprus Rally for the 2009 (sanctioned by the World Rally Championship), 2010 and 2011 (sanctioned by the Intercontinental Rally Challenge) runnings of the event.

== See also ==
- Financial regulation in the United Kingdom
- Foreign exchange market
- List of electronic trading platforms
- MetaTrader 4
