= Copy trading =

Forex trading

Copy trading enables individuals in the financial markets to automatically copy positions opened and managed by other selected individuals.

Unlike mirror trading, a method that allows traders to copy specific strategies, copy trading links a portion of the copying trader's funds to the account of the copied investor. Any trading action made thenceforth by the copied investor, such as opening a position, assigning Stop Loss and Take Profit orders, or closing a position, are also executed in the copying trader's account according to the proportion between the copied investor's account and the copying trader's allotted copy trading funds.

The copying trader usually retains the ability to disconnect copied trades and manage them themselves. They can also close the copy relationship altogether, which closes all copied positions at the current market price. Copied investors, who are called leaders or signal providers, are often compensated by flat monthly subscription fees on the part of a trader, a signal follower, seeking to copy their trades. Apart from that, popular investors may earn up to 100% spread rebate on their personal transactions. The reward schemes serve to stimulate traders to allow others to monitor and copy their trades instead of trading privately.

Copy trading has led to the development of a new type of investment portfolio, which some industry insiders call "People-Based Portfolios" or "Signal Portfolios" (borrowing the terminology of the popular MetaQuotes Signal Marketplace). People-based portfolios differ from traditional investment portfolios in that the investment funds are invested in other investors, rather than traditional market-based instruments.

While followers do not pass capital into the accounts of the signal providers, the latter operate as portfolio managers de facto, as they have indirect control over a portion in the capital of the signal followers. Therefore, social trading networks provide an innovative framework for delegated portfolio management.

== History ==
Initially, some traders conveyed their intention to open or close specific operations at certain levels to their followers through newsletters. Later, the first trading room appeared with the same concept. A trader announced the execution of a transaction, writing it in a virtual room instead of using the email, and followers could read and reproduce the transaction. When the chat rooms grew, other traders could also comment or post questions online, which required a persistent presence in front of the screen and often paying a fee to use the platform.

At that level, some traders realized the potential benefits that an automatic replication system could produce if built. Around 2005, Copy trading and mirror trading developed from automated trading, also known as algorithmic trading. It was an automated trading system where traders were sharing their own trading history that others could follow. Tradency was one of the first to propose an autotrading system in 2005, called by them Mirror Trader. A trader could host their own trading strategy on the systems with the trading records showing the performance of that strategy. Other users could then decide to mirror-copy on their account all the transactions generated from that strategy.

This was soon followed in certain circumstances that allowed traders to connect their personal trading account directly in the platform, and from that moment each of their action was recorded and made available to the users without the need for submitting the trading strategy.

Since 2010, it has become an increasingly popular feature among online financial trading brokers as a way to enable less experienced traders to benefit from the trading decisions of investors whom they deem successful.

The majority of trades occur in very liquid markets, such as foreign exchange markets. Foreign exchange copy trading has been plagued by scams and regulators have tried to clean up this industry. This has caused most brokers to shut down their copy trading services. An example of this is FxPro that shut down their SuperTrader service in 2017.

In 2012 eToro received trademark for their CopyTrader system, which has representatives from over 140 countries and over 135,000 verified traders to copy.

=== Study ===
In 2012 MIT funded a study directed by Dr. Yaniv Altshuler, showed that traders on the eToro social investment network who benefited from "guided copying", i.e. copying a suggested investor, fared 6-10% better than traders who were trading manually, and 4% better than traders who were copy trading random investors of their choice.

As of 2013, Dr. Altshuler has been collaborating with Professor Alex "Sandy" Pentland of MIT on a study that aims to find a "sustainable" social trading mechanism in the aim of fine tuning traders' ability to benefit from copy trading. The research also found that followed traders are frequently, but not consistently, the most effective.

In conventional investment decision making, imitation has been also shown to play a significant role.

In 2014, Mauro Martino from Watson research center of IBM Research, and Altshuler collaborated with Yang-Yu Liu, Jose C. Nacher and Tomoshiro Ochiai on a financial trading study that showed that copied trades are more likely than standard trades to produce positive returns, but the return on investment of profitable copy trades is lower than the return of successful regular trades.

In 2018, professor Matthias Pelster of Paderborn University and Annette Hofmann of St. John's University discovered that losses are usually higher for copied trades in the event of negative returns. They also suggested that investors who are copied by other investors were more likely to suffer from a disposition effect.

In 2019, Gortner and van der Weele were researching Arrow-Debreu securities double auctions experimentally with and without peer data. They concluded that observing other traders' portfolios results in traders buying less volatile portfolios. However, when traders are rated by their performance, this influence is neutralized.

Copy trading may however also have potentially adverse effects for investors. A 2020 experimental study argues that merely providing information on the success of others may lead to a significant increase in risk taking. This increase in risk taking may even be larger when subjects are provided with the option to directly copy others. From this perspective, copy trading may lead to excessive risk taking.

== Influence on behavior ==
Copy-trading platforms can influence behavior in a variety of ways. Their key institutional features encourage imitation both indirectly and directly: indirectly by providing portfolio information and others' performance that users can try to replicate on their own, and directly by enabling investors to copy others directly with the click of a button. As a result, copy-trading websites have an institutionalized imitation environment in which to operate.

In a different context, as Theo Offerman and Andrew Schotter (2009) pointed out, when the payoffs are large, imitation can lead subjects to make risky decisions. In the context of a financial market, where asset prices are generally volatile, imitation can have particularly significant consequences. High returns in copy trading may be associated with high risk taking on the part of the replicated investors. As a result, efficient investors may have not only been lucky, but they may also have taken more risks. As a result, copiers may be more likely to pursue risky investment strategies. Copy trading can also lead to excessive risk-taking and non-optimal outcomes, both personally and socially.

Pompeu Fabra University, Heidelberg University, and the University of Essex Colchester were the first to openly study copy trading in an experimental setting. They investigated the concept of who chooses to become a copier and discovered that risk aversion is a deciding factor. The higher the subjects' risk aversion, the more likely they are to imitate others. Those who have demonstrated a low risk tolerance are tempted to take more risk by copy trading.

Jacob Goeree and Leeat Yariv (2015) and John Duffy (2019) demonstrate in the context of social learning studies that a significant portion of subjects have a strong desire to follow others, even when there is no performance data. Other researches also indicated that lack of trust is one of the most significant barriers inhibiting online trade, and that trust signals play important roles in overcoming these barriers. Members of communities who proactively signal their trustworthiness online have a powerful influence over the behavior of other members. So that, the credibility of online community members is crucial in the setting of online and copy trading, as in other online communities such trust-based decision making is uncommon.

=== Regulation ===
FCA adopts the view set out in the European Securities and Markets Authority's (ESMA) MiFID Questions and Answers: Investor Protection & Intermediaries (Question #9) on how copy and mirror trading function under the MiFID Directive. It regards them as an automatic execution of trade signals where no manual input from the account holder. This implies standard regulatory obligations for authorized management.

In 2014, the United Kingdom Financial Conduct Authority (FCA) has raised concerns regarding copy trading as they deem the firms offer copy trading to be effectively unregulated investment managers. As such, the FCA has sent letters to those companies providing copy trading services notifying them of their intention to classify them as portfolio or investment managers.

==== Methods used ====
Different copy trading platforms employ different copy trading logic. These usually vary in regards to the minimum copy trading amounts, the minimum amount for a copied trade, and the way money in/out operations on behalf of the copied trader are reflected in the proportions between the copied-copying accounts. All trades are proportional to one's budget—that is, if a copied investor spends 1% of their portfolio, copiers also do so.

Some platforms also enable traders to place Stop Loss orders on the entire copy trading relationship, allowing traders to control the risk of their copy trading activity based on the individual copied investors. The primary driving factor for investors to imitate a previous investor's financial decisions is their level of risk aversion. The lower the risk tolerance, the greater the likelihood of copying.

==== Compared to social trading ====
Various financial trading operators offer copy trading capabilities as part of a larger social trading platform. Social trading usually includes the ability to connect with other investors using the platform in social ways (comments, likes, link sharing etc.) as well as find potential copy trading candidates by viewing investors' performance statistics.
