= Single-dealer platform =

Financial software

A single-dealer platform (SDP) is software used by an investment bank dealing in the capital markets to deliver trading and associated services via the web. The function of an SDP is to integrate pricing, liquidity, and information from multiple sources within a bank and provide access to them via a single user interface. It is thus both an integration platform and a delivery platform.

Although the term SDP is sometimes used to describe an entire electronic trading suite, it properly refers to the integration and connectivity layer that sits on top of trading, pricing, risk management and other back-end systems.

A key aspect of an SDP is that it merges information and services both within and across asset classes. An SDP will typically combine elements such as pricing, trading, research and technical analysis within each asset class, and then draw together multiple asset classes.

Although in principle SDPs are applicable to all types of tradable security, they have so far been most widely used in OTC markets such as foreign exchange and fixed income.

Single-dealer platforms should not be confused with single-dealer portals. A single-dealer portal is a stand-alone service provided by a bank for trading a specific set of products in one asset class, and is usually narrow in scope. A single-dealer platform, by contrast, is a broad layer of software that allows a bank to offer integrated information and trading across most or all of its businesses.

Single-dealer platforms are sometimes also referred to as "single bank platforms". The terms are usually interchangeable.

== History ==
Starting in the early 1990s, the gradual replacement of voice trading by electronic trading in the OTC markets created a requirement for banks to provide screen-based trading services to their clients. This was frequently achieved via intermediaries, known as multi-dealer platforms (MDPs), that were formed to deliver pricing and trading from multiple banks.

Early on, however, banks such as Morgan Stanley, Credit Suisse, Barclays Capital and Deutsche began offering single-dealer portals, mostly either via private pages on Bloomberg or via the Internet. Offerings of this kind enjoyed rapid success, and by 2005, despite vigorous competition from multi-dealer platforms, surveys showed the majority of clients relying on single-dealer rather than multi-dealer offerings.

Initially, most of these single-dealer offerings took the form of stand-alone trading screens that offered trading in just one family of instruments. Many banks developed a large number of such "point solutions," often having nothing more than branding in common. Since the mid-2000s, however, users of such systems have been expressing a need for multiple asset classes to be tradable through a single platform, rather than having to log into many services.

Banks responded to this need by embracing the SDP concept and starting to build more integrated, multi-asset offerings. In the absence of any established frameworks, early SDPs were usually built in an ad hoc fashion, often using Java applets to deliver a user interface via the Web. By the end of the decade the use of Java applets started to decline sharply, in favor of rich Internet application (RIA) technologies such as native web applications, Flash and Silverlight.

=== 2012 and onwards ===
HTML5 has become the technology of choice for SDPs from 2012 when vendors such as Microsoft and Adobe Systems, who previously promoted their own technologies, moved to support the new standard.

It has become usual for banks to employ a general-purpose SDP framework as a starting point. Such frameworks reduced cost and time to delivery, while still allowing a high degree of differentiation. As a result, few institutions now choose a custom-build strategy.

SDPs become a major trading channel in the foreign exchange markets, and continue to gain ground in other asset classes.

Name	Owner
Neo	UBS
JX	Jane Street
Autobahn	Deutsche Bank
Marquee	Goldman Sachs
BBVA Trader	BBVA
Velocity	Citi
Cortex	BNP Paribas
Execute	JP Morgan Chase
Arena	Lloyds Banking Group
Barx	Barclays
Jetstream	Credit Agricole CIB
SG-Markets	Societe Generale
Matrix	Morgan Stanley
Standard Chartered Markets	Standard Chartered

== See also ==
- Electronic trading platform
- Electronic trading
- Electronic communication network
- Retail forex platform
- Stock market data systems
- Straight-through processing
- Trading system
- Trading room
