= Forex signal =

Suggested currency trade

A forex signal is a suggestion for entering a trade on a currency pair, usually at a specific price and time. The signal is generated either by a human analyst or an automated forex robot supplied to a subscriber of the forex signal service. Due to the timely nature of signals, they are usually communicated via email, website, SMS, RSS, tweet or other relatively immediate method. In many jurisdictions signal services need to be registered with the authorities.

== Types of services ==
Services provided fall into four categories:

1. Unpaid/free signals
2. Paid signals from one provider whether by personal analysis or algorithmic analysis
3. Paid signals aggregated from multiple signal sources or 'systems'
4. Signals supplied by trading software located on the trader's computer, also known as a forex robot or EA (Expert Advisor)

== Typical features offered by Forex signal service providers ==
The main services offered by forex signal suppliers are:

- Exact or approximate entry, exit and stop loss figures for trades on one or more currency pairs
- Supporting graphs and/or analysis for the signals
- A trading history showing the number of pips profit/loss per month and/or the risk/reward ratio and actual trades. Sometimes (especially in the case of forex robots) this may be shown as back-tested results
- One-on-one coaching, or additional interaction with the signal provider such as comments, forum, etc.
- Account management whereby a subscriber's account can be traded by the signal provider
- Educational resources either via the internet or phone
- A trial period for a lesser price

Although these are the main features of a signal supplier, not all of them offer the complete list of services.

== Scams and fraudulent activity ==
As forex is popularly touted as a get-rich-quick method there are a number of services that supply signals of debatable quality, which do not answer the users' expectations for profits.

== Methodologies and trading strategies ==
The majority of signal providers focus on supplying signals based on technical analysis and a minority work on fundamental analysis or price action. Technical analysis, such as ichimoku and candlestick charting, show both short and long term price trends giving the signal provider flexibility in supplying a range of trade options. Fundamental analysis gives longer term trade ideas. Price action gives extremely short term trade ideas, often more suited to scalping.

== See also ==
- Foreign exchange autotrading
- Foreign exchange controls
- Foreign exchange hedge
- Foreign exchange reserves
