= Percent allocation management module =

Financial software application

A percent allocation management module, commonly known as PAMM, also sometimes referred to as percent allocation money management, describes a software application used predominantly by foreign exchange (forex) brokers to allow their clients to attach money to a specific trader managing one or more accounts appointed on the basis of a limited power of attorney. PAMM solution allows the trader on one trading platform to manage simultaneously unlimited quantity of managed accounts. Depending on the size of the deposit, each managed account has its own ratio in PAMM. Trader's activity results (trades, profit and loss) are allocated between managed accounts according to the ratio.

Because currency trading and other forms of arbitrage achieve profitability within very narrow margins, typically, a PAMM system allows more money to be brought into play while distributing the risk of one trader across (usually) multiple investors.

== Example ==
Assume that there are 3 managed accounts under trader's management:

1. USD account with deposit of $100,000 and ratio 9.3%

2. EUR account with deposit of €400,000 and ratio 49.5%

3. GBP account with deposit of £300,000 and ratio 41.2%

Depending on funded amounts, different ratios are applied for managed account (for ratio calculation all amounts are converted in USD equivalent based on market rate). In case if, for example, a trader (money manager) decides to buy 10 million EURUSD, PAMM allocates the order between managed accounts according to its ratio. Each managed account has its own part of position and corresponding profit and loss. In current example, the first managed account will get position LONG 930,000 EUR/USD, the second - LONG 4,950,000 EUR/USD and the third - LONG 4,120,000 EUR/USD. Resulting profit & loss will be automatically calculated for each account depending on market prices.

== Overview ==
The percent allocation management module is a form of piggybacking a large investor's money onto the smaller account of a trader. The trader's own money remains at risk, which theoretically reduces the chance of irresponsible management of the combined funds. PAMM is actually a more advanced descendant of "LAMM", which is a "lot allocation management module". In a LAMM trading system, if the trader buys one standard lot of a currency, each of the customers' accounts will also be increased with a standard lot of the currency, regardless of the relative size of the customer's account. This makes sense for accounts where the customer's assets are about the same size as the trader's, but it makes less sense when the customer's portfolio is much larger than the trader's. Thus, PAMM was developed as an alternative to LAMM. Alpari launched the PAMM service in 2008.

Depending on currency with which the customer has funded their own account, the ratio calculation of each customer's share is typically converted to United States dollar amounts. This facilitates a more streamlined investor-trader relationship.

== Money allocation for traders and investors ==
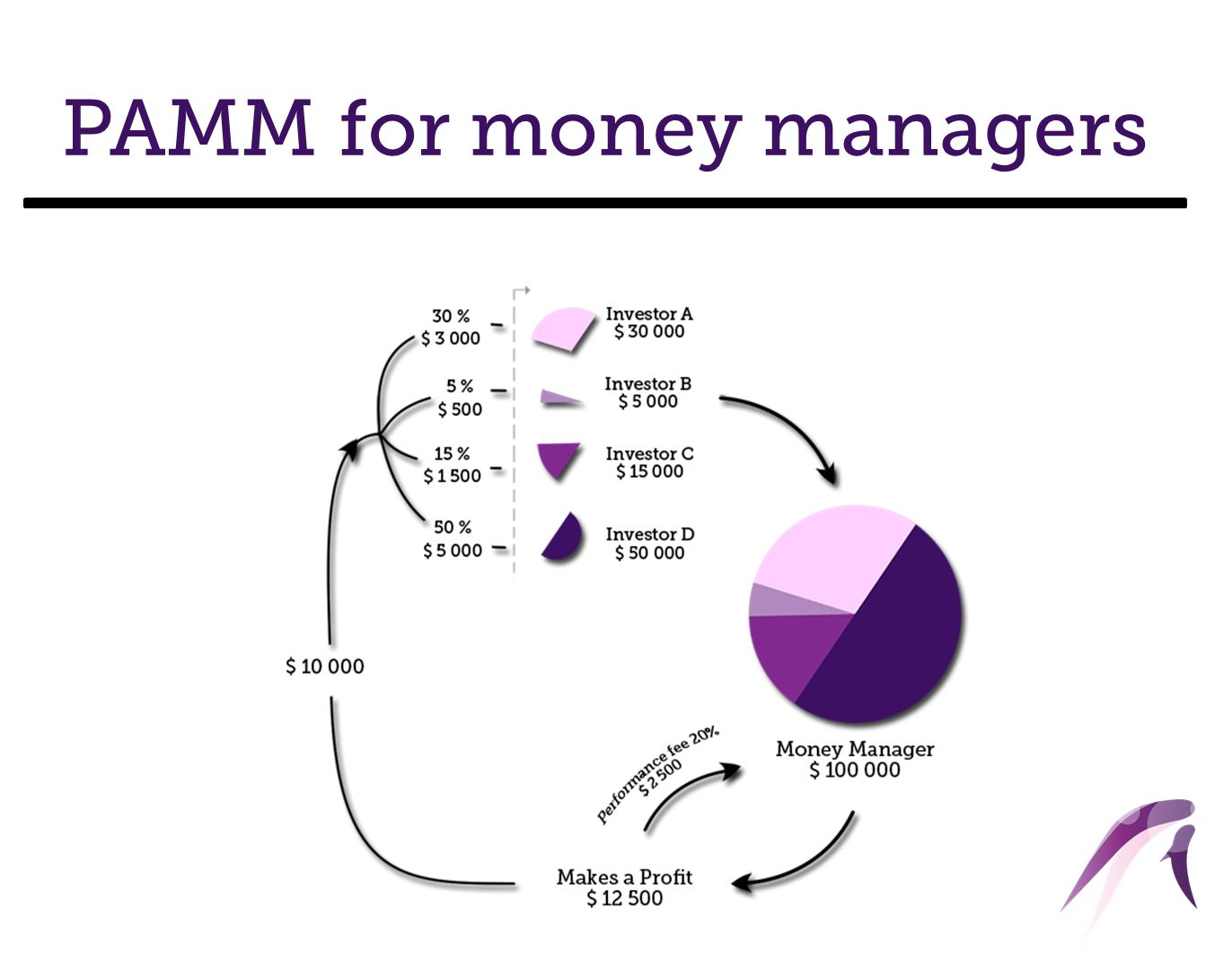
PAMM allocation

In this infographic example, there are four investors, each with a different amount of risk capital that choose the same money manager. The money manager trades the entire capital, $100,000 total, on one master account (the money manager can only trade the accounts; no access to the investor's funds is permitted to withdraw funds). The money manager then makes a profit of $12,500, and because in this example the commission fee is 20%, that equals to $2,500 in commissions for the money manager. This leaves $110,000 in the master account. The $10,000 profit made will now be credited back to the investors accounts based on the percentage of their share of risk capital in the pool.
