= Pyramiding (tax evasion) =

Pyramiding is a practice in which an employer that withholds payroll taxes from its employees intentionally fails to remit those withholdings to the taxing authority. Businesses that engage in pyramiding often file for bankruptcy to discharge the tax liabilities and start anew under a new name and perpetuating the same scheme. In the United States, employers may face federal as well as state criminal penalties for engaging in pyramiding. Pyramiding is one of the more common forms of employment tax evasion.

The term "pyramiding" refers to the accumulation of tax liability from each successive failure to remit payments. Another term for a business that engages in pyramiding is an "in-business repeater".
