= Leeat Yariv =

Israeli and American economist

- ליאת יריב

Academic background
- Education: Harvard University (PhD); Tel Aviv University (MS); Tel Aviv University (BS)

Academic work
- Discipline: Economics
- Institutions: Princeton University
- Awards: School of Mathematics’ teaching award, Tel-Aviv University (1994) UCLA Academic Senate Awards (2002-2005) American Economic Journal: Microeconomics Best Paper Award (2018)

Leeat Yariv (Hebrew: ליאת יריב) is the Uwe E. Reinhardt Professor of Economics at Princeton University, a research fellow of CEPR, and a research associate of NBER. She received her Ph.D. from Harvard University and held positions at UCLA and Caltech prior to her move to Princeton in 2017, where she is the founder and director of the Princeton Experimental Laboratory for the Social Sciences (PExL). Yariv's research focuses on political economy, market design, social and economic networks, and experimental economics.

Yariv was the lead editor of the American Economic Journal: Microeconomics from 2020 to 2022., and now serves as co-editor of Econometrica. She has also served on various journal editorial boards, including the American Economic Review, Econometrica, Games and Economic Behavior, Journal of Economic Literature, and Quantitative Economics.

Yariv is a fellow of the Econometric Society and the Society for the Advancement of Economic Theory, and she was elected as a member of the American Academy of Arts and Sciences in 2020.

== Education ==
Yariv received a B.Sc. in mathematics and a B.Sc. in physics from Tel Aviv University in 1992. In 1995, she received an M.Sc. in pure mathematics from Tel Aviv University. She received an M.A. and a Ph.D. in economics from Harvard University in 2001.

== Academic appointments ==
From 2001 to 2002, Yariv was appointed as a visiting assistant professor and postdoctoral fellow at Yale University in their Department of Economics and Cowles Foundation. Later, from 2004 to 2005, she continued as a visiting assistant professor at Caltech in their Division of Humanities and Social Sciences. After, she spent the fall of 2008 as a visiting scholar in New York University's Department of Economics. In 2014, she was appointed as director of Caltech's Social Science Laboratory (SSEL) until 2017. From 2015 to 2016 returned to Yale University where she was a visiting professor in the Cowles Foundation. From fall of 2016 to 2017, she started her career at Princeton University as a visiting professor in their Department of Economics. In 2018, she continued her career at Princeton University as director for the Princeton Experimental Laboratory for the Social Sciences (PExL) where she works presently.

== Publications ==
Yariv has co-authored numerous articles in journals such as The American Economic Review, Theoretical Economics, the Journal of Political Economy, and Econometrica. Written jointly with Allesandro Lizzeri, her paper "Collective Self Control" received the American Economic Journal's Best Paper Award for Microeconomics in 2018. She also wrote a chapter, "The Interplay Between Theory and Experiments," in the Handbook of Experimental Economic Methodology, as well as co-authored chapters in Online and Matching-Based Market Design and the Handbook of Social Economics.
