= Order flow trading =

Trading strategy

Order Flow Trading is a financial markets trading strategy focused on the orders that participants have, and will, enter into the order book. Other popular forms of market/trading analysis include technical analysis, sentiment analysis and fundamental analysis.

To earn a profit via trading one must enter a position in advance of a price change, hold through that price change, and exit once the move is completed. Since price change is the result of participant order activity, order flow traders analyze order flow in an effort to predict when and in which direction the next exploitable change in price will occur. This is done by watching the order book and also footprint charts. Order flow analysis allows traders to see what type of orders are being placed at a certain time in the market, e.g. the amount of Buy and Sell orders at a given price point. Traders can use Order Flow analysis to see the subsequent impact on the price of the market by these orders and therefore make predictions on the future price and direction of the market. Order flow trading is a type of short term trading strategy as it is used to enter the market accurately based on recent executed buy and sell orders. Order Flow Trading is sometimes referred to as a form of volume trading.

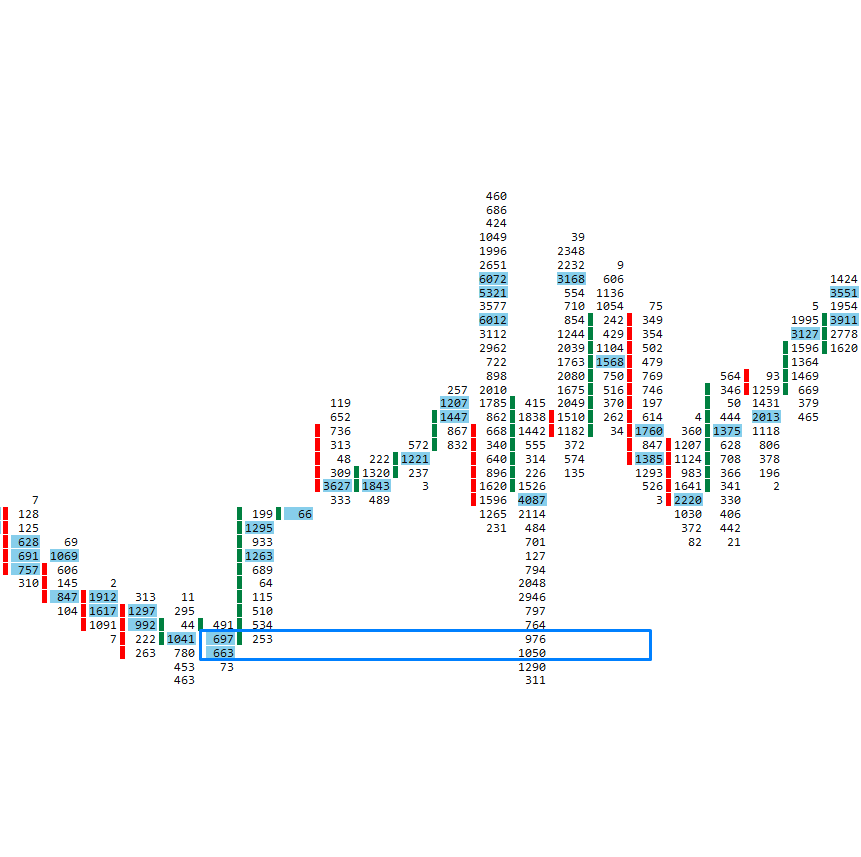
Footprint chart showing trend and reversals

== Reading Footprint candles ==
The numbers on the left hand side of a footprint candle show the volume/amount of sell orders executed, the numbers on the right side of a footprint candle show the volume/amount of buy orders executed, footprint candles are read diagonally up, and to the right. E.g. a sell order on the left hand side is compared with a buy order one tick up, diagonally to the right of it.

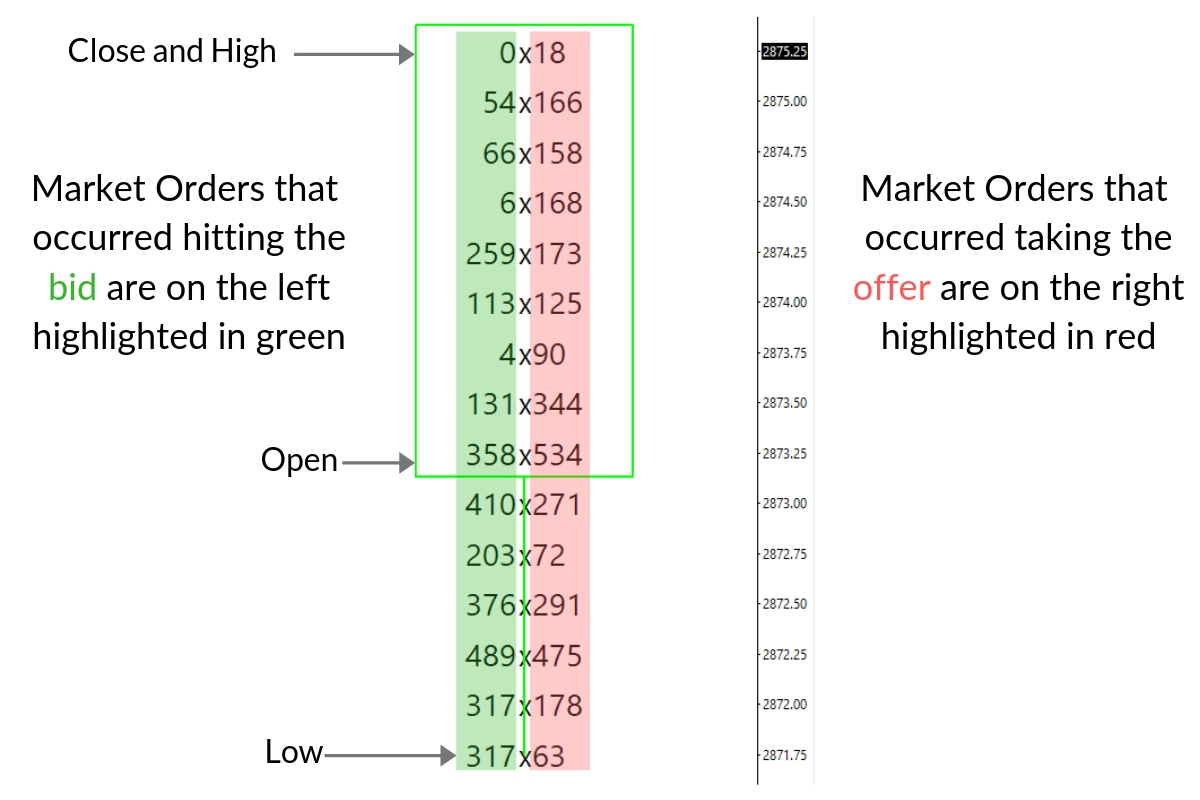
Footprint candle

== Order flow analysis generally shows the following ==
- Large buy or sell orders being executed
- who is in control, buyers or sellers
- volume
- VPOC: (volume point of control) the point at which the traded volume is the highest in the candle
- how big each buy or sell order is
- limit orders, available on DOM (depth of market) or the order book

Order flow analysis shows the volume of buyers and sellers at a specific price point and time. It can also reveal the accumulation of orders waiting to be executed at different price levels. While candlestick charts show this more broadly by individual "candlesticks, order books and footprint charts display individual buy and sell orders within each candlestick, offering a deeper view of micro price movements. Order flow traders can see both limit orders and market orders being placed, but footprint charts show only executed market orders and therefore show the actual volume of buyers and sellers. Limit orders are how traders place instructions to buy or sell a stock at a specific price or better; they are executed only if the market price reaches the specified level. These orders are not visible on candlestick charts but can be seen in the order book. Once executed, they become market orders and are then shown on the chart.

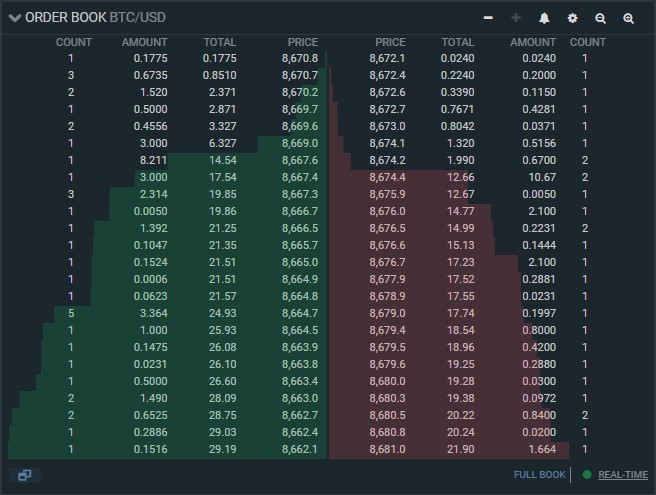
Order Book/ Depth of Market

Order flow traders can identify support and resistance levels by analyzing the size of buy and sell orders. On footprint charts, these appear as buy and sell imbalances. A buy imbalance, where the number of buyers exceeds the number of sellers at a given price, may indicate a potential support level. In contrast, a sell imbalance, with more sellers than buyers, can signal resistance. The distribution of buyer and seller volume is also used to detect possible trend reversals, a method commonly applied in footprint chart analysis.

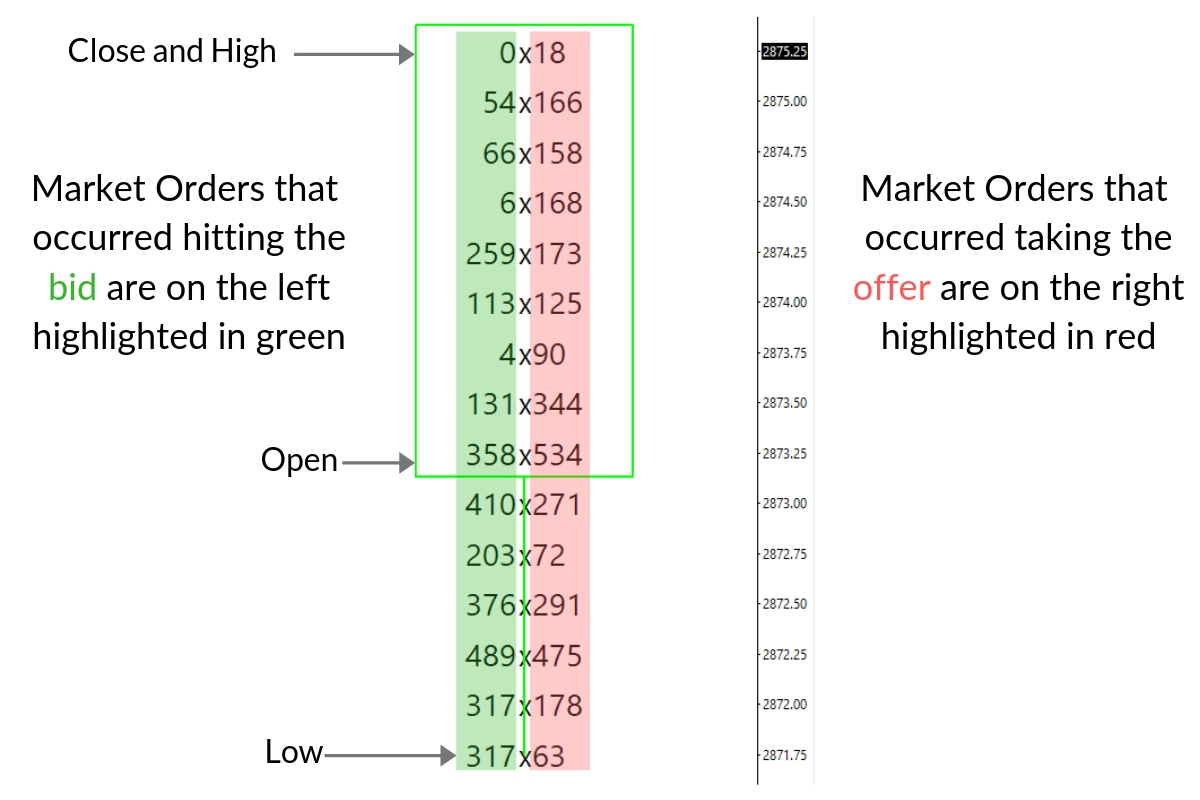
Shows the Individual buy and sell orders executed at each price

== Spoof Orders ==
Spoof orders or spoofing are when orders are placed at certain price points and then cancelled just before their execution. They are used to deceive other traders into analysing false support and resistance levels.
