= MetaTrader 4 =

Electronic trading software

- Developer: Metaquotes Software Corp.
- Operating system: Windows, Android, iOS
- Type: Trading platform, Technical analysis software
- License: Metaquotes Software Corp.
- Website: www.metaquotes.net/en/metatrader4

MetaTrader 4, also known as MT4, is an electronic trading platform widely used by online retail foreign exchange speculative traders. It was developed by MetaQuotes Software and released in 2005. The software is licensed to foreign exchange brokers who provide the software to their clients. The software consists of both a client and server component. The server component is run by the broker and the client software is provided to the broker's customers, who use it to see live streaming prices and charts, to place orders, and to manage their accounts.

The client is a Microsoft Windows-based application that became popular mainly due to the ability for end users to write their own trading scripts and robots that could automate trading. In 2010, MetaQuotes released a successor, MetaTrader 5. However, uptake was slow and as of April 2013 most brokers still used MT4. While there is no official MetaTrader 4 version available for Mac OS, some brokers provide their own custom developed MT4 variants for Mac OS.

Metatrader is also available for mobile and supports Android, iOS and Windows mobile

== History ==
Its developer, MetaQuotes Software, had previously released a number of versions of the MetaTrader platform starting in 2002. MetaTrader 4 was a significantly enhanced version and was released in 2005.

Between 2007 and 2010, many brokerages began offering the MT4 platform as an alternative to their own trading software because it was popular with traders and supported many third-party scripts and advisors.

In October 2009, a significantly re-coded MetaTrader 5 went into public beta testing. The first MT5 live account was launched by InstaForex in September 2010. In 2013 and 2014, the MQL4 programming language was completely revised eventually reaching the level of MQL5. Starting from build 600, MQL4 and MQL5 use unified MetaEditor.

Although MT5 was introduced in 2009, according to a study conducted in September 2019, MetaTrader 4 was still the most popular Forex trading platform in the world at the time.

On September 24, 2022, it was reported that MetaTrader 4 and MetaTrader 5 platforms had been removed from Apple's App Store but was still available on the Android Play Store. While it was alleged that the removal was connected to the international sanctions on Russia, where MetaQuotes originates, the company's representative stated that the removal was due to non-compliance with the App Store Review Guidelines.

Later, on March 6, 2023, after the company made changes to the app, both MT4 and MT5 iOS apps were back to App Store.

== Functionality ==
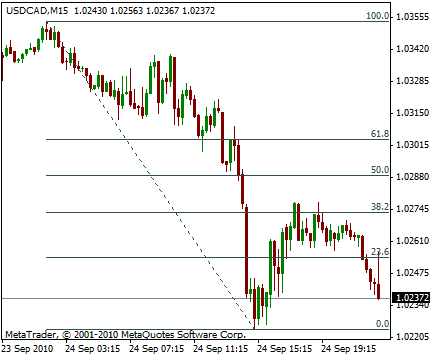
A chart from the MT4 trading screen

The client terminal includes a built-in editor and compiler with access to a user contributed free library of software, articles and help. The software uses a proprietary scripting language, MQL4/MQL5, which enables traders to develop Expert Advisors, custom indicators and scripts. MetaTrader's popularity largely stems from its support of algorithmic trading.

Yahoo! hosts a large group (over 12,000 members) devoted to development of free open source software for MetaTrader.

MT4 is designed to be used as a stand-alone system with the broker manually managing their position and this is a common configuration used by brokers. However, a number of third-party developers have written software bridges enabling integration with other financial trading systems for automatic hedging of positions. In late 2012 and early 2013, MetaQuotes Software began to work towards removing third-party plugins for its software from the market, suing and warning developers and brokers.

MetaTrader provide two types of trading orders, Pending Orders and Market Orders. Pending orders will be executed only when the price reaches a predefined level, whereas Market orders can be executed in one of the four modes: Instant execution, Request execution, Market execution, and Exchange execution. With Instant execution, the order will be executed at the price displayed in the platform. Its advantage is that the order will be executed at a known price. However, a good trading opportunity can be missed when the volatility is high and the requested price cannot be served. Request execution mode enables trader to execute a Market order in two steps — first, a price quote is requested, then, a trader decides whether to buy or sell using the received price. A trader has several seconds to decide if the received price is worth trading. Such mode offers a certain knowledge of price combined with guaranteed execution at that price. The tradeoff is the reduced speed of execution, which can take a lot longer than other modes. With Market execution, the orders will be executed with broker's price even if it is different from that displayed in the platform. The advantage of this mode is that it allows trading without any sort of requotes. However, deviation can get considerable during volatile price changes. In Exchange execution mode, the order is processed by the external execution facility (the exchange). The trade is executed according to the current depth of market.

== Components ==
The complete MetaTrader 4 package includes the following components:

- MetaTrader 4 Client Terminal - the client part. Provided free by brokerages for real-time online trading and as Demo (practice trading) accounts. This provides trade operations, charts and technical analysis in real time. The internal C-like programming language allows users to program trading strategies, indicators and signals. 50 basic indicators are included, each of which can be further customized. The software runs on Windows 98/2000/XP/Vista/7. Some users have reported success using Wine on Linux for the client terminal and on Mac using WineBottler.
- MetaTrader 4 Mobile - controls a trading account via mobile devices such as mobile phones or PDAs. Runs on Windows Pocket PC 2002/Mobile 2003, iOS, and Android.
- MetaTrader 4 Server - the core of the system, the server part. Designed to handle user requests to perform trade operations, display and execution of warrants. Also, sends price quotes and news broadcasts, records and maintains archives. Works as a service. Does not have a separate interface.
- MetaTrader 4 Administrator - is designed to remotely manage the server settings.
- MetaTrader 4 Manager - designed to handle trade inquiries and manage customer accounts.
- MetaTrader 4 Data Center - a specialized proxy server and can be an intermediary between the server and client terminals. It reduces the price quote sending load on the main server.

== Products ==
The platform is focused on margin trading. Some brokerages use MetaTrader 4 to trade CFD but it is not designed for full-time work in the stock market or exchange-traded futures. At the same time, MetaTrader 5 also works with equities and commodities exchange-traded commodities. Both MetaTrader 4 and 5 can use custom indicators and trading programs (called expert advisors) for trading automation.

== See also ==
- Straight-through processing
- Electronic communication network
- List of electronic trading platforms
