= Yaniv Altshuler =

Israeli computer scientist

- יניב אלטשולר
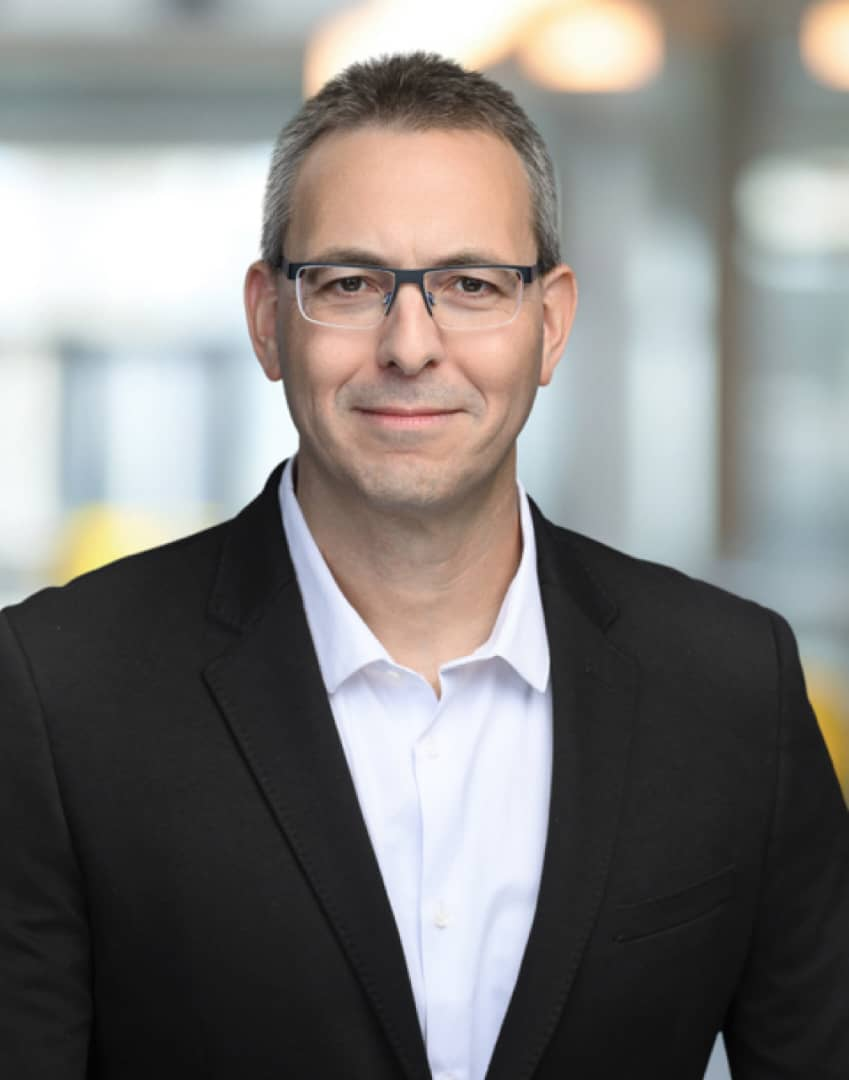
- Yaniv Altshuler
- Born: 1978 (age 47–48); Rishon Le Zion, Israel
- Citizenship: Israeli
- Education: MIT; Technion
- Known for: Social Physics, Swarm Intelligence, Information diffusion models in Social Networks
- Scientific career
- Workplaces: MIT, Technion
- Thesis: Multi-Agent Robotics in Dynamic Environments
- Doctoral advisor: Alfred Bruckstein and Israel Wagner

Yaniv Altshuler, (Hebrew: יניב אלטשולר; born 1978) is an entrepreneur and an MIT Artificial Intelligence researcher.

Together with MIT Prof. Alex Pentland, Altshuler is one of the creators of Social Physics a mathematical theory that describes statistical laws that model the behavior of human crowds, applicable in fields such as financial data analytics and homeland security.

Altshuler serves as Founder and CEO of Alphabiome.ai. Alphabiome uses advanced and proprietary AI-driven microbiome analytics technology to extract genetic biomarkers from microbial DNA at scale.

== Biography ==
Altshuler received his Ph.D. in computer science from the Technion in Israel, working with Prof. Alfred Bruckstein and Dr. Israel Wagner, focusing on the study of decentralized intelligence, such as the optimization of Drone Swarms.

Altshuler is also an alumnus of the Technion Rothschild Excellence program.

He spent 2011-2013 as a post-doctoral researcher at MIT focusing on the development of decentralized scalable AI algorithms and network intelligence. Together with Prof. Pentland he took part in the creation of the new science of Social Physics.

In 2014 Yaniv co-founded Endor, an MIT spinoff financially backed by former Google CEO Eric Schmidt, using Social Physics to offer advanced analytics capabilities in the fields of finance and homeland security.

Altshuler currently serves as the founder and CEO of Alphabiome.ai. Alphabiome’s technology is based on novel algorithms that use AI for deciphering the genetic code of microbiome samples. In addition to MIT Prof. Alex Pentland, the company’s scientific leadership includes Stanford Chemistry Nobel Laureate Prof. Roger Kornberg and Stanford Chemistry Nobel Laureate Prof. Michael Levitt.

== Scientific Work ==
Altshuler’s academic research has been focused on artificial intelligence and network theory.

Altshuler has published three books (Security and Privacy in Social Networks, Swarms and Network Intelligence in Search and Applied Swarm Intelligence, over 70 academic papers and 20 patents in the field of AI.

Altshuler was also the leading researcher in the “Stealing Reality” project that had shown how anonymized phone data can be used to accurately reveal personal information about the phone users, as well as the “Social Amplifier” project, that demonstrated the usage of real-time analysis of billions of phone calls for homeland security. This research was covered by AOL news, PC World, the Communications of the ACM, and other publications.

Altshuler was awarded the IEEE SocialCom Outstanding Leadership Award and was named a Technological Pioneer by the World Economic Forum in 2017.
