= Social trading =

Form of investing

Social trading is a form of investing that allows investors to observe the trading behavior of their peers and expert traders. The primary objective is to follow their investment strategies using copy trading or mirror trading. Social trading requires little or no knowledge about financial markets.

== History ==
One of the first social trading platforms was Collective2 which began offering a social trading functionality to retail traders as early as 2003 (preceding ZuluTrade by four years). In 2010, social trading started to achieve a greater degree of mainstream appeal with eToro, followed by Wikifolio in 2012. Europe-based NAGA, listed on Frankfurt Stock Exchange since 2017, claims more than EUR 27 billion was traded on its platform in the second half of 2019. Some of the other contemporary social trading platforms and tech providers are Trading Motion, Brokeree Solutions, iSystems, and FX Junction, among others.

=== Research ===
MIT Computer Scientist and researcher Yaniv Altshuler described social trading networks as complex adaptive systems, and in his 2014 research on eToro's OpenBook, wrote that "Having the inherent ability to share ideas and information between each others, OpenBook's users are given a new source of information they can use in order to enhance their trading performance. As the users are not playing against each other but rather – against the market, this situation becomes a non zero-sum game, hence incentivizing the users to share as much information as possible." His paper concludes that "social trading provides much better opportunities for profiting compared with individual trading," but that users make "excellent but sometimes not optimal decisions in selecting experts when they can see others' choices."

A 2015 World Economic Forum report described social trading networks as disruptors, which "have emerged to provide low-cost, sophisticated alternatives to traditional wealth managers. These solutions cater to a broader customer base and empower customers to have more control of their wealth management," and "pose a tangible threat to the traditional practices of the wealth management industry".

Economist Nouriel Roubini's thinktank predicted in 2016 that "newer forms of investment, such as socially responsible investments and social trading will bring some of the largest industry growth in the coming years."

A 2017 St. John's University study found that 'leader' traders, or those with followers, are more susceptible to the disposition effect than investors that are not being followed by any other traders, with the authors suggesting the observation may be explained by "leaders feeling responsible towards their followers and an urge to not let them down, by fear of losing followers when admitting a bad investment decision and signaling confidence in their initial investment choice, or by an attempt of newly appointed leaders to manage their self-image."

Social trading may potentially also change how much risk investors take. A recent experimental study argues that merely providing information on the success of others may lead to a significant increase in risk taking. This increase in risk taking may even be larger when subjects are provided with the option to directly copy others.

== Characteristics ==
Social trading is an alternative way of analyzing financial data by looking at what other traders are doing and comparing and copying their techniques and strategies. Prior to the advent of social trading, investors and traders were relying on fundamental or technical analysis to form their investment decisions. Using social trading investors and traders could integrate into their investment decision-process social indicators from trading data-feeds of other traders. Social trading platforms or networks can be considered a subcategory of social networking services.

Social trading allows traders to trade online with the help of others and some have claimed shortens the learning curve from novice to experienced trader. Traders can interact with others, watch others take trades, then duplicate their trades and learn what prompted the top performer to take a trade in the first place. By copying trades, traders can learn which strategies work and which do not work. Social trading is used to do speculation; in the moral context speculative practices are considered negatively and to be avoided by each individual. who conversely should maintain a long-term horizon avoiding any types of short term speculation.

Social Media has permeated the trading world such that two main types of trading has evolved:

Traditional Trades

- Single (or non-social) trade: Trader A places a normal trade by himself or herself; This can by manual or automated

Social Trading

There are two main types of social trading:

- Copy trade: Trader A places exactly the same trade as trader B's one single trade; (iii)
- Mirror trade: Trader A automatically executes trader B's every single trade, i.e., trader A follows exactly trader B's trading activities.

Other variations offered on some platforms allow users to copy another trader's portfolio (copy portfolio), and follow a trader's dividends (copy dividends), where whenever a followed trader withdraws money from his or her account, a proportional amount of money will be withdrawn from the balance of their follower, in real time.

=== Key features ===
- Information flow: Unencumbered access to information is important in financial markets and that makes the free exchange of information of interest to small scale as well as individual investors.
- Cooperative trading: Social trading offers traders the opportunity to work together in trading teams which can trade the markets collaboratively, whether by pooling funds, dividing research or through sharing information.
- Monetization: As with social networks in the broader sense, monetization strategies are not always clear. As with social networks in general, it is possible, however, that the long-term worth of such websites may come from the variety and depth of data about their users which their active communities are likely to generate.
- Transparency: Social trading platforms reveal traders' performance stats, open and past positions, and market sentiment, giving members complete information to assess the credibility of the contributors they follow on the platform.

== See also ==
- Algorithmic trading
- Trading strategy
