= EToro =

Multi-asset brokerage company

eToro Group Ltd.
- Type: Public
- Traded as: Nasdaq: ETOR
- Industry: Financial services Online trading Social trading
- Founded: 2007; 19 years ago
- Founders: Yoni Assia; Ronen Assia; David Ring
- Headquarters: Bnei Brak, Israel
- Area served: Worldwide
- Key people: Yoni Assia (chairman and CEO); Ronen Assia (executive director); Meron Shani (CFO); Hedva Ber (global COO and deputy CEO); Eddy Shalev (director)
- Products: Electronic trading platform, stocks, exchange-traded funds, CFDs, cryptoassets, copy trading, social trading, futures trading
- Services: Online brokerage, investment management, electronic trading platform
- Revenue: ▲US$13.838 billion in total revenue and income (2025)
- Operating income: 87,200,000 United States dollar (2020)
- Net income: ▲US$216 million (2025)
- Total assets: ▲US$1.791 billion (2025)
- Total equity: ▲US$1.395 billion (2025)
- Number of employees: 1,520 (2025)
- Website: www.etoro.com

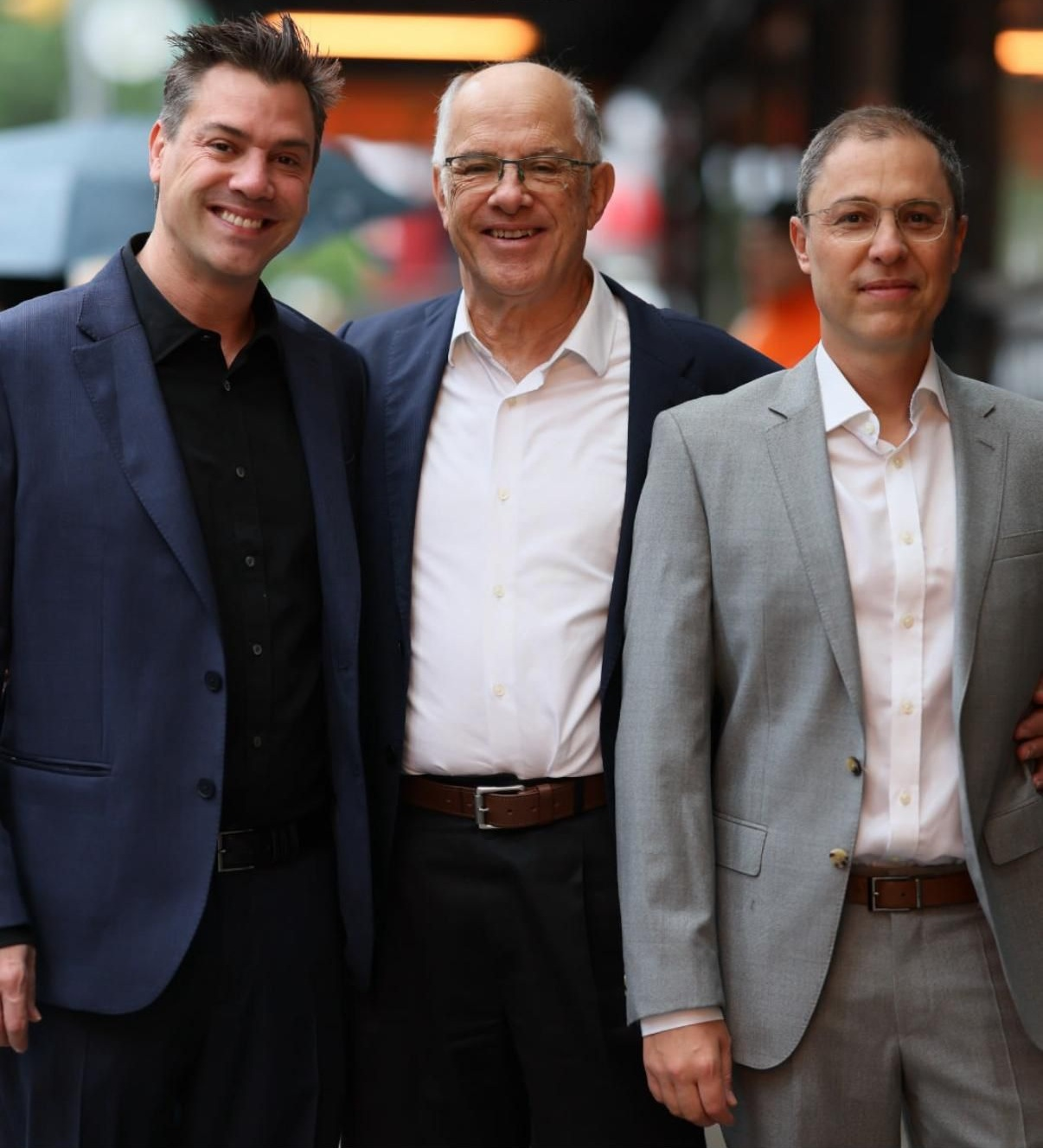
Yoni (left) and Ronen Assia, and their father, David Assia, former chairman of eToro

eToro Group Ltd. is an Israeli multinational company that operates an electronic trading platform and social trading system. The company is organized in the British Virgin Islands and headquartered in Bnei Brak, Israel.

eToro was founded in 2007 in Tel Aviv by Yoni Assia, Ronen Assia, and David Ring.

As of 31 December 2025, eToro had approximately 3.81 million funded accounts in 75 countries and $18.5 billion in customer assets under administration.

== History ==
eToro was founded as RetailFX in 2007 in Tel Aviv by brothers Yoni Assia and Ronen Assia together with David Ring. In 2010, the company launched eToro OpenBook, a social investment platform that included copy trading, allowing users to replicate the trading activity of other investors. Later that year, it released an Android app.

In 2013, eToro expanded its product range to include stock investments and CFDs alongside commodities and currencies. The same year, its UK subsidiary was authorized by the UK's Financial Conduct Authority. In 2014, eToro introduced Bitcoin trading and later added currency futures investments for the Russian ruble and Chinese yuan.

In 2017 and 2018, eToro expanded its cryptocurrency-related operations. In December 2017, it partnered with CoinDash to develop blockchain-based social trading, and in 2018 it opened a London trading desk for institutional clients interested in cryptoassets. The company also launched cryptocurrency wallets for Android and iOS in November 2018.

In 2019, eToro launched its cryptocurrency trading platform and standalone wallet for US users. The same year, it acquired Danish blockchain company Firmo and Belgian crypto portfolio tracking app Delta.

In 2020, eToro acquired Marq Millions, a UK e-money business, and rebranded it as eToro Money. It later launched the eToro Money debit card for UK residents. In 2021, the company reported having 20 million registered users in 140 countries.

In 2021, The Times of Israel covered eToro's connections with former Israeli financial regulators, including Shmuel Hauser, former chairman of the Israel Securities Authority, who joined eToro as an advisory board member. During Hauser's tenure at the ISA, proposed legislation aimed at Israel's binary options industry was modified in a way that allowed eToro to continue operating internationally, although eToro itself did not offer binary options. Hauser stepped down from the ISA in December 2017, more than a year before the end of his term, at a time when the regulator was involved in several high-profile anti-corruption investigations. Hedva Ber, former supervisor of banks at the Bank of Israel, was later appointed eToro's deputy CEO and global COO.

In October 2021, The Times of Israel reported that Nir Barkat, a Likud MK and former mayor of Jerusalem, had held shares in eToro through entities disclosed in the Pandora Papers. eToro was registered in the British Virgin Islands while most of its operations were based in Israel.

In July 2022, eToro laid off approximately 100 employees, or around 6% of its workforce. In August 2022, eToro acquired Gatsby, a fintech startup focused on options and stock trading. In October 2022, it acquired Lisbon-based portfolio management tools provider Bullsheet. In April 2023, eToro became a data partner for X's cashtags, supplying real-time prices for stocks, exchange-traded funds (ETFs), commodities and cryptocurrencies.

In 2024, eToro expanded market access through partnerships with the London Stock Exchange, Dubai Financial Market and Deutsche Börse, and acquired Australian investing app Spaceship in a deal worth up to A$80 million.

In May 2025, eToro completed its initial public offering on the Nasdaq under the ticker symbol ETOR. In April 2026, eToro acquired crypto wallet provider Zengo for approximately $70 million.

In August 2026, eToro agreed to acquire US brokerage TradeZero in a cash-and-stock deal worth up to $231 million.

=== Funding and public listing ===
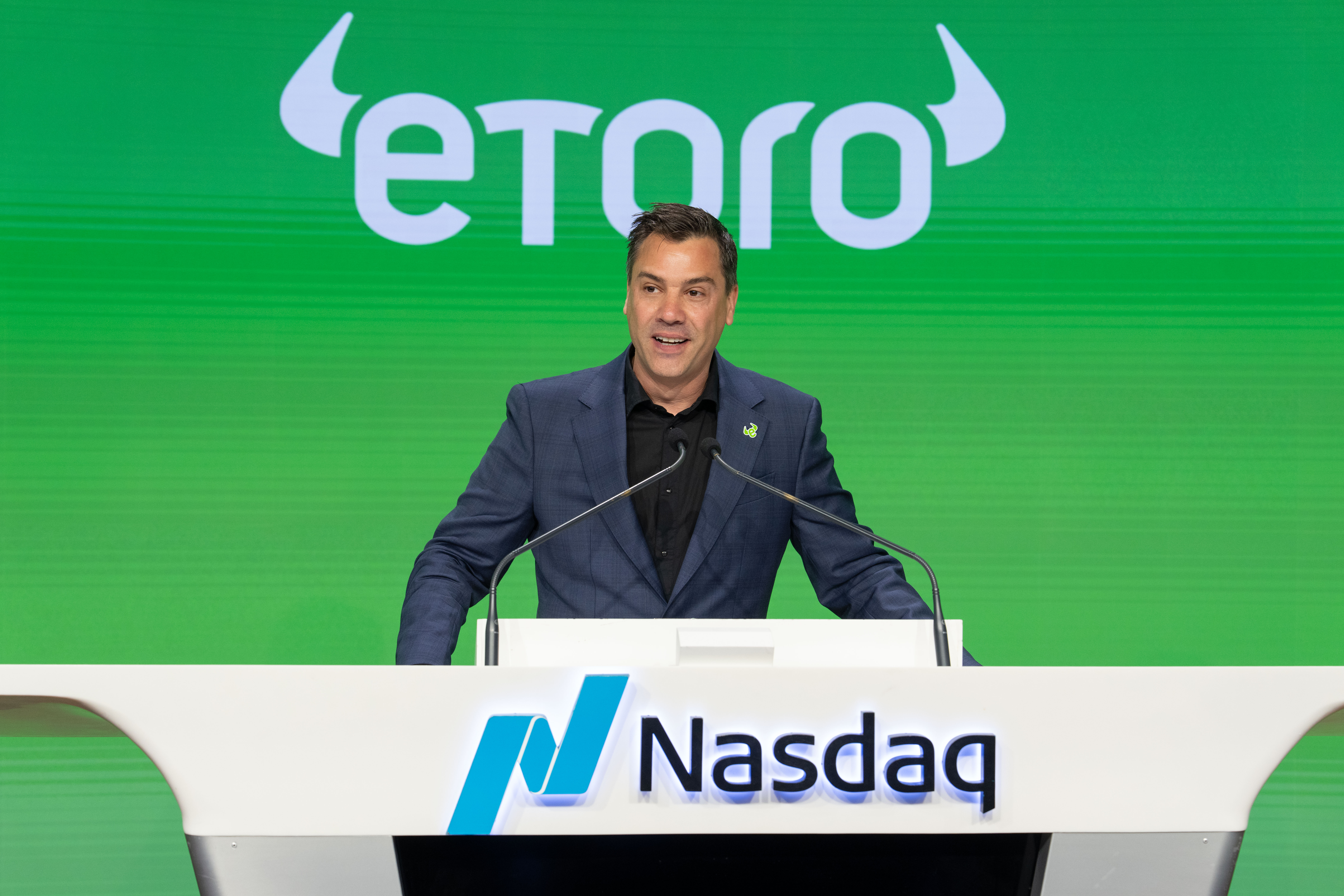
The founder of eToro, Yoni Assia, during the eToro IPO launch event at Nasdaq

Between 2007 and 2012, eToro raised several early venture rounds. In 2007, the company raised $1.7 million in series A funding from Cubit Investments, Chemi Peres, and other investors. In March 2009, it raised $6.3 million in a series B round from BRM Group, Cubit Investments, and others. In June 2010, eToro raised $2.4 million in a third funding round led by Social Leverage. In March 2012, the company raised $15 million in a round led by Spark Capital, with participation from existing investors BRM, Guy Gamzu and Jonathan Kolber.

The company later raised larger growth rounds as it expanded internationally. In December 2014, eToro raised $27 million from Ping An Insurance and SBT Venture Capital, along with a credit facility from Silicon Valley Bank. In March 2018, it raised $100 million at an $800 million valuation in a round led by China Minsheng Financial, with participation from SBI Group, Korea Investment Partners and other investors.

In March 2021, eToro agreed to merge with FinTech Acquisition Corp. V, a special-purpose acquisition company backed by former Bancorp CEO Betsy Z. Cohen, in a transaction that valued eToro at about $10.4 billion. In December 2021, the terms were amended, lowering eToro's valuation to $8.8 billion and extending the deadline to complete the merger to June 2022, after the companies were unable to meet the original closing conditions, including SEC-related registration filings. In July 2022, eToro and FinTech Acquisition Corp. V terminated the merger agreement without a termination fee.

In March 2023, eToro raised $250 million at a $3.5 billion valuation, with investors including ION Group, Social Leverage, SoftBank and Spark Capital.

In May 2025, eToro completed its initial public offering on the Nasdaq. The offering was priced at $52 per share and raised about $620 million in total. The company received approximately $310 million from the sale of nearly 6 million shares. The company was valued at approximately $5.6 billion on its Nasdaq debut.

== Operations ==
eToro provides brokerage, cryptoasset, payment and electronic-money services through separately regulated subsidiaries, with its product offering varying by jurisdiction. Its investment firms are regulated by the FCA in the United Kingdom and the CySEC in Cyprus; its U.S. broker-dealer is registered with the SEC and is a member of the FINRA; and subsidiaries in Australia, Abu Dhabi, the Seychelles and Singapore are licensed by the ASIC, the Financial Services Regulatory Authority of ADGM, the Seychelles Financial Services Authority and the MAS, respectively. A separate U.S. subsidiary is registered with the SEC as an investment adviser. The group also holds cryptoasset and electronic-money authorisations, including a MiCA authorisation for eToro (Europe) Ltd, a Gibraltar distributed-ledger-technology authorisation for eToro X Limited, and electronic-money licences in the United Kingdom and Malta.

== Financials ==
eToro earns money from trading and investing activity on its platform, including stocks, cryptoassets, commodities, currencies and other assets, and its results are affected by retail investor activity, market volatility and the mix of assets traded by users. In 2024, the company benefited from higher retail trading volumes as equity markets reached record highs and investor interest in stocks and cryptocurrencies increased. Total commission rose 46% to $931 million, compared with $639 million in 2023, while net income increased to $192.4 million from $15.3 million. Cryptoasset trading accounted for 38% of eToro's commissions in 2024, more than double its share in 2023.

Because eToro's gross revenue includes large cryptoasset-related amounts that are offset by corresponding costs, the company also reports net contribution, which deducts costs tied to cryptoasset activity and margin financing. This makes the measure less affected by the gross accounting of crypto trading than revenue alone. In 2025, eToro reported net contribution of $868 million, up 10% from 2024, and net income of $216 million, up 12%. Funded accounts increased to 3.81 million, and assets under administration reached $18.5 billion.

In 2025, trading activity partly shifted from cryptoassets toward equities, commodities and currencies as crypto markets became more volatile. In the fourth quarter, net trading income from equities, commodities and currencies rose 43% to $115.6 million, helped by investor rotation into traditional assets and stronger commodities trading.

== Marketing campaigns and sponsorships ==
In 2020, eToro released an advertising campaign starring Alec Baldwin that accumulated about 3 million views on YouTube. In February 2022, eToro aired its first Super Bowl commercial during Super Bowl LVI, one of several cryptocurrency-related advertisements shown during the game.

eToro has used sports sponsorships as a major part of its marketing strategy, particularly in European football. In 2020, it announced 12 football sponsorships across the United Kingdom and Germany, extending or adding partnerships with Crystal Palace, Everton, Leicester City, Southampton, West Bromwich Albion and Burnley in the United Kingdom, and with Eintracht Frankfurt, FC Augsburg, 1. FC Köln, Hamburger SV, 1. FC Union Berlin and VfL Wolfsburg in Germany. In 2024, eToro signed a two-year sponsorship agreement with Bayer 04 Leverkusen and renewed its front-of-shirt sponsorship of SK Slavia Prague.

In 2025, eToro became an official sponsor of Premiership Women's Rugby, adding to its existing sponsorship of Premiership Men's Rugby, and renewed partnerships with Crystal Palace, Everton and West Ham United across both men's and women's teams. The same year, eToro signed a multi-year sponsorship deal with Nottingham Forest, covering both the club's men's and women's teams for the 2025–26 season.

In January 2026, eToro announced multi-year sponsorship agreements with four Ligue 1 clubs: AS Monaco, LOSC Lille, Olympique de Marseille and Olympique Lyonnais. It also entered Formula One sponsorship through a partnership with BWT Alpine Formula One Team, becoming the team's exclusive trading and investment partner for the 2026 season.

In July 2024, eToro collaborated with Lightricks' LTX Studio on an AI-generated advertisement that aired during the 2024 Summer Olympics in Paris. In 2025, it partnered with Google to create a TV and YouTube advertising campaign using Google DeepMind's Veo 2 video-generation technology.

== Legal and regulatory issues ==
=== CFDs and conflicts of interest ===
eToro has faced criticism over its use of contracts for difference (CFDs), leveraged trading and copy trading features. In 2021, The Times of Israel cited critics who said that leveraged CFDs were complex products unsuitable for inexperienced retail investors and that eToro's platform presented different products in a way that could make the transition from unleveraged investing to leveraged CFD trading appear seamless. In leveraged positions, users traded CFDs with eToro as the counterparty. eToro acknowledged that CFD trading on its platform involved a conflict of interest, but said that the conflict was managed and disclosed to clients.

=== Customer position closures ===
In January 2021, eToro told European clients that, due to extreme volatility in crypto markets, all leveraged crypto positions had to be converted into non-leveraged positions. Clients were warned that positions would be closed within four hours if they did not comply.

In March 2022, after the Russian invasion of Ukraine, eToro liquidated customer positions in Magnit (MGNTL.L) stock at $0.01 per share. Before the invasion, Magnit shares had traded at $14.20. Affected holders of Russian depositary receipts (GDRs) argued that the forced sale was unlawful and launched a petition that gathered about 1,000 signatures. After complaints from affected clients, eToro offered a one-time reimbursement.

=== Misleading advertising in Italy, 2023 ===
In 2023, the Italian Competition Authority fined eToro Europe €1.3 million for misleading advertising. The Authority found that eToro's Italian website promoted commission-free share trading while failing to adequately disclose other costs and restrictions, including currency conversion costs, limits on transferring shares to other intermediaries, and constraints on the exercise of shareholder rights. These omissions could lead consumers to make commercial decisions they would not otherwise have made, in violation of Articles 20, 21 and 22 of the Italian Consumer Code.

=== ASIC lawsuit, 2023 ===
In August 2023, the Australian Securities and Investments Commission filed proceedings in the Federal Court against eToro Aus Capital Limited over its contract for difference (CFD) product, alleging breaches of design and distribution obligations and of eToro's licence obligation to act efficiently, honestly and fairly. ASIC said eToro's target market for CFDs was too broad for a high-risk and volatile product, and that its screening test was inadequate to determine whether retail clients were likely to be within that market. It alleged that between 5 October 2021 and 14 June 2023, almost 20,000 eToro clients lost money trading CFDs.

The proceedings remained ongoing as of March 2026.

=== SEC settlement over crypto trading, 2024 ===
In September 2024, eToro USA LLC agreed to pay $1.5 million to settle charges by the U.S. Securities and Exchange Commission that it had operated as an unregistered broker and unregistered clearing agency in connection with cryptoasset trading. The SEC said that, since at least 2020, eToro had allowed U.S. customers to trade cryptoassets that were offered and sold as securities without complying with federal registration requirements. eToro agreed to cease trading activity in nearly all cryptoassets for U.S. customers, leaving only Bitcoin, Bitcoin Cash, and Ether available for trading. U.S. customers were given 180 days to sell other cryptoassets, after which eToro was required to liquidate certain remaining assets that could not be transferred to customers and return the proceeds.

=== Other regulatory actions and warnings ===
Earlier regulatory actions and warnings involved several jurisdictions. In 2013, CySEC fined eToro €50,000 over weaknesses in its organizational and operational structure dating back to 2010. In 2015, Quebec's Autorité des marchés financiers included eToro on a list of unauthorized platforms, citing its encouragement of local residents to invest in binary options through its platform. In Canada, eToro operated without registration from 2008 to 2017 despite repeated warnings from the Ontario Securities Commission. In 2018, it agreed to pay a $550,000 administrative penalty, $25,000 in costs, and to disgorge nearly US$1.8 million. The company also agreed to close Ontario accounts and block access from Canadian IP addresses. In 2021, the UK's Advertising Standards Authority upheld complaints against an eToro cryptoasset advertisement, finding that it was irresponsible and misleading because it suggested that cryptocurrency investment was simple and suitable for inexperienced consumers and failed to make clear that the product was unregulated in the UK and that investments could fall in value.

Regulators in several Asian jurisdictions also issued warnings or restrictions. In 2020, the Securities Commission Malaysia said eToro was not licensed or registered to carry out regulated activities in Malaysia. The company stated that Asian investors were regulated under its ASIC licence and could trade through it. In 2022, the Reserve Bank of India included eToro on its alert list of unauthorized forex trading platforms, later expanding the list to 88 platforms. In 2024, the Philippine SEC issued an advisory against eToro, stating that the company was not registered locally and was offering securities without the required licence. eToro denied active promotion of its services in the Philippines, but later announced that it would stop operations in the country, citing "risk management considerations".
