= Retail foreign exchange trading =

Part of foreign exchange market

Retail foreign exchange trading is a small segment of the larger foreign exchange market where individuals speculate on the exchange rate between different currencies. This segment has developed with the advent of dedicated electronic trading platforms and the internet, which allows individuals to access the global currency markets. As of 2016, it was reported that retail foreign exchange trading represented 5.5% of the whole foreign exchange market ($282 billion in daily trading turnover).

Prior to the development of forex trading platforms in the late 1990s, forex trading was restricted to large financial institutions. It was the development of the internet, trading software, and forex brokers allowing trading on margin, that started the growth of retail trading. Today, traders are able to trade spot currencies with market makers on margin. This means they need to put down only a small percentage of the trade size and can buy and sell currencies in seconds.

== History ==
The first generation of forex online trading platforms emerged in 1994. Web technology allowed retail foreign exchange traders to access markets and trade currency pairs from their own computers.

The development of trading platforms has progressed through several stages. Initially, platforms consisted of basic programs downloaded to computers, followed by easier-to-use interfaces incorporating features such as charting and technical analysis tools. Platforms subsequently migrated to the web and to mobile devices such as tablets and smartphones. Since 2010, development has focused on integrating automated trading and social trading capabilities into forex platforms.

== Regulation ==
Starting in 2010, financial regulators in developed markets have introduced measures to limit the amount of leverage that retail investors can take on, particularly across foreign exchange transactions. These restrictions sought to limit speculation and protect retail investors against unexpected losses. Forex brokers are also regulated; most countries have anti-money laundering and counter-terrorism financing regulations that include know your customer requirements for brokers. Some cryptocurrency regulations may also apply where cryptocurrencies are used to deposit and withdraw funds from forex brokers.

=== United States ===
In the United States, no single regulator oversees all retail forex activities. The Dodd-Frank Act allocated jurisdictional authority over retail forex derivatives to multiple agencies — including the SEC, CFTC, OCC, Federal Reserve, FDIC, NFA, and FINRA — depending on the type of entity facilitating the transactions. Per the Commodity Exchange Act, the CFTC has jurisdiction over futures commission merchants, retail foreign exchange dealers, and other previously unregulated entities. Though oversight remains fragmented, regulatory scrutiny of the sector has grown alongside the market itself.

The Commodity Futures Trading Commission (CFTC) limited leverage available to retail forex traders to 50:1 on major currency pairs and 20:1 for all others. Major currencies include the Australian dollar, the British pound, the Canadian dollar, the Danish Krone, the euro, the Japanese yen, the New Zealand dollar, the Norwegian Krone, the Swedish Krona, the Swiss franc and the US dollar. The National Futures Association (NFA) is authorized to periodically review the list of major currencies, in light of changes in volatility.

The initial version of the CFTC's 2010 regulations proposed lowering leverage limits to 10:1. But the CFTC adopted the higher 50:1 and 20:1 leverage limits described following criticism from Forex market participants. No such restrictions existed prior to 2010, when these rules came into effect.

=== European Union ===
In Europe, the European Securities and Markets Authority (ESMA) caped the amount of leverage that brokers and CFD providers could offer retail investors. These limits, which came into effect in 2018, vary between 30:1 and just 2:1, depending on the asset class. More volatile asset classes, like crypto-currencies, tend to attract lower limits.

ESMA’s limits on leverage are as follows:

- 30:1 for major currency pairs;
- 20:1 for non-major currency pairs, gold and major equity indices;
- 10:1 for commodities other than gold and non-major equity indices;
- 5:1 for individual equities and other reference values;
- 2:1 for crypto-currencies.

ESMA's major currency pairs comprise any two of the following currencies: the US dollar, the euro, the Japanese yen, the pound sterling, the Canadian dollar or the Swiss franc. All other currencies are deemed non-major.

ESMA's major indices are any of the following equity indices: FTSE 100, CAC 40, DAX30, DJIA, S&P 500, NASDAQ, NASDAQ 100, Nikkei 225, ASX 200, EURO STOXX 50. All other indices are deemed non-major.

=== United Kingdom ===
The UK's Financial Conduct Authority (FCA) followed ESMA's restrictions on leverage in 2019. This means that ESMA's measures outlined above became part of UK domestic law when the UK left the EU. These measures remain in place to this day.

=== Japan ===
In Japan, the Financial Services Agency (FSA) restricted leverage available to retail traders across foreign exchange transactions as early as 2010. Maximum leverage was capped at 50:1 in August 2010, and was subsequently reduced to 25:1 in August 2011. In early 2000s, housewives of Japan collectively called Mrs Watanabe, started in currency trading to improve their financial situation.

=== Australia ===
In Australia, the Australian Securities & Investments Commission (ASIC) introduced a product intervention order in March 2021 that included leverage limits that brokers and CFD providers could offer retail investors. This included limiting currency leverage to a maximum of 30:1.

== Fraud ==
Retail forex trading has been promoted by some as an easy way to make profits and has thus been the focus for a number of foreign exchange frauds. In response, financial regulators in a number of countries have introduced restrictions or provided warnings about this type of trading as well as legal actions against perpetrators. However, due to the decentralized nature of currency trading and the easy global access to the internet, a number of brokers are based in less restrictive jurisdictions.

== See also ==
- Broker
- Day trader
- Scalping
- Category:Foreign exchange companies
