= Electronic trading platform =

Software for trading financial products

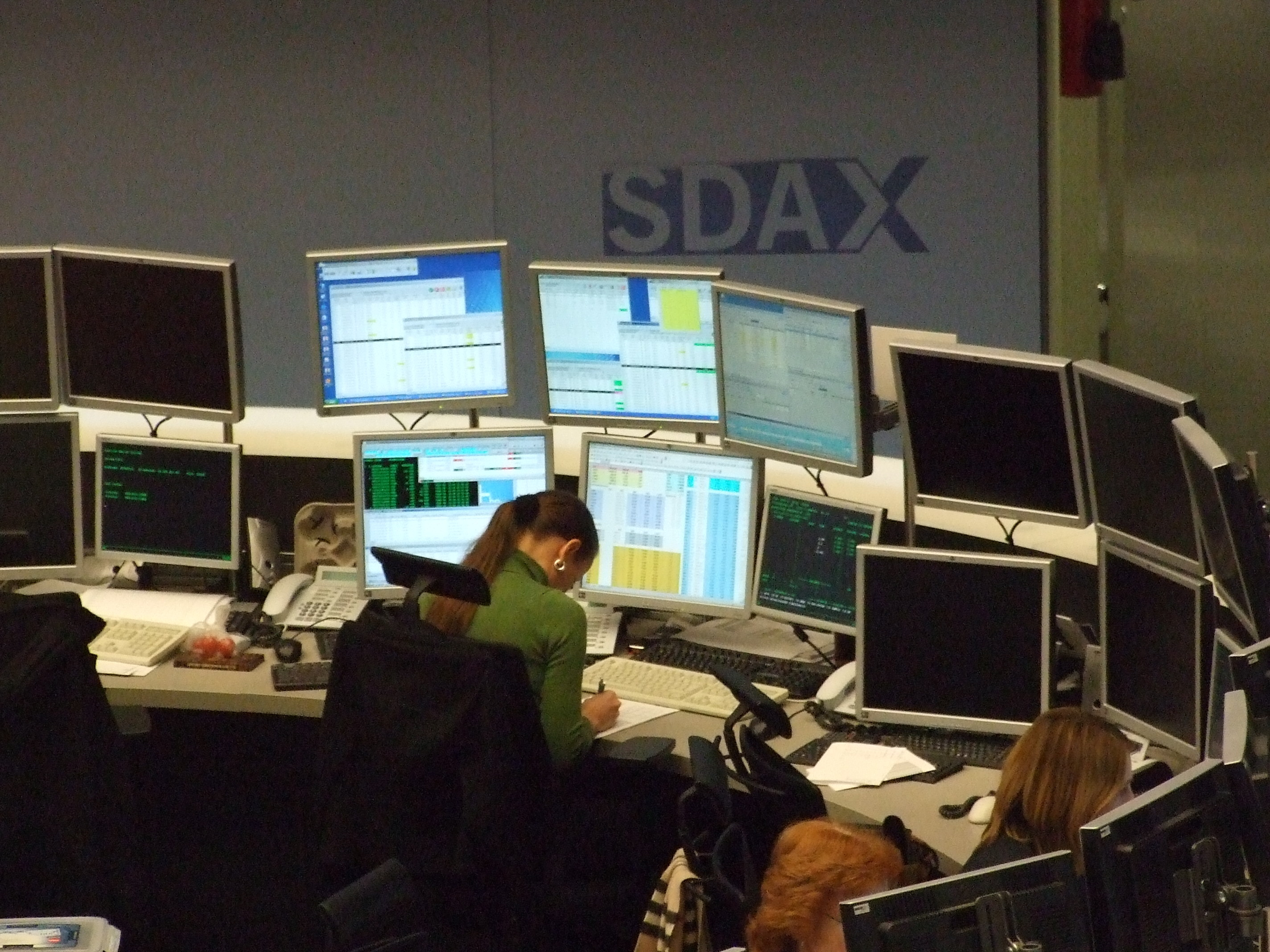
An electronic trading platform being used at the Deutsche Börse

In finance, an electronic trading platform, also known as an online trading platform, is a software program used to place orders for financial products over a network with a financial intermediary. Products traded include stocks, bonds, currencies, commodities and derivatives, through intermediaries such as brokers, market makers, investment banks or stock exchanges, or directly between members of the platform. The platforms allow trading from any location, in contrast to traditional floor trading using open outcry. The term is sometimes also used for the trading software alone.

Electronic trading platforms typically stream live market prices and may provide tools such as charting packages, news feeds and account management. Some give individuals access to markets formerly reachable only by specialist firms using direct market access, and some support automated strategies based on technical analysis or high-frequency trading. They are usually mobile-friendly and available for Windows, macOS, Linux, iOS and Android, contributing to the growth of retail investing.

== Etymology ==
The term trading platform is used to distinguish the software from a "trading system", which usually denotes a trading method or strategy rather than the computer system used to execute orders.

== Historic development ==
Financial transactions were handled manually by brokers or counterparties until the 1970s, when electronic trading platforms were introduced. Early venues included electronic communication networks, alternative trading systems and dark pools. A Bank for International Settlements survey documented how these venues reshaped market liquidity, transparency and structure.

The first platforms were associated with stock exchanges and let brokers place orders remotely over dedicated networks and dumb terminals. Early systems often confirmed orders some time after they were placed rather than streaming live prices, and were known as "request for quote" systems.

Nasdaq was created in 1971 by the National Association of Securities Dealers and operated entirely electronically, opening on 8 February 1971. By 1992 it accounted for 42% of US trade volume.

In 1992, Globex became the first electronic trading platform to reach the market, launched by the Chicago Mercantile Exchange on Reuters technology. E-Trade soon launched a consumer-oriented platform, growing at 9% per month in 1999. In the late 2000s a new generation of firms began serving non-professional investors. eToro, founded in 2007, offered copy trading and social trading, and the cryptocurrency exchange Binance was founded in 2017.

Later systems added live streaming prices, near-instant execution and internet connectivity, reducing the importance of location. Many platforms provide scripting tools and APIs for algorithmic trading. Research using the New York Stock Exchange's introduction of automated quote dissemination found that algorithmic trading narrowed bid-ask spreads and improved quote informativeness, particularly for large stocks. Between 2001 and 2005, dedicated online trading portals emerged, offering a choice of platforms rather than a single institution's software.

== Systemic risk ==
The automation of order flow has raised concerns about systemic risk. During the Flash Crash of 6 May 2010, the Dow Jones Industrial Average fell about 9% within minutes before recovering much of the loss. A joint report by the SEC and the Commodity Futures Trading Commission attributed the event to a large automated sell program executed against thinning liquidity without regard to price or time. A study of E-mini S&P 500 futures data found that high-frequency traders did not change their trading pattern during the crash but rapidly consumed the remaining liquidity.

== Regulations ==
=== Information reporting ===
In 1995 the U.S. Securities and Exchange Commission (SEC) adopted Rule 17a-23, requiring registered automated trading platforms to report participants, orders and trades each quarter. These transparency requirements strengthened user confidence in the platforms.

=== Order handling rules ===
Market fragmentation led some Nasdaq market makers on Instinet to quote better prices than on Nasdaq. The SEC's 1996 Order Handling Rules required specialists and market makers to display any improved price quoted on a proprietary system, and to display the size and price of customer limit orders that improved their quotation.

=== Alternative trading systems ===
In December 1998 the SEC adopted Regulation ATS, allowing alternative trading systems and electronic communication networks to register as broker-dealers rather than as exchanges, subject to fair-access, capacity and record-keeping rules. This integrated the venues into the national market system and increased competition.

=== Decimalization ===
In 2001 the SEC introduced decimalization, requiring prices in increments of $0.01 instead of $0.0625. The change lowered margins and trading costs and encouraged dealers to adopt electronic management systems.

== Features ==
Electronic trading platforms commonly provide historical data and graphs used in technical analysis of instruments. Many also include current news and third-party ratings, giving retail traders access to information similar to that available to professionals, as well as portfolio-tracking functions.

== See also ==
- Automated trading system
- Electronic communication network (ECN)
- High-frequency trading (HFT)
- List of electronic trading platforms
- Retail forex platform
- Single-dealer platform
- Stock market data systems
- Straight-through processing (STP)
- Technical analysis software
- Trading room
- Trading system
