= Almgren–Chriss model =

Mathematical model in optimal trade execution

The Almgren–Chriss model is a mathematical model in mathematical finance for the optimal execution of large portfolio transactions. Developed by Robert Almgren and Neil Chriss in a series of working papers in 1999 and published in 2000, the model frames the liquidation of a large position over a fixed time horizon as a mean-variance trade-off between market impact costs (incurred by trading too quickly) and timing risk (incurred by trading too slowly). It is one of the foundational results in the modern theory of algorithmic trading and remains widely used in institutional execution algorithms.

== Background ==
The optimal execution problem arises when a trader must buy or sell a quantity of an asset large enough that the act of trading itself affects the asset's price. Trading the entire position immediately ("market order") moves the price adversely and produces a poor average execution price; spreading the trade over a long interval reduces this price impact but exposes the trader to price risk from independent market movements over the execution window.

The problem was first studied formally by Bertsimas and Lo in 1998, who derived an optimal trajectory under risk-neutral preferences and a linear permanent impact. Almgren and Chriss extended this framework to risk-averse traders by introducing a mean–variance objective and an explicit distinction between permanent and temporary impact, producing closed-form optimal trajectories that depend on the trader's risk aversion.

== Model formulation ==
A trader holds $X$ shares of a single asset and must liquidate the position by a deadline $T$. Time is divided into $N$ intervals of length $\tau = T/N$, and the trader chooses a sequence of holdings $x_0, x_1, \ldots, x_N$, with $x_0 = X$ and $x_N = 0$. The number of shares sold in interval $k$ is $n_k = x_{k-1} - x_k$, and the corresponding selling rate is $v_k = n_k / \tau$.

The model assumes that the asset's unaffected price follows an arithmetic Brownian motion,

$$S_k = S_{k-1} + \sigma \sqrt{\tau} \, \xi_k - \tau \, g(v_k),$$

where $\sigma$ is the price volatility, the $\xi_k$ are independent standard normal shocks, and $g(v_k)$ is the permanent market impact function representing the lasting effect of the trade on the equilibrium price. In addition, each trade is executed at a price that differs from the prevailing price by a temporary market impact $h(v_k)$, reflecting the immediate liquidity cost that does not persist:

$$\tilde{S}_k = S_{k-1} - h(v_k).$$

In the original Almgren–Chriss paper, both impact functions are taken to be linear in the trading rate: $g(v) = \gamma v$ and $h(v) = \eta v$, with $\gamma, \eta > 0$.

The total expected cost of the execution (the implementation shortfall) and its variance can then be expressed in closed form as functions of the holdings trajectory $\{x_k\}$. The trader minimises

$$\mathbb{E}[C] + \lambda \, \mathrm{Var}[C],$$

where $C$ is the total transaction cost and $\lambda \geq 0$ is a risk aversion parameter.

== Optimal trajectory ==
For linear impact functions, the optimal liquidation trajectory has the closed form

$$x_k = X \, \frac{\sinh\bigl(\kappa (T - t_k)\bigr)}{\sinh(\kappa T)},$$

where $\kappa$ is a constant determined by the impact and risk-aversion parameters,

$$\kappa = \frac{1}{\tau}\,\mathrm{arccosh}\!\left(\frac{\tau^2}{2}\,\tilde{\kappa}^2 + 1\right), \qquad \tilde{\kappa}^2 = \frac{\lambda \sigma^2}{\eta - \tfrac{1}{2}\gamma\tau}.$$

The trajectory is a hyperbolic sine curve that interpolates between two limiting cases:

- When $\lambda = 0$ (the risk-neutral case), the optimal trajectory is linear in time, recovering the time-weighted average price (TWAP) execution schedule.
- As $\lambda \to \infty$, the trader becomes infinitely averse to timing risk and the optimal trajectory degenerates to immediate liquidation at $t = 0$.

In intermediate cases, the more risk-averse the trader, the more front-loaded the execution schedule: a larger fraction of the position is liquidated near the start of the interval to reduce the variance of the realised cost.

== Extensions ==
The original model has been extended in several directions:

- Non-linear impact functions. Almgren generalised the model in 2003 to allow non-linear (typically power-law) temporary impact, motivated by empirical observations that price concession grows sub-linearly in trade size.
- Continuous-time and stochastic-control formulations. Continuous-time versions of the model have been developed using Hamilton–Jacobi–Bellman methods, allowing for dynamic re-optimisation and richer price dynamics.
- Volume-dependent extensions. Kato introduced an explicit trading-volume process into the framework and showed that, in the risk-neutral limit, the optimal execution coincides with a VWAP-tracking strategy.
- Adaptive strategies. Almgren and Lorenz showed that, because the variance objective is dynamically inconsistent, adaptive strategies that re-optimise as new price information arrives improve on the static Almgren–Chriss schedule.

== Applications ==
The Almgren–Chriss framework underlies a large class of institutional execution algorithms, including implementation-shortfall and arrival-price strategies offered by major broker-dealers and execution venues.

== See also ==
- Algorithmic trading
- Implementation shortfall
- Market impact
- Time-weighted average price
- Volume-weighted average price
