= Indication of interest =

An indication of interest (IOI), sometimes expression of interest (EOI), is an expression in finance that demonstrates a buyer's non-binding interest in buying a security in the stock market, often before it is available for purchase. IOIs are not required, but when a firm decides to issue one, they are primarily used on two occasions: before an IPO, and before an institution places a block trade.

== Underwriting ==
Prior to an IPO, an IOI demonstrates a conditional, non-binding interest in buying a security that is currently awaiting regulatory approval (securities in the United States must be cleared by the Securities and Exchange Commission). During this period, the security is said to be in registration and selling is illegal. The investor's stockbroker is then required to provide the investor with a preliminary prospectus. The IOI remains open-ended and is not a commitment to buy.

For large trades of newly issued securities, different from a pre-IPO indication, an indication of interest are expressions of trading interest that contain one or more of the following elements: the security name, whether the participant is buying or selling, the number of shares, capacity and/or price of the purchase or sale. Firms and broker/dealers have the ability to electronically communicate or advertise proprietary or client trading interest in the form of IOIs to the marketplace, either through their own systems or through dedicated trading platforms, such as a Bloomberg Terminal or Thomson Reuters products.

== Liquidity ==
IOIs are also used by brokers, market makers, liquidity providers, and dark pools to query liquidity without having to place visible orders in the aggregated order book (Level-2 MarketDepth).

== Regulatory treatment ==
In the United States, indications of interest used in securities distributions are treated differently from completed orders or sales. During an offering, a solicited indication of interest does not by itself permit an investor to buy the security immediately in the market; market transactions following such solicitation may be treated as solicited transactions for purposes of Regulation M.

Indications of interest used in secondary-market trading may also raise regulatory issues if they are inaccurate or misleading. FINRA has treated IOIs as communications of trading interest and has stated that firms may disseminate them to indicate that they seek to interact with other order flow in a security. FINRA Rule 5210 also addresses the publication of transactions and quotations and includes rule history concerning the display of indications of interest.

== See also ==
- Underwriting
- Aftermarket
- Electronic communication network
