= Crossing network =

A crossing network is an alternative trading system (ATS) that matches buy and sell orders electronically for execution without first routing the order to an exchange or other public displayed market such as an electronic communication network (ECN). Such crossing networks are a type of dark pool that employ computerized systems to match buyers and sellers of large blocks of shares without using a stock exchange. The advantage of the crossing network is the ability to execute a large block order without impacting the public quote and avoidance of market impact (i.e., the movements in a stock's price due to an investor's indication of interest).

These networks are often owned and operated by broker-dealers to match buyers and sellers of large blocks of shares. Depending on the particular broker-dealer's system and the type of securities traded (e.g., exchange-listed or OTC securities), these crosses could occur at various times during the day, or after the close of trading, and could be priced at the last sale price or some other objective price, such as the midpoint between the bid and offer or the volume weighted average price (VWAP).

Crossing networks tend to be used for highly liquid stocks and offer money managers the advantages of very low commissions, anonymity for the buying or selling, and avoidance of market impact. As of 2012, examples of crossing networks included Liquidnet, Pipeline Trading Systems, ITG POSIT and Goldman Sachs' SIGMA X.

== Regulation and trading venues ==
Crossing networks are a type of alternative trading system (ATS), which are non-exchange trading venues that bring together buyers and sellers of securities without being registered as a national securities exchange. As ATSs, crossing networks must operate under the regulatory framework established for these trading systems in the United States, including registration with the Securities and Exchange Commission (SEC) as a broker-dealer and compliance with reporting requirements, even though they do not display pre-trade quotes on public exchanges.

Crossing networks match buy and sell orders electronically outside traditional exchange order books, often at objective benchmark prices (such as the midpoint of the bid-ask spread). This structure allows institutional traders to execute large orders with reduced market impact and increased anonymity compared to trading on public exchanges, but it also means these systems are less transparent to ordinary investors.

Crossing networks, dark pools, and other ATSs together represent an important segment of modern securities markets, facilitating liquidity provision and off-exchange trading while remaining subject to oversight to protect market integrity and investor interests. Agencies such as the SEC and FINRA monitor ATS activity and require trade reporting for transactions in listed securities to ensure proper surveillance of the broader market.
