= Best execution =

Financial regulation

Best execution refers to the duty of an investment services firm (such as a stock broker) executing orders on behalf of customers to ensure the best execution possible for their customers' orders. Some of the factors the broker must consider when seeking best execution of their customers' orders include: the opportunity to get a better price than what is currently quoted, and the likelihood and speed of execution.

== History ==
In 1975, the United States Congress passed the Securities Acts Amendments of 1975, authorizing the U.S. Securities and Exchange Commission to facilitate a national market system. This led to the established in 2005 of Regulation NMS which was intended to assure that investors receive the best (NBBO) price executions for their orders by encouraging competition in the market.

In Europe, in 2014 there has been an attempt to define "best execution" within the Markets in Financial Instruments Directive (MiFID), which introduces the principle that, when carrying out transactions on their clients' behalf, "investment firms [shall] take all sufficient steps to obtain, when executing orders, the best possible result for their clients taking into account price, costs, speed, likelihood of execution and settlement, size, nature or any other consideration relevant to the execution of the order. Nevertheless, where there is a specific instruction from the client the investment firm shall execute the order following the specific instruction." MiFID II. Article 27 "Obligation to execute orders on terms most favourable to the client"

For most broker-dealers or execution agents, best executions are usually optimally constructed via either static or dynamic programming.

The focus on best execution by regulators has been blamed for unintended consequences, including the rise of high-frequency trading.

== Benchmarks for "Best" ==
The keyword of "best" must be defined with respect to a chosen benchmark. The most common benchmark prices or costs are:

- Arrival Price - the price $p_0$at the start of the execution, e.g., the mid price at 2:15 pm when the execution starts. This is a pre-trade benchmark, known even before the execution is completed.
- Weighted Average Price - the weighted average price (WAP) of the market over the execution horizon. This is a post-trade benchmark, only available after the completion of the execution. The most common two WAPs are Volume-WAP (VWAP) and Time-WAP (TWAP). They are defined by $\frac{\int_{T_0}^{T_1} p_t \,dV_t}{\int_{T_0}^{T_1} dV_t}$ for VWAP and $\frac{\int_{T_0}^{T_1} p_t \,dt}{\int_{T_0}^{T_1} dt}$ for TWAP, where $V_t$ denotes the cumulative market volume at time $t$, and $[T_0, \; T_1]$ the execution horizon. In reality, $p_t$ refers to the last trade price (LTP).

Different benchmarks have their own pros and cons. For example, the Arrival Price is intuitive and is the "paper" price one would expect assuming abundant liquidity and zero market impact. However, it is transient. Under a Brownian motion with a high volatility, an instantaneous snapshot of the price process may not be a stable benchmark at all. VWAP and TWAP are more stable as they are averaged over the execution horizons, but they are somewhat "flying" targets as the market progressively rolls out.

== "Best" Liquidity Sources ==
A source of liquidity is also called a "venue." A venue could be a national exchange such as the New York Stock Exchange (NYSE) in the United States, or an Electronic communication network (ECN) or a more general off-exchange alternative trading system (ATS - Americas) or multilateral trading facility (MTF - Europe). A dark pool is a special ATS typically run by off-exchange broker-dealers or agency houses, where order information is not published or displayed and matching is done in the "dark" (albeit following a pre-defined set of matching rules). For most OTC products (e.g., non-listed derivatives), the single-dealer or multi-dealer platforms also provide access to principal liquidity sources offered by broker-dealers.

Best execution crucially relies on identifying the "best" liquidity sources, which may involve the examination of several related factors, such as:

- Price - is the price offered from the source the best at the moment from all available liquidity sources?
- Fees - is it cheap to take liquidity from the source? Each venue charges fees (or rebates) for participating in the venue activities.
- Information Leakage - will the trade information be leaked to the market, as to adversely impact the cost of executing the remaining positions. This is the major concern for executing a large order (often from institutional clients).
- Adverse selection - does the source or venue have an established pattern (or high likelihood) of offering abundant "aggressive" liquidity before the market will slide in one direction?

== Evaluating best execution ==
Some of the factors a broker needs to consider when executing its customers' orders for best execution are these: the opportunity to get a better price than what is currently quoted, the speed of execution, and the likelihood the trade will be executed.

Best execution is often mistaken for trading at market price, without taking into consideration factors such as the size of the trade or settlement period.

== Related definitions ==
Price improvement is the opportunity but not the guarantee that an order will be executed at a better price than what is currently quoted publicly.

== See also ==
- Markets in Financial Investments Directive is a European Union Directive which, among other things, solidifies best execution regulations.
- Regulation NMS is a US regulation related to Best execution.
