= Central limit order book =

Centralised database of limit orders

A central limit order book (CLOB) is a trading method used by most exchanges globally using the order book and a matching engine to execute limit orders. It is a transparent system that matches customer orders (e.g. bids and offers) on a 'price time priority' basis. The highest ("best") bid order and the lowest ("cheapest") offer order constitutes the best market or "the touch" in a given security or swap contract.

Customers can routinely cross the bid/ask spread to effect immediate execution. They also can see market depth or the "stack" in which customers can view bid orders for various sizes and prices on one side vs. viewing offer orders at various sizes and prices on the other side. The CLOB is by definition fully transparent, real-time, anonymous and low cost in execution.

Such a book was proposed as a centralised database of limit orders by the U.S. Securities and Exchange Commission in 2000. However, the concept was opposed by securities companies. In the CLOB model, customers can trade directly with dealers, dealers can trade with other dealers, and importantly, customers can trade directly with other customers anonymously.

In contrast to the CLOB approach is the Request For Quote ("RFQ") trading method. RFQ is an asymmetric trade execution model. In this method, a customer queries a finite set of participant market makers who quote a bid/offer ("a market") to the customer. The customer may only "hit the bid" (sell to the highest bidder) or "lift the offer" (buy from the cheapest seller). The customer is prohibited from stepping inside the bid/ask spread and thereby reducing its execution fees. Contrary to the CLOB model, customers can only trade with dealers. They can not trade with other customers, and importantly, they can not make markets themselves.

== See also ==
- Office of Financial Research which may require a central limit order book
