= Liquidity crisis =

Acute shortage of liquidity

In financial economics, a liquidity crisis is an acute shortage of liquidity. Liquidity may refer to market liquidity (the ease with which an asset can be converted into a liquid medium, e.g. cash), funding liquidity (the ease with which borrowers can obtain external funding), or accounting liquidity (the health of an institution's balance sheet measured in terms of its cash-like assets). Additionally, some economists define a market to be liquid if it can absorb "liquidity trades" (sale of securities by investors to meet sudden needs for cash) without large changes in price. This shortage of liquidity could reflect a fall in asset prices below their long-run fundamental price, deterioration in external financing conditions, reduction in the number of market participants, or simply difficulty in trading assets.

The above-mentioned forces mutually reinforce each other during a liquidity crisis. Market participants in need of cash find it hard to locate potential trading partners to sell their assets. This may result either due to limited market participation or because of a decrease in cash held by financial market participants. Thus asset holders may be forced to sell their assets at a price below the long-term fundamental price. Borrowers typically face higher loan costs and collateral requirements, compared to periods of ample liquidity, and unsecured debt is nearly impossible to obtain. Typically, during a liquidity crisis, the interbank lending market does not function smoothly either.

Several mechanisms operating through the mutual reinforcement of asset market liquidity and funding liquidity can amplify the effects of a small negative shock to the economy and result in a lack of liquidity and eventually a full-blown financial crisis.

== A model of liquidity crisis ==
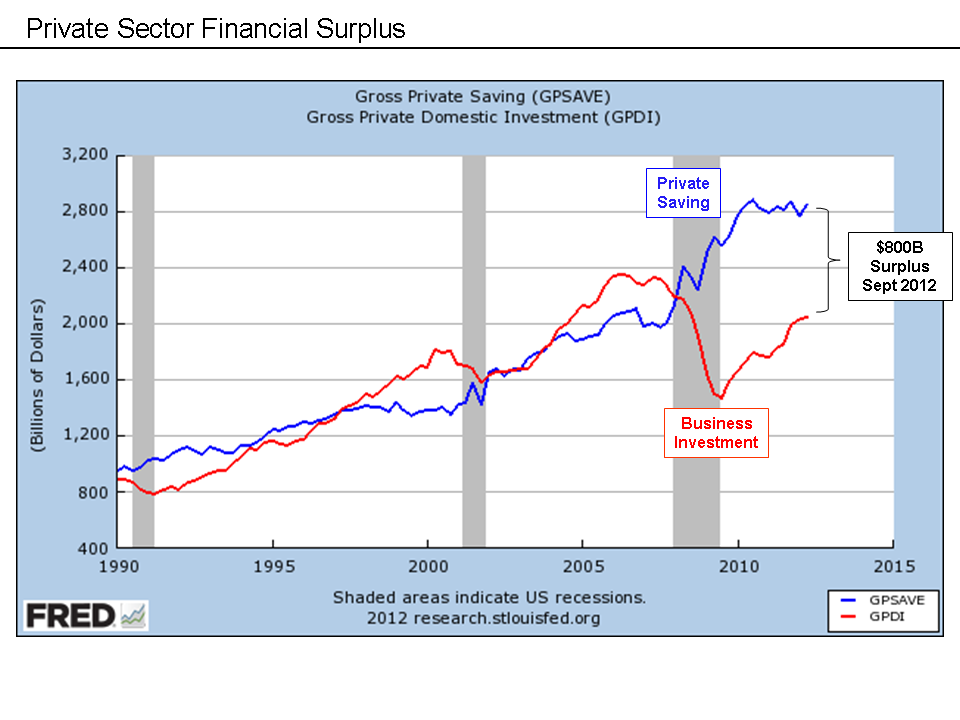
Overvaluation caused a liquidity crisis during the 2008 financial crisis, in which the housing bubble grew on predatory loans and speculation until it burst

One of the earliest and most influential models of liquidity crisis and bank runs was given by Diamond and Dybvig in 1983. The Diamond–Dybvig model demonstrates how financial intermediation by banks, performed by accepting assets that are inherently illiquid and offering liabilities which are much more liquid (offer a smoother pattern of returns), can make banks vulnerable to a bank run. Emphasizing the role played by demand deposit contracts in providing liquidity and better risk sharing among people, they argue that such a demand deposit contract has a potentially undesirable equilibrium where all depositors panic and withdraw their deposits immediately. This gives rise to self-fulfilling panics among depositors, as we observe withdrawals by even those depositors who would have actually preferred to leave their deposits in, if they were not concerned about the bank failing. This can lead to failure of even 'healthy' banks and eventually an economy-wide contraction of liquidity, resulting in a full-blown financial crisis.

Diamond and Dybvig demonstrate that when banks provide pure demand deposit contracts, we can actually have multiple equilibria. If confidence is maintained, such contracts can actually improve on the competitive market outcome and provide better risk sharing. In such an equilibrium, a depositor will only withdraw when it is appropriate for him to do so under optimal risk-sharing. However, if agents panic, their incentives are distorted and in such an equilibrium, all depositors withdraw their deposits. Since liquidated assets are sold at a loss, in this scenario, a bank will liquidate all its assets, even if not all depositors withdraw.

Note that the underlying reason for withdrawals by depositors in the Diamond–Dybvig model is a shift in expectations. Alternatively, a bank run may occur because the bank's assets, which are liquid but risky, no longer cover the nominally fixed liability (demand deposits), and depositors therefore withdraw quickly to minimize their potential losses.

The model also provides a suitable framework for analysis of devices that can be used to contain and even prevent a liquidity crisis (elaborated below).

== Amplification mechanisms ==
One of the mechanisms that can work to amplify the effects of a small negative shock to the economy is the balance sheet mechanism. Under this mechanism, a negative shock in the financial market lowers asset prices and erodes the financial institution's capital, thus worsening its balance sheet. Consequently, two liquidity spirals come into effect, which amplify the impact of the initial negative shock. In an attempt to maintain its leverage ratio, the financial institution must sell its assets, precisely at a time when their price is low. Thus, assuming that asset prices depend on the health of investors' balance sheet, erosion of investors' net worth further reduces asset prices, which feeds back into their balance sheet and so on. This is what Brunnermeier and Pedersen (2008) term as the "loss spiral". At the same time, lending standards and margins tighten, leading to the "margin spiral". Both these effects cause the borrowers to engage in a fire sale, lowering prices and deteriorating external financing conditions.

Apart from the "balance sheet mechanism" described above, the lending channel can also dry up for reasons exogenous to the borrower's credit worthiness. For instance, banks may become concerned about their future access to capital markets in the event of a negative shock and may engage in precautionary hoarding of funds. This would result in a reduction of funds available in the economy and a slowdown in economic activity. Additionally, the fact that most financial institutions are simultaneously engaged in lending and borrowing can give rise to a network effect. In a setting that involves multiple parties, a gridlock can occur when concerns about counterparty credit risk result in failure to cancel out offsetting positions. Each party then has to hold additional funds to protect itself against the risks that are not netted out, reducing liquidity in the market. These mechanisms may explain the 'gridlock' observed in the interbank lending market during the recent subprime crisis, when banks were unwilling to lend to each other and instead hoarded their reserves.

Besides, a liquidity crisis may even result due to uncertainty associated with market activities. Typically, market participants jump on the financial innovation bandwagon, often before they can fully apprehend the risks associated with new financial assets. Unexpected behaviour of such new financial assets can lead to market participants disengaging from risks they don't understand and investing in more liquid or familiar assets. This can be described as the information amplification mechanism. In the subprime mortgage crisis, rapid endorsement and later abandonment of complicated structured finance products such as collateralized debt obligations, mortgage-backed securities, etc. played a pivotal role in amplifying the effects of a drop in property prices.

== Liquidity crises and asset prices ==
Many asset prices drop significantly during liquidity crises. Hence, asset prices are subject to liquidity risk and risk-averse investors naturally require higher expected return as compensation for this risk. The liquidity-adjusted CAPM pricing model therefore states that the higher an asset's market-liquidity risk, the higher its required return.

Liquidity crises such as the 2008 financial crisis and the Long-Term Capital Management crisis of 1998 also result in deviations from the Law of one price, meaning that almost identical securities trade at different prices. This happens when investors are financially constrained and liquidity spirals affect more securities that are difficult to borrow against. Hence, a security's margin requirement can affect its value.

== Liquidity crunch and flight to liquidity ==
A phenomenon frequently observed during liquidity crises is flight to liquidity as investors exit illiquid investments and turn to secondary markets in pursuit of cash–like or easily saleable assets. Empirical evidence points towards widening price differentials during periods of liquidity shortage among assets that are otherwise alike, but differ in terms of their asset market liquidity. For instance, there are often large liquidity premia (in some cases as much as 10–15%) in Treasury bond prices. An example of a flight to liquidity occurred during the 1998 Russian financial crisis, when the price of Treasury bonds sharply rose relative to less liquid debt instruments. This resulted in widening of credit spreads and major losses at Long-Term Capital Management and many other hedge funds.

== Role for policy ==
There exists scope for government policy to alleviate a liquidity crunch by absorbing less liquid assets and in turn providing the private sector with more liquid government–backed assets, through the following channels:

Pre-emptive or ex-ante policy: Imposition of minimum equity-to-capital requirements or ceilings on debt-to-equity ratio on financial institutions other than commercial banks would lead to more resilient balance sheets. In the context of the Diamond–Dybvig model, an example of a demand deposit contract that mitigates banks' vulnerability to bank runs, while allowing them to be providers of liquidity and optimal risk sharing, entails suspension of convertibility when there are too many withdrawals. For instance, consider a contract which is identical to the pure demand deposit contract, except that it states that a depositor will not receive anything on a given date if he attempts to prematurely withdraw, after a certain fraction of the bank's total deposits have been withdrawn. Such a contract has a unique Nash equilibrium which is stable and achieves optimal risk sharing.

Expost policy intervention: Some experts suggest that the central bank should provide downside insurance in the event of a liquidity crisis. This could take the form of direct provision of insurance to asset-holders against losses or a commitment to purchasing assets in the event that the asset price falls below a threshold. Such 'asset purchases' will help drive up the demand and consequently the price of the asset in question, thereby easing the liquidity shortage faced by borrowers. Alternatively, the government could provide 'deposit insurance', where it guarantees that a promised return will be paid to all those who withdraw. In the framework of the Diamond–Dybvig model, demand deposit contracts with government deposit insurance help achieve the optimal equilibrium if the government imposes an optimal tax to finance the deposit insurance. Alternative mechanisms through which the central bank could intervene are direct injection of equity into the system in the event of a liquidity crunch or engaging in a debt for equity swap. It could also lend through the discount window or other lending facilities, providing credit to distressed financial institutions on easier terms. Ashcraft, Garleanu, and Pedersen (2010) argue that controlling the credit supply through such lending facilities with low margin requirements is an important second monetary tool (in addition to the interest rate tool), which can raise asset prices, lower bond yields, and ease the funding problems in the financial system during crises. While there are such benefits of intervention, there is also costs. It is argued by many economists that if the central bank declares itself as a lender of last resort (LLR), this might result in a moral hazard problem, with the private sector becoming lax and this may even exacerbate the problem. Many economists therefore assert that the LLR must only be employed in extreme cases and must be a discretion of the government rather than a rule.

== Liquidity crisis in emerging markets ==
Some economists argue that financial liberalization and increased inflows of foreign capital, especially if short-term, can aggravate illiquidity of banks and increase their vulnerability. In this context, 'International Illiquidity' refers to a situation in which a country's short-term financial obligations denominated in foreign/hard currency exceed the amount of foreign/hard currency that it can obtain on short notice. Empirical evidence reveals that weak fundamentals alone cannot account for all foreign capital outflows, especially from emerging markets. Open economy extensions of the Diamond–Dybvig Model, where runs on domestic deposits interact with foreign creditor panics (depending on the maturity of the foreign debt and the possibility of international default), offer a plausible explanation for the financial crises that were observed in Mexico, East Asia, Russia etc. These models assert that international factors can play a particularly important role in increasing domestic financial vulnerability and the likelihood of a liquidity crisis.

The onset of capital outflows can have particularly destabilising consequences for emerging markets. Unlike the banks of advanced economies, which typically have a number of potential investors in the world capital markets, informational frictions imply that investors in emerging markets are 'fair weather friends'. Thus, self–fulfilling panics akin to those observed during a bank run are much more likely for these economies. Moreover, policy distortions in these countries work to magnify the effects of adverse shocks. Given the limited access of emerging markets to world capital markets, illiquidity resulting from contemporaneous loss of domestic and foreign investor confidence is nearly sufficient to cause a financial and currency crisis, the 1997 Asian financial crisis being one example.

== See also ==
- 2008 financial crisis
- Credit crunch
- Financial accelerator
- Insolvency
- Liquidity preference
- Money supply
- Subprime mortgage crisis
