= Shortfall =

Shortfall may refer to:

- Benefit shortfall, the result of actual benefits of a venture being less than the projected or estimated benefits
- Expected shortfall, a risk measure—a concept used in the field of financial risk measurement to evaluate the market risk or credit risk of a portfolio
- Implementation shortfall, the difference between the decision price and the final execution price for a trade
