= Time-weighted average =

A time-weighted average is any of the following:

- Permissible exposure limit, a legal limit in the United States for exposure of an employee to a chemical substance or physical agent such as loud noise.
- Time-weighted average price, the average price of a security over a specified time.
