= Fred Federspiel =

American Inventor and avid Sax Enthusiast

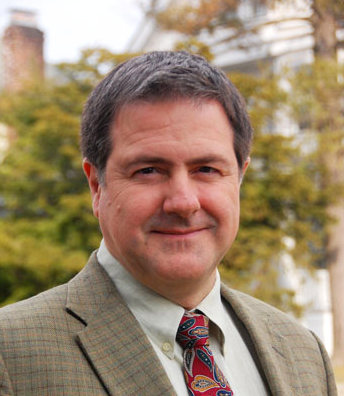
- Born: June 5, 1963 (age 63); West Lafayette, Indiana
- Education: University of Illinois at Urbana-Champaign

Fred Federspiel is an American technology entrepreneur, nuclear physicist and inventor.

== Biography ==
Born in West Lafayette Indiana in 1963, Federspiel earned a PhD in experimental nuclear physics from the University of Illinois at Urbana–Champaign in 1991, where he led the first self-consistent measurement of the electric and magnetic polarizability of the proton.

In 1993, he married his wife, Carey Mills, with whom he has four children, Harry, Ella, Erin, and Leo. A Baritone Sax enthusiast, he played in professor John Garvey's Jazz band for seven years. In 1991 Federspiel joined Los Alamos National Laboratory where he built the real-time data acquisition and analysis system for the Liquid Scintillator Neutrino Detector experiment, which reported evidence for neutrino oscillations in 1996. In 1997 he joined BiosGroup, and then in 1999 founded e-Xchange Advantage Corporation (e-XA) to deploy technology allowing institutional traders to control the information released to the market about their orders. e-XA became Pipeline Trading Systems LLC, which implemented Federspiel's inventions to reduce the cost inflicted by high-frequency trading on institutional trade execution. Federspiel's block market invention was one of two major market structure experiments enabling institutions to direct information dissemination about block orders to likely trading counterparties, the other notable example being Liquidnet. In 2020, Fred joined AlgoCortex LLC to improve the efficiency of the trading process through intelligent automation and preserve the hard-earned assets of institutional investors and their clients.

== Technical innovation ==
Federspiel is an inventor on US patents covering the display of market data, the design of trading systems, mechanisms to disseminate order information, and mechanisms to incentivize liquidity providers to provide quality trades to block trading systems.
