= Index arbitrage =

Statistical arbitrage using stock market indexes

Index arbitrage is a subset of statistical arbitrage focusing on index components.

An index (such as S&P 500) is made up of several components (in the case of the S&P 500, 500 large US stocks picked by S&P to represent the US market), and the value of the index is typically computed as a linear function of the component prices, where the details of the computation (such as the weights of the linear function) are determined in accordance with the index methodology.

The idea of index arbitrage is to exploit discrepancies between the market price of a product that tracks the index (such as a Stock market index future or Exchange-traded fund) and the market prices of the underlying index components, which are typically stocks. For example, an arbitrageur could take the current prices of traded stocks, calculate a synthetic index value using the relevant index methodology, and then apply an interest rate and dividend adjustment to calculate the "fair value" of the stock market index future. If the stock market index future is trading above its "fair value", the arbitrageur can buy the component stocks and sell the index future. Likewise, if the stock market index futures is trading below its "fair value", the arbitrageur can short the component stocks and buy the index future. In both cases, then the arbitrageur would be exposed to Basis risk if the interest rate and dividend yield risks are left unhedged.

In a different example, the arbitrageur can take the current prices of traded stocks, calculate the "fair value" of an ETF (based on its holdings, which are chosen to track the index) and arbitrage between the market price of the ETF and the market prices of the stock holdings. In this scenario, the arbitrageur would use the ETF creation and redemption process to net-out the offsetting ETF and stock positions.

== See also ==
- Algorithmic trading
- Complex event processing
- Dark pool
- Electronic trading
- Implementation shortfall
- Investment strategy
- Quantitative trading
- Quote stuffing
