= Average price =

Average price may refer to:

- Mean, the general statistical concept applied to prices
- Volume-weighted average price (VWAP), an execution benchmark in finance
- Time-weighted average price (TWAP), a time-weighted alternative to VWAP
- Moving average, a rolling average used in technical analysis
- Price index, in economics
- Average selling price, a business metric
- Average daily rate, in the hospitality industry
- Unit price, a normalised price per unit of measure
