= Private electronic market =

A private electronic market (PEM) uses the Internet to connect a limited number or pre-qualified buyers or sellers in one market. PEMs are a hybrid between perfectly open markets (e.g. exchanges where there is no pre-existing relationship between buyer and seller - similar to eBay) and closed contract negotiations (such as a sealed bid tender, where there is no visibility between competitors and hence no response to competition). The core idea of PEMs is to create competition among buyers/sellers while allowing buyers/sellers to adjust all those aspects of the deal that are typically only dealt with in a negotiation. This creates a problem of "comparing apples and oranges": bids may be quite different in many dimensions and therefore cannot easily be compared. Apart from the dimension of price these could include pre-negotiated discounts (e.g. for loyalty), specific qualities, combinations of goods and services with conditional pricing, freight differentials, contract fulfillment timing, payment terms, or deliberate constraints such as market share limits.

== Practical examples ==
VicForests, a government-owned agency in Australia, conducts bidding for native timber supply via a website called Forest Auctions. Saw Mills may submit bids specifying various conditions, including quantity, species of timber, and payment terms. Compared to the traditional sealed bid tender approach, the use of this private market reportedly resulted in a substantial revenue increase for VicForests.

Swiss online auction site Firstpex allows qualified investors to buy and sell private equities to each other through a bidding process.

== Relevance ==
The overall effect of a well designed Private Electronic Market is what is described as allocative efficiency or in simple terms: a win-win for the seller (who maximizes revenue) and buyers (acquiring exactly what is of highest value to them). PEMs are based on game theory and combinatorial auction theory.

== See also ==
- Dark pool
- Online auction
- Electronic markets
