= Block trade =

Privately-negotiated trade of large amounts of a security

A block trade is a high-volume transaction in a security that is privately negotiated and executed outside of the open market for that security. Major broker-dealers often provide "block trading" services—sometimes known as "upstairs trading desks"—to their institutional clients. In the United States and Canada a block trade is usually at least 10,000 shares of a stock or $100,000 of bonds but in practice significantly larger.

For instance, a hedge fund holds a large position in company X and would like to sell it completely. If this were put into the market as a large sell order, the price would sharply drop. By definition, the stake was large enough to affect supply and demand causing a market impact. Instead, the fund may arrange for a block trade with another company through an investment bank, benefiting both parties: the selling fund gets a more attractive purchase price, while the purchasing company can negotiate a discount off the market rates. Unlike large public offerings, for which it often takes months to prepare the necessary documentation, block trades are usually carried out at short notice and closed quickly.

For a variety of reasons, block trades can be more difficult than other trades and often expose the broker-dealer to more risk. Most notably, because the broker-dealer is committing to a price for a large amount of securities, any adverse market movement can saddle the broker-dealer with a large loss if the position has not been sold. As such, engaging in block trading can tie up a broker-dealer's capital. Further, the fact that a large, well-informed money manager wants to sell (or perhaps buy) a large position in a particular security may connote future price movements (i.e., the money manager may have an informational advantage); by taking the opposite side of the transaction, the broker-dealer runs the risk of "adverse selection".

Block trading is a useful measure for analysts in order to assess where institutional investors are pricing a stock, because in a merger or acquisition, a bid needs to "clear the market" (i.e. enough shareholders need to tender), it is most useful to see at what prices large blocks of stock are trading. These prices imply what the largest shareholders are willing to sell their shares for; therefore, in block trading analysis, small trades are ignored to avoid skewing the data.

== See also ==
- Program trading
- Dark liquidity
