= National Market System =

US securities regulatory mechanism

The National Market System (NMS) is a regulatory mechanism that governs the operations of securities trading in the United States. Its primary focus is ensuring transparency and full disclosure regarding stock price quotations and trade executions. It was initiated in 1975, when, in the Securities Acts Amendments of 1975, Congress directed the Securities and Exchange Commission (SEC) to use its authority to facilitate the establishment of a national market system. The system has been updated periodically, for example with the Regulation NMS in 2005 which took into account technological innovations and other market changes.

== History ==
In 1972, before the Securities and Exchange Commission (SEC) began its pursuit of a national market system, the market for securities was quite fragmented. The same stock sometimes traded at different prices at different trading venues, and the NYSE ticker tape did not report transactions of NYSE-listed stocks that took place on regional exchanges or on other over-the-counter securities markets. This fragmentation made it difficult for traders to comparison shop.

In 1975, in the Securities Acts Amendments of 1975, Congress directed the SEC to facilitate the establishment of a national market system for securities. The SEC was also directed to work with self-regulatory organizations in planning, developing, operating, or regulating a national market system. The responsibility of the National Market System is to ensure fair market competition, efficient order execution, transparency in price quotations, best-price execution, and direct matching of buy and sell orders.

In 2005, the rules promoting the National Market System were updated and consolidated into Regulation NMS.

The primary self-regulatory organization regulating member brokerage firms and exchange markets until 2007 was the National Association of Securities Dealers (NASD). In 2007 the NASD and NYSE member regulation group combined into the Financial Industry Regulatory Authority (FINRA). Since 2007, the National Market System has been primarily managed by FINRA and Nasdaq.

== System components ==
=== Overview ===
The National Market System includes and regulates all the facilities and entities which are used by broker-dealers to fulfill trade orders for securities. These include:

- Major stock exchanges, such as New York Stock Exchange and Nasdaq.
- A national central securities depositary for book-entry transfers (Depository Trust Company pursuant to Article 8 of the Uniform Commercial Code of New York State).
- A depositary nominee (Cede and Company) to retain custody of stockholder rights with respect to immobilized jumbo stock certificates.
- A Proxy Ballot processing organization (Broadridge).
- Intraday clearing corporations which act as a central counterparty for continuing securities settlement by facilitating novation of settlement obligations to themselves and offsetting opposing obligations (known as netting or clearing). These organizations include FICC, NSCC, etc.
- The facilities which operate the national price quotation system.

=== Major exchanges ===
- New York Stock Exchange
- Nasdaq. The exchange platform is owned by The NASDAQ OMX Group, which also owns the OMX stock market network and several other U.S. stock and options exchanges.

=== Self-regulatory organizations ===
- Financial Industry Regulatory Authority (FINRA)
- Municipal Securities Rulemaking Board (MSRB)

=== Federal regulators ===
==== Regulators of the US dollar: FDIC, OCC, FRBG, and FOMC ====
The Federal Deposit Insurance Corporation, the Office of the Comptroller of Currency, the Federal Reserve Board of Governors, and the Federal Open Market Committee all together impact the payment systems used for settlement on securities markets, both directly by regulations and indirectly via monetary policy which affects the value of the dollar.

==== Regulators of Comodity Futures ====
The Commodity Futures Trading Commission (CFTC) is an important regulator for commodities futures and options.

==== Regulators of securities ====
The U.S. Securities and Exchange Commission (SEC) is the most important federal regulator of corporate stocks, as well as other securities.

=== National ticker tape services ===
One of the most important elements of the National Market System is that all qualified trades are reported onto a consolidated system.

=== Clearing corporations ===
- Depository Trust & Clearing Corporation
- National Securities Clearing Corporation
- Fixed Income Clearing Corporation
- Options Clearing Corporation
- Depository Trust Company

=== Settlement facilities ===
- DTC Screen
- Fedwire
- DRS & FAST

=== Custody system ===
- Cede and Company
- Broadridge

== See also ==
- List of stock exchanges
- List of stock exchanges in the Americas
