= Pipeline Trading Systems =

Pipeline Trading Systems LLC operated private equities and options trading systems from 2004 to 2012. As an agency broker, it offered equities traders two methods for trading large blocks of stock with minimal impact on price: a crossing network (also known as a dark pool), and an algorithm switching engine. In 2011, it agreed to settle the action brought by the Securities and Exchange Commission regarding the disclosure of the activities of its liquidity providing affiliate between 2004 and 2010.

The affiliate implemented a patented market structure invention that used an execution quality rebate to align the liquidity provider's incentives with those of Pipeline's institutional clients. The crossing system earned high marks for execution quality in third party research, but was shut down in 2012 following the SEC action.

Pipeline was founded by Fred Federspiel, a nuclear physicist and complexity scientist, and Alfred Berkeley, a former president and vice chairman of NASDAQ. Following its settlement in 2011, the company rebranded itself in January 2012 and now operates as Aritas Securities LLC.
