= Firstpex =

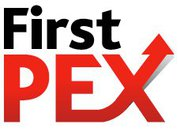
- Industry: Private equity
- Founded: 2011
- Founder: Patrick Gruhn
- Defunct: 2016
- Website: www.firstpex.com (site no longer exists)

FirstPEX was a private electronic market for private equity transactions based in Switzerland.

== History ==
The platform was founded by Patrick Gruhn in 2011. At the time of its launch, it was compared to the American SecondMarket. Through a partnership with UK-based Autumn Capital Partners the platform was expanded outside of Switzerland to the rest of Europe. The platform was not subject to the regulatory supervision by the Swiss Financial Market Supervisory Authority (FINMA); however it was subject to authorization in Europe.

The company was dissolved in 2016.

== Features ==
The site required users to purchase a paid membership in order to trade. It allows qualified investors to buy and sell equities in privately owned to each other through a bidding process which enables the parties to find a mutually agreeable price. The site's primary userbase was made up of entrepreneurs, investors and business owners, in which negotiations and the exchange of information on investment transactions is covered prior to closing transactions.

The site also allowed users to trade in non-liquid assets. The site was based on the Django web framework, and had functionality to navigate through listings according to various of criteria such as asset class, investment volume, country of origin, sector and industry. Its features also included a live chat and a data room for the secure sharing of files.
