= Lit pool =

Type of stock exchange

Lit pools, also called lit markets, are a type of stock exchange. They are effectively the opposite of dark pools or dark liquidity. Whereas ‘dark’ venues do not display prices at which participants are willing to trade, lit pools do show these various bids and offers in different company shares. Primary exchanges operate in such a way that available liquidity is displayed at all times and form the bulk of the lit pools available to traders. The majority of trades, 70%, are transacted over lit pools. Lit pools are closer to what is generally considered the ideal market, due to their transparency.

Whether a market is a lit or dark pool has implications for optimal trading strategies, which are debated by scholars as well as market participants.
