= Implementation shortfall =

Financial concept

In financial markets, implementation shortfall is the difference between the decision price and the final execution price (including commissions, taxes, etc.) for a trade. This is also known as the "slippage". Agency trading is largely concerned with minimizing implementation shortfall and finding liquidity.

== Decision price ==
The decision price is the price of the stock that prompted the decision to buy or sell. The most common decision price is the close price or the arrival price. If we split the decision to buy a stock from the actual trading of the stock, as is often the case with fund managers (decision makers) and brokers (trade executors), you can see why both are used.

From the fund manager's point of view, his decision to trade is often based on the closing price of the day's trading (along with the entire history of the stock and other signals/indicators). When he decides to buy a particular stock the next day, it is because he believes that the price will go up from that closing price. Thus his decision price is the close price.

However the broker, unless she is explicitly told what levels to buy at or what prompted the desire to buy, does not know when or why the decision was made. Her best guess is that the current price at the time the order is received is what prompted the decision and thus her decision price is the arrival price. There is no common definition of this price, but the broker normally uses the last traded price or the "mid price" - equal to the average of the current bid and ask prices being quoted at the time the order was received.

Brokerage firms specialize in developing algorithmic strategies, and providing them to the institutional investment community, that aid in the quest to minimise slippage from benchmarks such as implementation shortfall, volume-weighted average price or time-weighted average price. Alpha Profiling is an example of an algorithmic method of minimising implementation shortfall.

== Cost components ==
Implementation shortfall can be decomposed into delay cost, execution cost, and opportunity cost. Delay cost arises when an order is not submitted to the market at the time of the portfolio manager's investment decision. Execution cost reflects the price impact and market risk associated with completing the trade. Opportunity cost arises when some or all of the intended order is not executed because of adverse price movement or insufficient liquidity.

This decomposition is used in transaction cost analysis to evaluate execution quality and to assess the performance of traders, brokers, venues, or algorithms. It also helps distinguish costs caused by waiting to trade, costs caused by the act of trading, and costs caused by failing to complete the intended order.

== See also ==
- Algorithmic trading
- Market impact
- Market microstructure
