= Securities Acts Amendments of 1975 =

The Securities Acts Amendments of 1975 is a U.S. federal law that amended the Securities Act of 1933 and the Securities Exchange Act of 1934. It was enacted by the 94th United States Congress and signed into law by President Gerald Ford on June 4, 1975. The Securities Acts Amendments imposed an obligation on the Securities and Exchange Commission to consider the impacts that any new regulation would have on competition. The law also empowered the Securities and Exchange Commission (SEC) to establish a national market system and a system for nationwide clearance and settlement of securities transactions, enabling the SEC to enact Regulation NMS, and created the Municipal Securities Rulemaking Board (MSRB), a self-regulatory organization that writes investor protection rules and other rules regulating broker-dealers and banks in the United States municipal securities market.

== See also ==
- National Market System
