= Multilateral trading facility =

Type of financial trading venue

A multilateral trading facility (MTF) is a European Union regulatory term for a self-regulated financial trading venue. These are alternatives to the traditional stock exchanges where a market is made in securities, typically using electronic systems. The concept was introduced within the Markets in Financial Instruments Directive (MiFID), a European Directive designed to harmonise retail investors protection and allow investment firms to provide services throughout the EU.

Article 4 (15) of MiFID describes MTF as a “multilateral system, operated by an investment firm or a market operator, which brings together multiple third-party buying and selling interests in financial instruments – in the system and in accordance with non-discretionary rules – in a way that results in a contract”. The term 'non-discretionary rules' means that the investment firm operating an MTF has no discretion as to how interests may interact. Interests are brought together by forming a contract and the execution takes place under the system's rules or by means of the system's protocols or internal operating procedures.

The MTF can be operated by a market operator or an investment firm whereas the operation of a regulated market is not considered an investment service and is carried out exclusively by market operators that are authorised to do so. The United States equivalent is an alternative trading system.

== History ==
Before the introduction of MiFID trading in stocks and shares was typically centred on large national stock exchanges, such as London Stock Exchange (LSE), Deutsche Börse and Euronext. The rules for operating exchanges varied from country to country, with some exchanges granted exclusivity over certain services for that country's market. Consequently, European share trading tended to be conducted on one specific venue, like the Euronext Paris market for French securities or the LSE for United Kingdom securities.

MiFID II classified three types of trading venue:

- A regulated market (RM) run by a market operator
- A multilateral trading facility (MTF)
- An organised trading facility (OTF)

Permission to run any of the three types of service was required from an appropriate regulator, with the existing exchanges registering as regulated markets.

== Comparison with "regulated markets" ==
MTFs are a kind of "exchange lite" because they provide similar or competing trading services and have similar structures, like rulebooks and market surveillance departments.

Market operators are also arbiters for securities. Companies wishing to list upon a regulated market undergo a listing process and pay fees; this allows the operator to ensure that only appropriate securities are available for trading. This may involve requirements about the number of shares that are available, standards around how the accounts of the company are maintained or strict rules about how news is released to the market.

Whether or not a security has been "admitted to trading on a regulated market" is a key concept within MiFID, and is fundamental in how the rules apply to trading in the security. MTFs do not have a standard listing process and cannot change the regulatory status of a security.

== Operating rules ==
MiFID lays out a number of obligations for an MTF to operate:

- It must be pre-trade transparent, the price of existing orders must be made available on market data feeds.
  - An MTF may be exempted from pre-trade transparency via use of an appropriate waiver, such as a large in size waiver or price referencing waiver - in this case the MTF will be a dark pool.
- It must be post-trade transparent, any trades carried out on the platform must be published in real-time.
- Prices and charges must be public and applied consistently across all members.
- There must be a rulebook advising how the system works and a means for applying for membership.

== Impact on European trading ==
New entrant MTFs have had a considerable impact on European share-trading. MiFID enabled trading venues to compete with one another. The legacy exchanges largely chose to keep to their existing business models and scope, but new entrant MTFs have made a significant impact. Chi-X Europe, the largest MTF by volume, is also the largest trading venue in Europe according to some statistics.

MTFs have been launched in other asset classes as well, one of the examples is LMAX Exchange an FCA regulated MTF for trading spot FX and precious metals.

This is part of a process known as fragmentation, where liquidity for one security is no-longer concentrated on one exchange but across multiple venues. This in turn forced traders to make use of more sophisticated trading strategies such as smart order routing.

=== Impact on fees ===
The new MTFs were notable for:

- High trading speeds, using technology to make their platforms attractive to high frequency traders;
- Low cost bases, running their organisations with minimal headcount;
- Maker/taker pricing, paying members to trade on the platform as long as the trading adds liquidity rather than takes it;
- Trading incentives, often called jump-balls, in which stakes are given to trading members in return for volume traded.

These all made the new venues highly attractive and to take market share. In turn, existing venues were forced to discount heavily, significantly impacting revenues.

=== Limited individual success ===
Although they have forced significant adjustments within the equity trading markets, the MTFs themselves have had limited success. Chi-X Europe claims to be profitable, however Nasdaq OMX Europe was shut down in 2010 and Turquoise was bought by the LSE.

Many consider the MTF business model unsustainable, although Alisdair Haynes, the Chi-X Europe CEO, said "We are not going to raise prices, though most people expect we have to".

=== Investment bank MTFs ===
Most investment banks run an internal crossing system. These systems cross clients' orders against one another, or fill the orders directly off the bank's book.

Nomura has converted its internal crossing system, NX, into an MTF. Nomura said its decision was for "commercial purposes". UBS has established UBS MTF, this works in conjunction with its crossing system, UBS PIN. Goldman Sachs has also announced that it will launch an MTF.

The exact regulatory status of broker crossing systems is a matter of debate and controversy. It is expected to be an area of future regulatory intervention.

== See also ==
- Alternative trading system
- Electronic communication network
- Swap execution facility
- Crossing network
- Dark pool
- Electronic trading platform
