= Funding liquidity =

Ability of a financial institution to meet its payment obligations when due

Funding liquidity is the availability of credit to finance the purchase of financial assets. The International Monetary Fund (IMF) defines funding liquidity as "the ability of a solvent institution to make agreed-upon payments in a timely fashion". In practice, funding liquidity refers to whether a bank or financial institution can meet its payment obligations at a given point in time.

== Sources of funding ==
Liquidity is the key source of revenue for banks, and can be provided by either depositors or markets. Examples of fund sources include selling of assets and securities, syndicated loans, secondary market mortgages, capital markets, interbank market, and capital by borrowing from a central bank.

The relationship between funding liquidity and market liquidity is an important indicator of financial market development and activity. Funding liquidity is related to the degree of freedom and economic efficiency in relation to the borrowing of financial assets, whereas market liquidity is related to selling of financial assets.

== Funding liquidity risk ==
The possibility that a bank could become unable to settle obligations with immediacy is called Funding Liquidity Risk. Funding liquidity is essentially a binary concept: a bank can either settle obligations or it cannot. Funding liquidity risk, however, can take infinitely many values because it is related to the distribution of future outcomes. A different time scale is implicit in this distinction. Funding liquidity is associated with one particular point in time. Conversely, funding liquidity risk is always forward-looking and measured over a specific horizon. In this respect, concerns about the future ability to settle obligations, like future funding liquidity, will affect current funding liquidity risk. The distinction between liquidity and liquidity risk is straightforward and analogous to other risks.

The liquidity and profitability of the funding vary inversely. If cash is the most liquid asset and a non-profit asset at the same time, it is unlikely to bring benefits to an enterprise.
