= National best bid and offer =

National Best Bid and Offer (NBBO) is a regulation by the United States Securities and Exchange Commission that requires brokers to execute customer trades at the best available (lowest) ask price when buying securities, and the best available (highest) bid price when selling securities, as governed by Regulation NMS.

For example, if the offer (or "ask") price for a stock is $25.00 for 100 shares of a stock on one exchange and $24.50 for 100 shares of the same stock on another exchange, and a broker has a customer who wishes to purchase 150 shares of the stock, then the broker is required to purchase all of the shares available at $24.50 on behalf of the customer before purchasing any of the shares available at $25.00. Additionally, if an order for 150 shares is sent directly to the first exchange, it is required under most circumstances to route the first 100 shares of the order to the other exchange, where the shares are available at a cheaper price.
