= Volume-weighted average price =

Financial quantity

In finance, volume-weighted average price (VWAP) is the ratio of the total value traded in a security to the total volume of transactions over a defined period, typically a single trading session. It is a measure of the average price at which the security has traded during that period, weighted by transaction size, and is used both as an execution benchmark and as a technical indicator.

== Calculation ==
VWAP is calculated as the cumulative value traded divided by the cumulative volume traded over the chosen window:

$$P_\mathrm{VWAP} = \frac{\sum_j P_j \, Q_j}{\sum_j Q_j}$$

where $P_j$ is the price of trade $j$, $Q_j$ is its quantity, and the sum runs over each individual trade in the defined period. Cross trades and basket cross trades are typically excluded. The indicator is usually computed for a single trading day but can in principle be measured between any two points in time.

== History ==
The first execution using VWAP as a benchmark is generally attributed to James Elkins, then head trader at the New York agency brokerage Abel Noser, who used it in 1984 for the Ford Motor Company pension fund. The concept was formalized academically in a 1988 Journal of Finance paper by Berkowitz, Logue, and Noser, which used VWAP as a yardstick for the total transaction cost of trading on the New York Stock Exchange.

== Uses ==
=== Execution benchmark ===
VWAP is widely used as a passive execution benchmark by institutional investors, particularly pension funds and some mutual funds, whose orders are large enough that trading them aggressively would move the market. The goal is to execute in proportion to traded volume so that the realized average price is close to the day's VWAP, which is taken to approximate the price that would have prevailed had the order not been traded. By spreading execution across the session, VWAP-targeting strategies are intended to minimize market impact costs, the adverse price movement caused by trading activity itself.

A broker may either guarantee execution at the day's VWAP (a "guaranteed VWAP" trade, with the broker bearing slippage risk for a higher commission) or work the order on a best-effort basis and report the achieved price relative to VWAP (a "VWAP target" execution). The difference between the executed price and the VWAP benchmark, known as VWAP slippage, is a standard measure of broker performance, and many buy-side firms now route orders to brokers algorithmically based on historical slippage.

=== Algorithmic execution ===
Trading algorithms that target VWAP belong to a class called volume participation algorithms. They forecast the intraday volume profile of the security and submit slices of the parent order in proportion to expected or realized volume. In a mathematical-finance treatment by Kato extending the Almgren-Chriss optimal-execution framework to include an explicit trading-volume process, VWAP-tracking execution is shown to be the optimal strategy for a risk-neutral trader. Cartea and Jaimungal subsequently derived a closed-form VWAP-targeting strategy under a more general microstructure model.

=== Technical indicator ===
VWAP is also used by discretionary traders as an intraday reference level. Prices trading above the day's VWAP are commonly interpreted as bullish and prices below it as bearish, in a manner analogous to a moving average. Some traders use crossings of price through the VWAP line as entry signals, initiating long positions on upward crossings and short positions on downward crossings. Because VWAP resets at the start of each session, it is mainly used for intraday rather than multi-day analysis.

== Variants ==
A time-weighted average price (TWAP) uses the same averaging concept but weights by elapsed time rather than volume; TWAP algorithms slice an order into equal-size pieces at regular intervals and are commonly used in markets with thin or irregular volume. Anchored VWAP, developed by the technical analyst Paul Levine in the mid-1990s as part of his Market Interpretation/Data Analysis System (MIDAS) and later popularized by Brian Shannon, fixes the starting point of the calculation to a user-chosen event (such as an earnings release or a swing high or low) rather than the start of the session, allowing the indicator to be applied over multi-day windows.

== See also ==
- Average price
- Algorithmic trading
- Almgren-Chriss model
- Market impact
- Transaction cost
