= Regulation NMS =

US financial regulation

Regulation National Market System (or Reg NMS) is a 2005 US financial regulation promulgated and described by the Securities and Exchange Commission (SEC) as "a series of initiatives designed to modernize and strengthen the National Market System for equity securities". The Reg NMS is intended to assure that investors receive the best (NBBO) price executions for their orders by encouraging competition in the marketplace. Some contend that the rule has contributed to the rise of high-frequency trading, which is sometimes regarded as controversial.

== History ==
Established in 2005, its aim was to foster both "competition among individual markets and competition among individual orders" in order to promote efficient and fair price formation across securities markets.

In 1972, before the SEC began its pursuit of a national market system, the market for securities was quite fragmented. The same stock sometimes traded at different prices at different trading venues, and the NYSE ticker tape did not report transactions of NYSE-listed stocks that took place on regional exchanges or on other over-the-counter securities markets. This fragmentation made it difficult for traders to comparison shop. In 1975, Congress passed the Securities Acts Amendments of 1975, authorizing the SEC to facilitate a national market system.

== Consolidation of rules ==
In 2005, the rules promoting the national market system were consolidated into REG NMS. Some of the more notable rules include:

- Access Rule – addresses access to market data such as quotations (Rule 610)
- Order Protection (or Trade Through) Rule – provides intermarket price priority for quotations that are immediately and automatically accessible (Rule 611)
- Sub-Penny Rule – establishes minimum pricing increments (Rule 612)
- Market Data Rules:
  - a) Allocation amendment – institutes a new Market Data Revenue Allocation Formula,
  - b) Governance amendment – creates advisory committees,
  - c) Distribution and Display Rules – governing market data (Rule 600, 601 & 603).

== Impact ==
Reg NMS has been described as a shift away from the SEC's historical role of defining and then enforcing general duties and obligations of market participants. Instead, Reg NMS dictates the specifics of how the market should execute trades. This "micromanagement" of complicated market mechanics has been blamed for unintended consequences, including the rise of high-frequency trading.

Within Reg NMS, a section called the order protection rule has further been controversial because it requires traders to transact on a trading venue at the lowest price rather than on a venue offering the quickest execution or the most reliability, which can result in a worse overall price for institutional orders after execution. Additionally, the order protection rule has been blamed for exacerbating market fragmentation, resulting in rising technology and exchange costs for market makers. Thus, some have described it as an improper government intervention into private business affairs. Defenders of the rule argue that it really just requires what brokers should be doing if they are acting in their customer's best interests. Still others have argued that the rule is too lax because it only protects the quotes at the top of the book. For example, if the best two quotes in one market are superior to the best quote in another market, a portion of an incoming market order may still trade at the inferior market at the inferior price even though the second best quote on the superior market is still available. If more than just the top of the book (the best quote) were protected by the order rule, the market order would have transacted at a superior price and the limit order offering the superior price would have transacted more quickly.

=== Firms affected ===
- SROs/Exchanges
- ECNs and other executing broker-dealers (e.g., market makers, block positioners)
- Broker-dealers routing ISOs

== See also ==
- MiFID (Analogue of Reg NMS in Europe)
- National Market System
- National market system plan
- Alternative trading system
