= Liquidnet =

US registered global investment broker

- Industry: Brokerage
- Founded: April 2001; 25 years ago
- Founder: Seth Merrin
- Headquarters: New York City, United States
- Key people: Seth Merrin (Founder & CEO); Brian Conroy (President); Mark Pumfrey (Global Head of Equities); Constantinos Antoniades (Global Head of Fixed Income)
- Parent: TP ICAP
- Website: www.liquidnet.com

Liquidnet is a global institutional trading and investment network that connects asset managers with liquidity. Founded in 2001, the company provides electronic services for more than 1,000 asset management firms across 46 markets.

The platform is designed for institutional investors seeking liquidity for large trade sizes. Liquidnet is headquartered in New York City and operates as a subsidiary of TP ICAP, which acquired the firm in 2021. Liquidnet also has offices in Boston, Dublin, London, San Francisco, Hong Kong, Singapore, Sydney, Tokyo, and Toronto.

== History ==
Liquidnet was founded in April 2001 by Seth Merrin as a wholesale electronic marketplace where institutional investors could anonymously trade large blocks of company shares.

Merrin estimated that the network needed at least 100 buy side firms live on Day One to create a critical mass. This number was revised to 75, but the company ultimately launched with only 38 institutions. In 2002, Liquidnet Europe launched with nine member firms, with Liquidnet Asia launching with 26 member firms in 2007, bringing its global reach to 28 markets.

In the U.S., Liquidnet's average execution size of 50,000 shares is 200 times the size of the 250-share average traded in all lit and dark venues. Liquidnet's average execution in international equities is reportedly 100 times larger than the average.

Liquidnet has an Equity Capital Markets and Issuer Services group which leverages its community of institutional investors to determine institutional demand for a stock.

In January 2010, Liquidnet announced a strategic investment in OTR Global LLC, a securities research and brokerage firm.

In October 2011, Liquidnet launched a private shares market. As part of Liquidnet's equity capital markets division, the Private Shares group works with institutional investors and companies looking to trade private shares.

In July 2011, SIX Swiss Exchange and Liquidnet launched a platform for non-displayed equity block trading. The platform allows SIX Swiss Exchange members and Liquidnet's buy side members to execute large block trades.

In March 2014, Liquidnet acquired bond trading platform Vega-Chi, with trading facilities for high yield bonds and convertible bonds.

In May 2017, Liquidnet acquired OTAS Technologies, a market-leading analytics platform that delivers actionable market intelligence and context directly to institutional traders and portfolio managers.

In May 2019, Liquidnet acquired RSRCHXchange, a marketplace and aggregator for institutional research to help embed a new level of research and analytics into the investment process.

In June 2019, Liquidnet acquired Prattle, a provider of automated investment research solutions for portfolio managers, research analysts, and other financial professionals.

In February 2020, founder Seth Merrin stepped down as CEO of Liquidnet. Company President Brian Conroy has been selected as his successor.

In September and October 2020, TP ICAP announced plans to acquire Liquidnet. Further details were provided in June 2021. In February 2021, shareholders approved the deal. In March 2021, TP ICAP announced the completion of its acquisition of Liquidnet.

In September 2021, Liquidnet delved further into electronic trading with a new primary markets offering.

In November 2021, The Times of London reported that Liquidnet was suffering from low revenues and that this was hurting TP ICAP overall.

In December 2021, Liquidnet expanded the services it offered in fixed income and equities to different European countries, including France, Spain, Germany, and Denmark. Also that month, Euromoney reported that the firm was aiming to digitize primary bond markets.

In February 2022, TP ICAP announced a new feature connecting directly buy-side and syndicate banks via their order management and execution systems (OEMS), expanding on an offering announced the previous September.

In March 2022, Liquidnet expanded its emerging market bond offerings with access to South Africa. Also that month, the Financial Times reported that activist hedge fund Phase 2 Partners was urging the parent company, TP ICAP, to sell itself.

In April 2022, Liquidnet expanded its new issue trading protocol that would allow dealers to trade directly alongside the buy-side, another step in its electronic efforts announced in September 2021. The company also announced a collaboration with NowCM, a system and infrastructure provider for primary debt markets, to speed up new issue workflow.

In September 2022, the company announced it was joining Sustainable Trading, a non-profit focused on environmental, social, and governance issues that aims to drive changes around sustainability and outside of regulation.
