= Market liquidity =

Finance property of an asset

In business, economics or investment, market liquidity is a market's feature whereby an individual or firm can quickly purchase or sell an asset without causing a drastic change in the asset's price. Liquidity involves the trade-off between the price at which an asset can be sold, and how quickly it can be sold. In a liquid market, the trade-off is mild: one can sell quickly without having to accept a significantly lower price. In a relatively illiquid market, an asset must be discounted in order to sell quickly. A liquid asset is an asset which can be converted into cash within a relatively short period of time, or cash itself, which can be considered the most liquid asset because it can be exchanged for goods and services instantly at face value.

== Overview ==
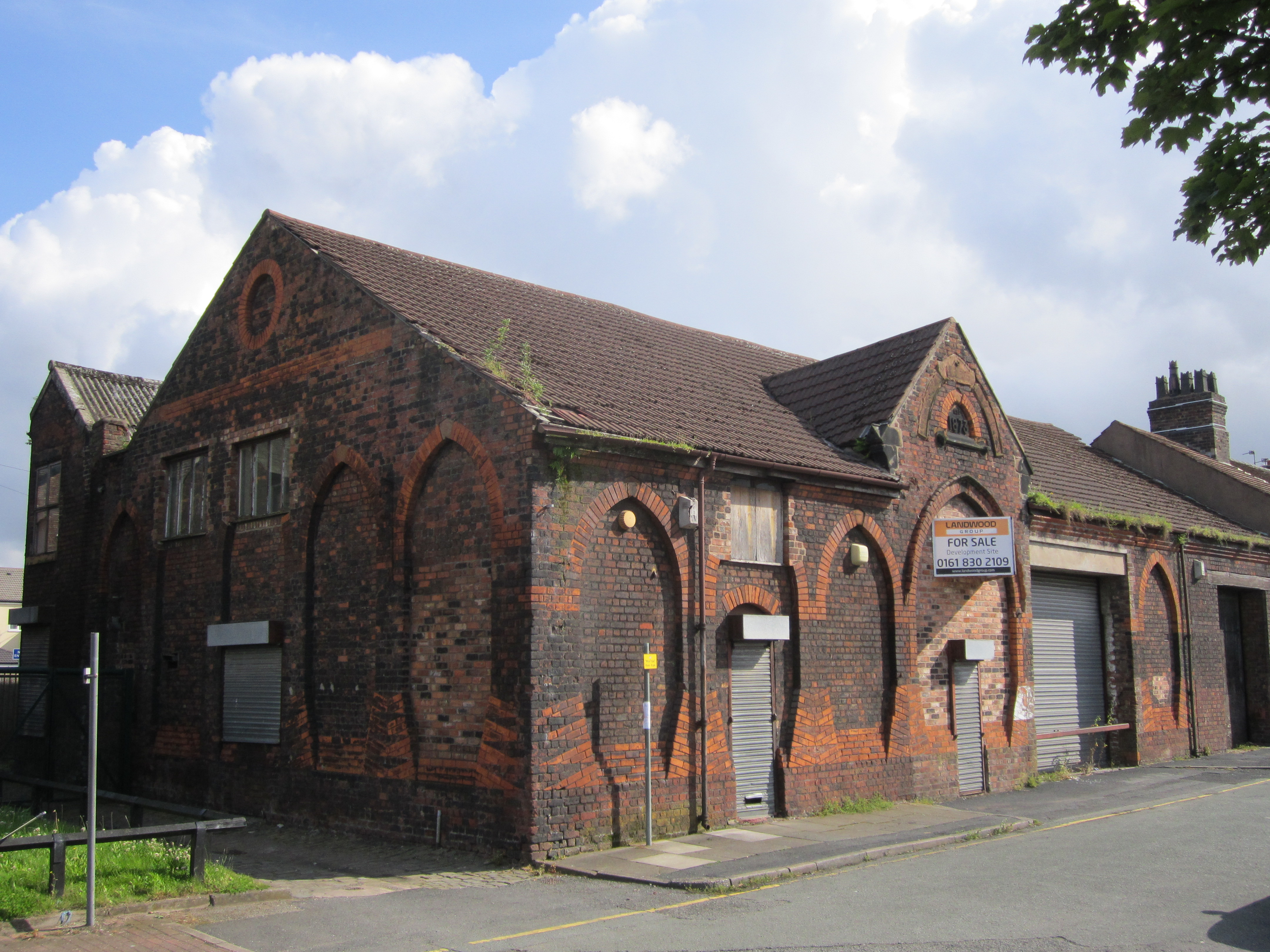
This old building for sale in Cheshire, England, has relatively low liquidity. It could be sold in a matter of days at a low price, but it could take several years to find a buyer who is willing to pay a high price.

A liquid market allows assets to be bought or sold promptly, at low cost, and near the current market price. The essential characteristic of a liquid market is that there are always ready and willing buyers and sellers. It is similar to, but distinct from, market depth, which relates to the trade-off between quantity being sold and the price it can be sold for, rather than the liquidity trade-off between speed of sale and the price it can be sold for. A market may be considered both deep and liquid if there are ready and willing buyers and sellers in large quantities.

An illiquid asset is an asset which is not readily salable (without a drastic price reduction, and sometimes not at any price) due to uncertainty about its value or the lack of a market in which it is regularly traded. The mortgage-related assets which resulted in the subprime mortgage crisis are examples of illiquid assets, as their value was not readily determinable despite being secured by real property. Before the crisis, they had moderate liquidity because it was believed that their value was generally known.

Speculators and market makers are key contributors to the liquidity of a market or asset. Speculators are individuals or institutions that seek to profit from anticipated increases or decreases in a particular market price. Market makers seek to profit by charging for the immediacy of execution: either implicitly by earning a bid/ask spread or explicitly by charging execution commissions. By doing this, they provide the capital needed to facilitate the liquidity. The risk of illiquidity does not apply only to individual investments: whole portfolios are subject to market risk. Financial institutions and asset managers that oversee portfolios are subject to what is called "structural" and "contingent" liquidity risk. Structural liquidity risk, sometimes called funding liquidity risk, is the risk associated with funding asset portfolios in the normal course of business. Contingent liquidity risk is the risk associated with finding additional funds or replacing maturing liabilities under potential, future-stressed market conditions. When a central bank tries to influence the liquidity (supply) of money, this process is known as open market operations.

== Effect on asset values ==
The market liquidity of assets affects their prices and expected returns. Theory and empirical evidence suggest that investors require higher returns on assets with lower market liquidity to compensate them for the higher cost of trading these assets. That is, for an asset with given cash flow, the higher its market liquidity, the higher its price and the lower is its expected return. In addition, risk-averse investors require higher expected return if the asset's market-liquidity risk is greater. This risk involves the exposure of the asset return to shocks in overall market liquidity, the exposure of the asset's own liquidity to shocks in market liquidity and the effect of market return on the asset's own liquidity. Here too, the higher the liquidity risk, the higher the expected return on the asset or the lower is its price.

One example of this is a comparison of assets with and without a liquid secondary market. The liquidity discount is the reduced promised yield or expected return for such assets, like the difference between newly issued U.S. Treasury bonds compared to off the run treasuries with the same term to maturity. Initial buyers know that other investors are less willing to buy off-the-run treasuries, so the newly issued bonds have a higher price (and hence lower yield).

== Futures ==
In the futures markets, there is no assurance that a liquid market may exist for offsetting a commodity contract at all times. Some future contracts and specific delivery months tend to have increasingly more trading activity and have higher liquidity than others. The most useful indicators of liquidity for these contracts are the trading volume and open interest.

There is also dark liquidity, referring to transactions that occur off-exchange and are therefore not visible to investors until after the transaction is complete. It does not contribute to public price discovery.

== Banking ==
In banking, liquidity is the ability to meet obligations when they come due without incurring unacceptable losses. Managing liquidity is a daily process requiring bankers to monitor and project cash flows to ensure adequate liquidity is maintained. Maintaining a balance between short-term assets and short-term liabilities is critical. For an individual bank, clients' deposits are its primary liabilities (in the sense that the bank is meant to give back all client deposits on demand), whereas reserves and loans are its primary assets (in the sense that these loans are owed to the bank, not by the bank). The investment portfolio represents a smaller portion of assets, and serves as the primary source of liquidity. Investment securities can be liquidated to satisfy deposit withdrawals and increased loan demand. Banks have several additional options for generating liquidity, such as selling loans, borrowing from other banks, borrowing from a central bank, such as the US Federal Reserve bank, and raising additional capital. In a worst-case scenario, depositors may demand their funds when the bank is unable to generate adequate cash without incurring substantial financial losses. In severe cases, this may result in a bank run.

Banks can generally maintain as much liquidity as desired because bank deposits are insured by governments in most developed countries. A lack of liquidity can be remedied by raising deposit rates and effectively marketing deposit products. However, an important measure of a bank's value and success is the cost of liquidity. A bank can attract significant liquid funds. Lower costs generate stronger profits, more stability, and more confidence among depositors, investors, and regulators.

== Stock market ==
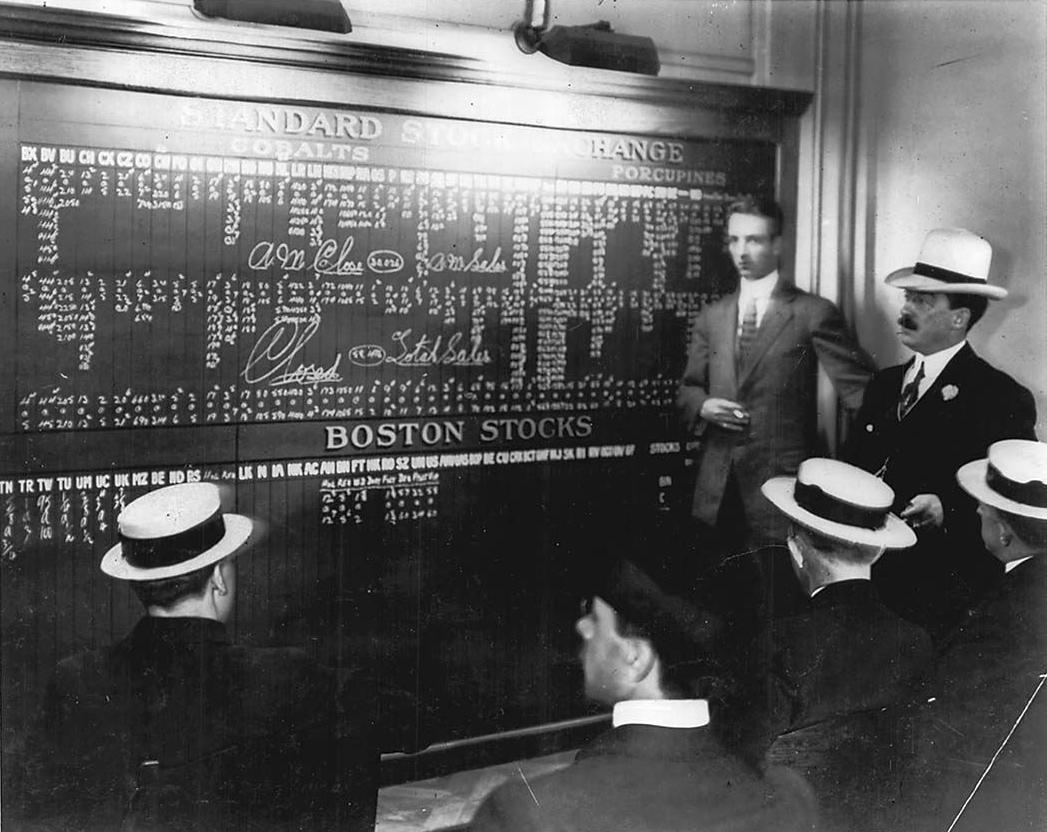
Stock exchanges promote liquidity by accepting competitive bids from buyers. (Toronto Stock Exchange, 1910)

The market liquidity of stock depends on whether it is listed on an exchange and the level of buyer interest. The bid/ask spread is one indicator of a stock's liquidity. For liquid stocks, such as Microsoft or General Electric, the spread is often just a few pennies – much less than 1% of the price. For illiquid stocks, the spread can be much larger, amounting to a few percent of the trading price.

== See also ==
- Funding liquidity
- Market impact

== Sources ==
- "Liquidity: Finance in motion or evaporation", lecture by Michael Mainelli at Gresham College, 5 September 2007 (available for download as an audio or video file, as well as a text file)
- The role of time-critical liquidity in financial markets by David Marshall and Robert Steigerwald (Federal Reserve Bank of Chicago)
- Financial market utilities and the challenge of just-in-time liquidity by Richard Heckinger, David Marshall, and Robert Steigerwald (Federal Reserve Bank of Chicago)
