= Investment Technology Group =

American firm

Investment Technology Group, Inc.
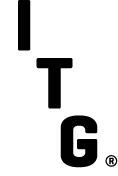
- Type: Subsidiary
- Industry: Financial services
- Founded: 1987; 39 years ago
- Headquarters: One Liberty Plaza New York City, USA
- Key people: Francis J. Troise (CEO), Minder Cheng (Chairman of the board), Steven Vigliotti(CFO)
- Products: Brokerage, market technology
- Revenue: ▲US$559.8 million (2014)
- Net income: ▲US$50.9 million (2014)
- Total assets: ▲US$1,350 million (2014)
- Total equity: ▲US$415.6 million (2014)
- Number of employees: 883 (2019)
- Parent: Virtu Financial
- Website: www.itg.com

Investment Technology Group, Inc. was a United States–based multinational agency brokerage and financial markets technology firm aimed at a hedge fund and asset management clientele. One of the first suppliers of electronic trading services, ITG launched the industry’s second anonymous electronic trade matching system, POSIT, in 1987 (Instinet Cross was launched in 1986). ITG has since expanded its business to include tools for portfolio management, pre-trade analysis, order management, trade execution, and post-trade evaluation.

ITG is headquartered in New York City and has offices in locations including Boston, Los Angeles, Toronto, Chicago, London, Dublin, Tel Aviv, Madrid, Sydney, Hong Kong and Singapore.

== History ==
ITG was founded in 1987 as a division of Jefferies to provide automated equity trading to institutional investors. That year, the company introduced POSIT, an anonymous electronic trade matching system, in conjunction with Barra.

In 1990, ITG launched QuantEX, a trading system for institutional traders integrating analytics, routing, and trade management. ITG began to provide clients with pre- and post-trade tools and analytics in 1992.

ITG became a publicly traded company in 1994, listed on NASDAQ. The ITG Australia office opened in 1997, giving regional investors POSIT equity crossing. The firm expanded into Europe in 1998. In 1999, ITG completed its spin-off from Jefferies, giving it full independence.

In 2000, the company’s Canada office opened. In 2002, ITG moved into the hedge fund market by acquiring Hoenig, a provider of trade execution and research services to alternative investment funds. The firm then opened an office in Hong Kong.

ITG completed its purchase of Radical Corporation, a provider of direct access trading to the institutional brokerage and hedge fund community, in 2004. The firm then opened a Japan office in 2005. The company moved to increase its transaction cost analysis offering when it acquired Plexus Group from JPMorgan Chase in 2006. That same year, ITG acquired Macgregor, a provider of trade order management systems, for $230 million. In 2007, it acquired RedSky Financial, a developer of futures and options trading technology.

In 2007 the company came under pressure from activist hedge fund D. E. Shaw to either sell off some of its assets or initiate a share buyback. By February 2008, Shaw had reduced its stake, citing satisfaction with ITG's RedSky purchase and an announced $50 million stock repurchase program.

In 2010, ITG spun off Plexus Plan Sponsor Group, the division which serviced institutional asset owners. This group became privately held and was renamed Zeno Consulting Group.

On 1 March 2019 Virtu Financial completed the acquisition of ITG.

== Offerings ==
ITG's offerings span the following capabilities:

- Portfolio Management – tools to assist portfolio managers in optimizing investment performance as well as maintaining compliance with global regulatory, client and firm mandates.
- Pre-Trade – tools to manage trading risk, increase efficiency, and improve performance.
- Trade – electronic trading services which include broker-neutral, multi-asset execution management systems (EMS) and order management systems (OMS), algorithms and routers, POSIT crossing, FIX connectivity, and traditional desk services for the trading of single stocks, lists and programs, international securities, and specialized hedge fund services.
- Post-Trade – post-trade processing tools for trade matching, settlement notification and clearing and analysis tools for trading cost evaluation.
- Trading Research – Transaction cost analysis and consulting.
- Investment Research – Fundamental, data-driven equity research.
- Market Research – Healthcare and telecommunications primary research.
- POSIT Alert – tool that alerts traders to block crossing opportunities and delivers them directly to desktops from order flow in POSIT and ITG Algorithms.
