= Alternative trading system =

Non-exchange market trading venue

Alternative trading system (ATS) is a US and Canadian regulatory term for a non-exchange trading venue that matches buyers and sellers to find counterparties for transactions. Alternative trading systems are typically regulated as broker-dealers rather than as exchanges (although an alternative trading system can apply to be regulated as a securities exchange). In general, for regulatory purposes, an alternative trading system is an organization or system that provides or maintains a market place or facilities for bringing together purchasers and sellers of securities, but does not set rules for subscribers (other than rules for the conduct of subscribers trading on the system). An ATS must be approved by the United States Securities and Exchange Commission (SEC) and is an alternative to a traditional stock exchange. The equivalent term under European legislation is a multilateral trading facility (MTF).

These venues play an important role in public markets for allowing alternative means of accessing liquidity. They can be used for trading large blocks of shares away from the normal exchange, a practice that could otherwise skew the market price in a particular direction, depending on a security's market capitalization and trading volume. ATSs are generally electronic but don't have to be. ATSs can be distinguished from electronic communication networks (ECNs), which are a "fully electronic subset of ATSs that automatically and anonymously match orders".

In recent years, the SEC and other regulators have ramped up their enforcement activities with respect to alternative trading systems, initiating broad investigations and bringing actions for various violations, such as trading against customer order flow or permitting external vendors to retain and make use of confidential customer trading information in the vendor’s trading activities.

In January 2025, off-exchange trading volumes in US equity markets surpassed the on-exchange trading volumes.

== Legal definition ==
Rule 300(a) of the SEC's Regulation ATS provides the following legal definition of an "alternative trading system":

Any organization, association, person, group of persons, or system:

- That constitutes, maintains, or provides a market place or facilities for bringing together purchasers and sellers of securities or for otherwise performing with respect to securities the functions commonly performed by a stock exchange within the meaning of Rule 3b-16 of this chapter; and
- That does not:
1. Set rules governing the conduct of subscribers other than the conduct of such subscribers' trading on such organization, association, person, group of persons, or system; or
2. Discipline subscribers other than by exclusion from trading.

Regulation ATS was introduced by the SEC in 1998 and is designed to protect investors and resolve any concerns arising from this type of trading system. Regulation ATS requires stricter record keeping and demands more intensive reporting on issues such as transparency once the system reaches more than 5% of the trading volume for any given security.

Specifically, it requires that an alternative trading system comply with the reporting and record keeping requirements Rule 301 (b)(5)(ii) of Reg ATS, if during at least 4 of the preceding 6 calendar months, such alternative trading system had:

- With respect to any NMS stock, 5 percent or more of the average daily volume in that security reported by an effective transaction reporting plan;
- With respect to an equity security that is not an NMS stock and for which transactions are reported to a self-regulatory organization, 5 percent or more of the average daily trading volume in that security as calculated by the self-regulatory organization to which such transactions are reported;
- With respect to municipal securities, 5 percent or more of the average daily volume traded in the United States; or
- With respect to corporate debt securities, 5 percent or more of the average daily volume traded in the United States.

== Examples of ATS ==
- Electronic communication networks
- Call markets - An auction market where orders are grouped until they reach a certain amount, and then executed together at a predetermined time.
- Electronic trade matching
- Crossing networks
- Dark pools
