= Market depth =

Financial term

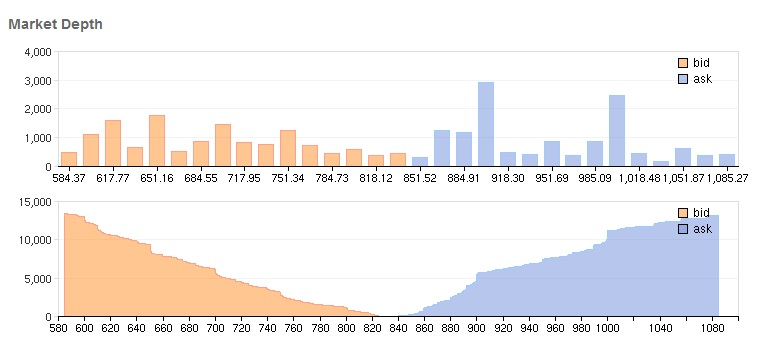

In finance, market depth is a real-time list displaying the quantity to be sold versus unit price. The list is organized by price level and is reflective of real-time market activity. Mathematically, it is the size of an order needed to move the market price by a given amount. If the market is deep, a large order is needed to change the price.

== Factors influencing market depth ==
- Tick size. This refers to the minimum price increment at which trades may be made on the market. The major stock markets in the United States went through a process of decimalisation in April 2001. This switched the minimum increment from a sixteenth to a one hundredth of a dollar. This decision improved market depth.
- Price movement restrictions. Most major financial markets do not allow completely free exchange of the products they trade, but instead restrict price movement in well-intentioned ways. These include session price change limits on major commodity markets and program trading curbs on the NYSE, which disallow certain large basket trades after the Dow Jones Industrial Average has moved up or down 200 points in a session.
- Trading restrictions. These include futures contract and options position limits as well as the widely used uptick rule for US stocks. These prevent market participants from adding to depth when they might otherwise choose to do so.
- Allowable leverage. Major markets and governing bodies typically set minimum margin requirements for trading various products. While this may act to stabilize the marketplace, it decreases the market depth simply because participants otherwise willing to take on very high leverage cannot do so without providing more capital.
- Market transparency. While the latest bid or ask price is usually available for most participants, additional information about the size of these offers and pending bids or offers that are not the best are sometimes hidden for reasons of technical complexity or simplicity. This decrease in available information can affect the willingness of participants to add to market depth.

In some cases, the term refers to financial data feeds available from exchanges or brokers. An example would be NASDAQ Level II quote data.
