= Time-weighted average price =

Average price of a security over a specified time

In finance, time-weighted average price (TWAP) is the average price of a security over a specified time.

TWAP is also sometimes used to describe a TWAP card, that is a strategy that will attempt to execute an order and achieve the TWAP or better. A TWAP strategy underpins more sophisticated ways of buying and selling than simply executing orders en masse: for example, dumping a huge number of shares in one block is likely to affect market perceptions, with an adverse effect on the price.

== Use ==
A TWAP strategy is often used to minimize a large order's impact on the market and result in price improvement. High-volume traders use TWAP to execute their orders over a specific time, so they trade to keep the price close to that which reflects the true market price. TWAP orders are a strategy of executing trades evenly over a specified time period. Volume-weighted average price (VWAP) balances execution with volume. Regularly, a VWAP trade will buy or sell 40% of a trade in the first half of the day and then the other 60% in the second half of the day. A TWAP trade would most likely execute an even 50/50 volume in the first and second half of the day.

== Formula ==
TWAP is calculated using the following formula:

$$P_{\mathrm{TWAP}} = \frac{\sum_{j}{P_j \cdot T_j}}{\sum_j{T_j}} \,$$

where:

$P_{\mathrm{TWAP}}$ is Time Weighted Average Price;
$P_j$ is the price of security at a time of measurement$j$;
$T_j$ is change of time since previous price measurement$j$;
$j$ is each individual measurement that takes place over the defined period of time.

Increased period of measurements $\sum_j{T_j}$ results in a less up-to-date price.

== See also ==
- Volume-weighted average price
- Slippage (finance)
