= Exchange (organized market) =

Highly organized trading market

An exchange, bourse (/bʊərs/), trading exchange or trading venue is an organized market where people can buy and sell financial instruments, such as tradable securities, commodities, foreign exchange and derivative contracts.

== History ==
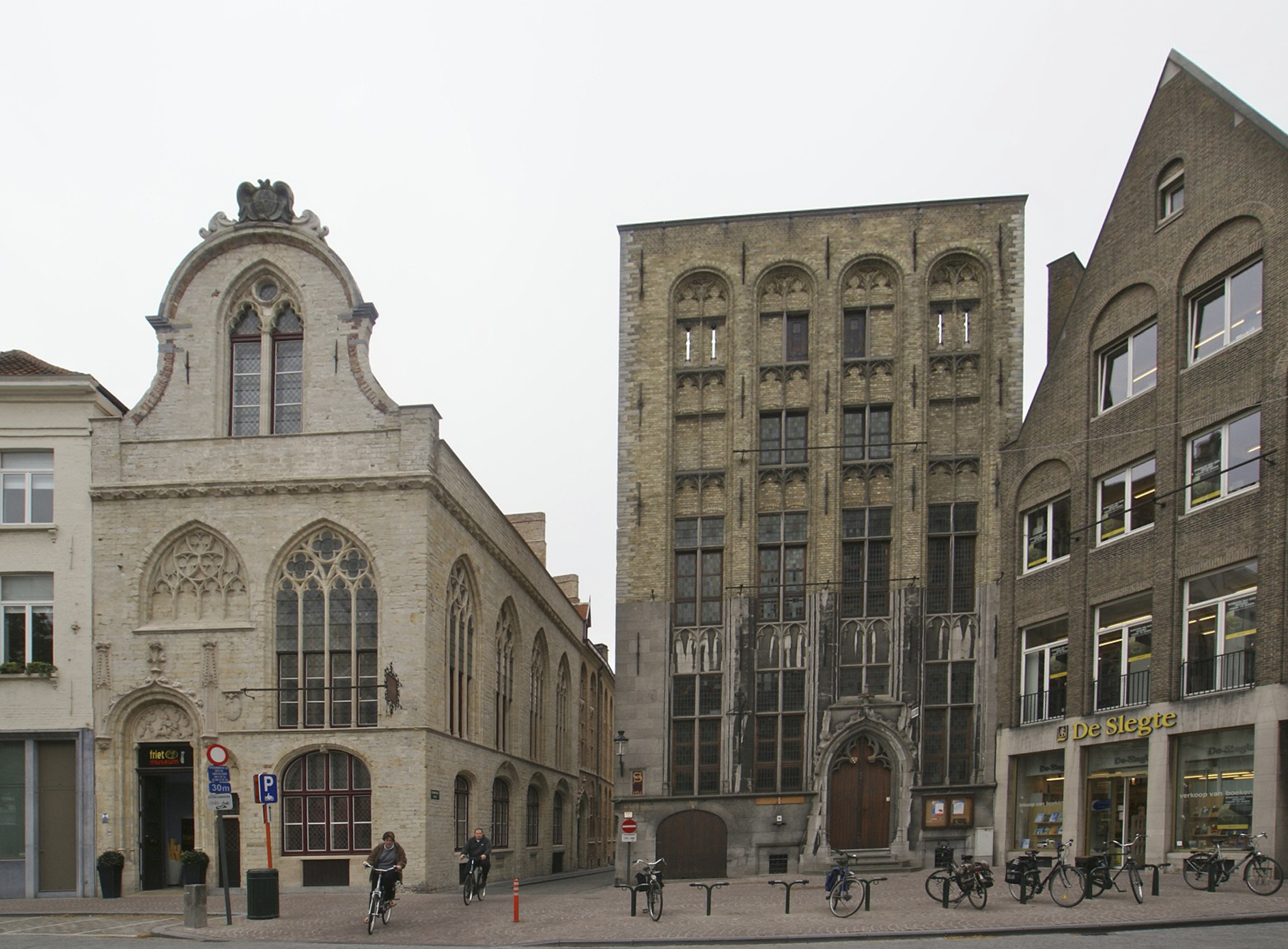
The "Huis ter Beurze" (center) in Bruges, Belgium

Coat of arms of the van der Beurze family, which depicts three purses (Flemish: buerzen, Greek: birsa, Latin: bursa) and thereby gave both the family its name and gave rise to the word 'bourse'

=== 12th century: Brokers on the Grand Bridge, France ===
In the twelfth century, foreign exchange dealers in France were responsible for controlling and regulating the debts of agricultural communities on behalf of banks. These were actually the first brokers. They met on the Grand Bridge in Paris, the current Pont au Change. It takes its name from the forex brokers.

=== 13th century: Huis ter Beurze, Belgium ===
The term bourse (Note: The term bourse is derived from (Ancient Greek: βύρσα, romanized: bursa, lit. '"the skin stripped off a hide"') which was later used as bursa in Medieval Latin to refer to the "purse".) is related to the 13th-century inn named "Huis ter Beurze" owned by Van der Beurze family in Bruges, Belgium, where traders and foreign merchants from across Europe, especially the Italian Republics of Genoa, Florence and Venice, conducted business in the late medieval period. The building, which was established by Robert van der Beurze as a hostelry, had operated from 1285. Its managers became famous for offering judicious financial advice to the traders and merchants who frequented the building. This service became known as the "Beurze Purse" which is the basis of bourse, meaning an organized place of exchange. Eventually, the building became solely a place for trading in commodities.

During the 18th century, the façade of the Huis ter Beurze was rebuilt with a wide frontage of pilasters. However, in 1947 it was restored to its original medieval appearance.

=== 13th century–17th century: Italian city-states, Belgium and the Netherlands ===
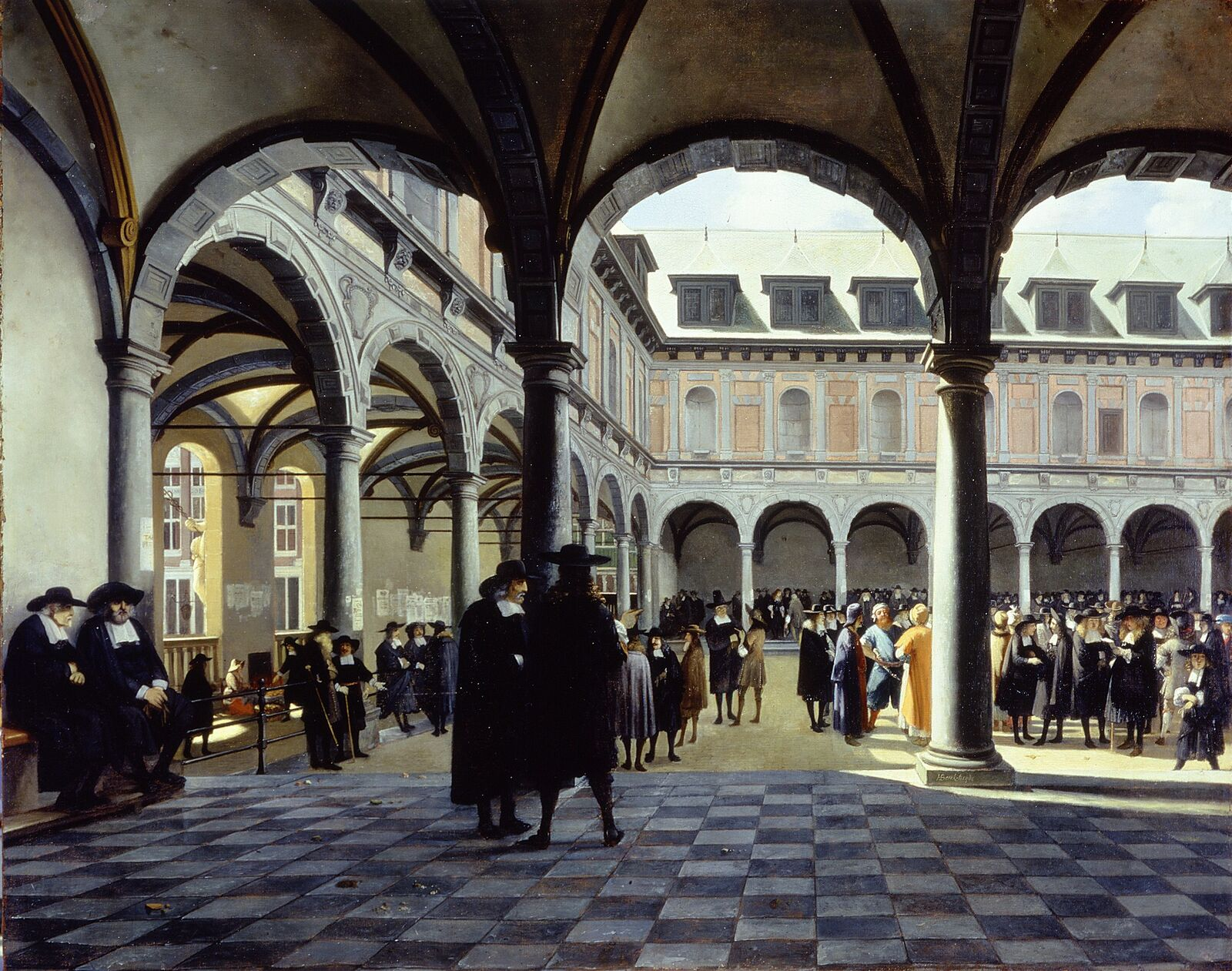
Courtyard of the Amsterdam Stock Exchange, circa 1670

In the thirteenth century, the Lombard bankers were the first to share state claims in Pisa, Genoa, and Florence. In 1409, the phenomenon was institutionalized by the creation of the Exchange Bruges. It was quickly followed by others, in Flanders and neighboring countries (Ghent and Amsterdam). It is still in Belgium and the first building designed to house a scholarship was built in Antwerp. The first scholarship organized in France was born in Lyon in 1540.

The Amsterdam Stock Exchange is considered the oldest "modern" securities market in the world. The first documented crash took place in the Dutch Republic in 1636. The prices of tulip bulbs reaching excessively high levels, known as the Tulip mania. The price collapsed on 1 October.

In the seventeenth century, the Dutch were the first to use the stock market to finance companies. The first company to issue stocks and bonds was the Dutch East India Company, introduced in 1602.

=== 17th century: England and France ===
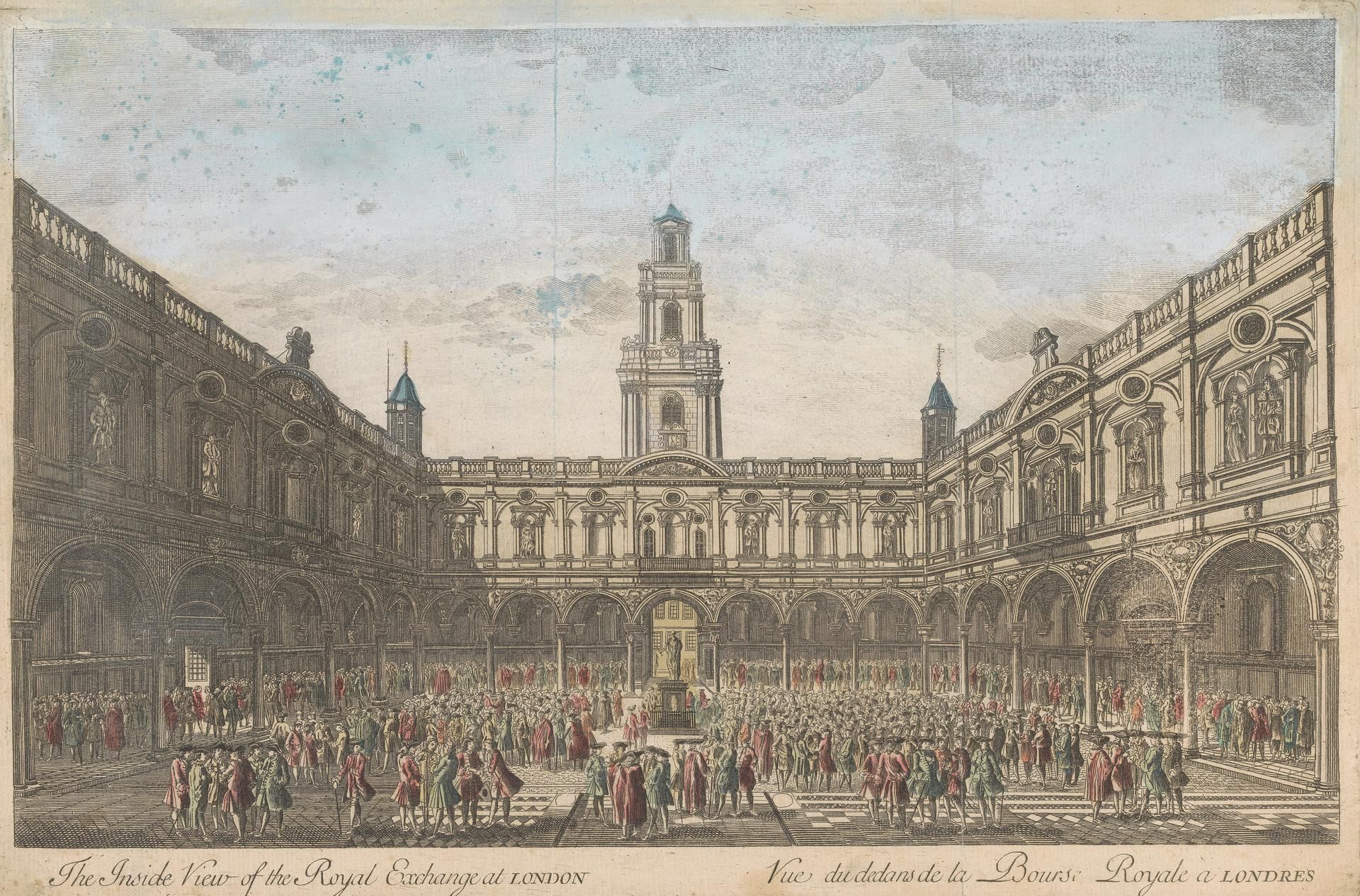
The Royal Exchange in London in the 18th century

The London Stock Exchange started operating and listing shares and bonds in 1688.

The Paris Stock Exchange was founded in 1724. In 1774, the courts required that it be shouted to improve the transparency of operations.

=== Contemporary history ===
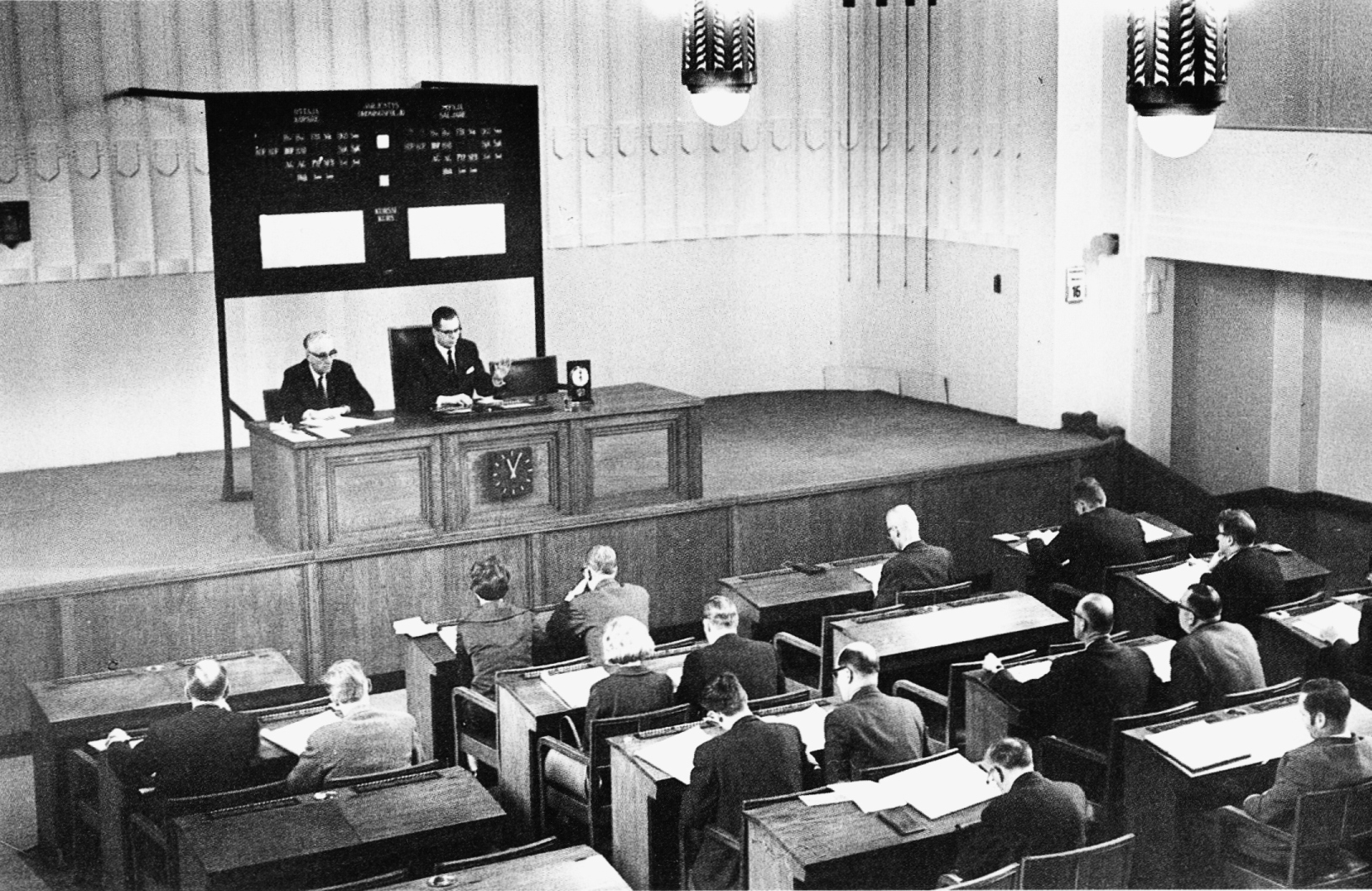
Interior hall of the Helsinki Stock Exchange in Helsinki, Finland, 1965

In the nineteenth century, the industrial revolution enabled rapid development of stock markets, driven by the significant capital requirements for the finance industry and transport. Since the computer revolution of the 1970s, there has been a dematerialization of securities traded on the stock exchange.

In 1971, Nasdaq became the world's first electronic stock market. In France, the dematerialization was effective from 5 November 1984.

The development of information technology during the late part of the 20th century led to a new type of electronic exchange that replaced the more traditional physical markets. This led to new definitions in financial regulations that recognized these new exchanges, such as the multilateral trading facility in Europe and alternative trading system in the United States. Regulators also started using the term trading venue to describe the wider definition which encompasses both traditional exchanges and electronic exchanges.

== Description ==
Exchanges bring together brokers and dealers who buy and sell these objects. These various financial instruments can typically be sold either through the exchange, typically with the benefit of a clearing house to reduce settlement risk.

Exchanges can be subdivided:

- By objects sold:
  - Stock exchange or securities exchange
  - Commodities exchange
  - Foreign exchange market – is rare today in the form of a specialized institution
- By type of trade:
  - Classical exchange – for spot trades
  - Futures exchange or futures and options exchange – for derivatives

In practice, futures exchanges are usually commodity exchanges, i.e., all derivatives, including financial derivatives, are usually traded at commodity exchanges. This has historical reasons: the first exchanges were stock exchanges. In the 19th century, exchanges were opened to trade forward contracts on commodities. Exchange-traded forward contracts are called futures contracts. These "commodity exchanges" later started offering future contracts on other products, such as interest rates and shares, as well as options contracts; now they are generally known as futures exchanges.

For details, see:

- Stock exchange (securities exchange), List of stock exchanges, Category:Stock exchanges
- Commodity exchange (futures exchange), List of futures exchanges, Category:Futures exchanges
- Foreign exchange market

== See also ==
- Commodity market
- Private electronic market
- Stock market
- List of stock exchanges
- Over-the-counter (finance)

== Notes and citations ==
Notes

Citations
