= Market impact =

Concept in economics

In financial markets, market impact is the effect that a market participant has when it buys or sells an asset. It is the extent to which the buying or selling moves the price against the buyer or seller, i.e., upward when buying and downward when selling. It is closely related to market liquidity; in many cases the terms are synonymous.

Market impact is a key consideration before any decision to move money within or between financial markets, especially for large investors e.g. financial institutions. If the amount of money being moved is large (relative to the turnover of the asset(s) in question), then the market impact can be several percentage points and needs to be assessed alongside other transaction costs (costs of buying and selling).

Market impact can arise because the price needs to move to tempt other investors to buy or sell assets (as counterparties), but also because professional investors may position themselves to profit from knowledge that a large investor (or group of investors) is active one way or the other. Some financial intermediaries have such low transaction costs that they can profit from price movements that are too small to be of relevance to the majority of investors.

The financial institution that is seeking to manage its market impact needs to limit the pace of its activity (e.g., keeping its activity below one-third of daily turnover) so as to avoid disrupting the price.

== Market impact cost ==
Market impact cost is a measure of market liquidity that reflects the cost faced by a trader of an index or security. The market impact cost is measured in the chosen numeraire of the market, and is how much additionally a trader must pay over the initial price due to market slippage, i.e. the cost incurred because the transaction itself changed the price of the asset. Market impact costs are a type of transaction costs.

== Measuring market impact ==
Several statistical measures exist. One of the most common is Kyle's Lambda, estimated as the coefficient $\lambda$ from regressing price changes $P_t$ on trade size $y_t$ over some time window.

$$\mathrm{P}_t = \mu + \lambda\mathrm{y}_t$$

For very short periods, this reduces to simply

$$\lambda = \frac{\Delta \mathrm{Price}_t}{\mathrm{OrderFlow}_t}$$

Order flow is typically measured as the total number of shares traded. Under this measure, a highly liquid stock is one that experiences a small price change for a given level of orders.

Kyle's lambda is named from Albert Kyle's famous paper on market microstructure.

Practitioners sometimes model market impact as proportional to the square root of traded volume, an approach that is supported by research. Alternatively, some evidence suggests a logarithmic relationship.

== Unique challenges for microcap traders ==
Microcap (and nanocap) stocks are characterized by a market cap under $300mn ($50mn) relatively limited public float and small daily volume. As a result, these stocks are extremely volatile and susceptible to large price swings.

Microcap and nanocap traders often trade in and out of positions with large blocks of shares to make quick money on speculative events. Microcap and nanocap stocks often have low liquidity because these stocks have a small number of shares and low trading volume, it can be difficult to complete large buy or sell orders. In many instances orders only get partially filled.

== Example ==
Suppose an institutional investor places a limit order to sell 1 million shares of stock XYZ at $10.00 per share. A professional investor may see this limit order being placed, and place an order of their own to short sell 1 million shares of XYZ at $9.99 per share.

- Stock XYZ rises in price to $9.99 and keeps going up past $10.00. The professional investor sells at $9.99 and covers his short position by buying from the institutional investor. His loss is limited to $0.01 per share.
- Stock XYZ rises in price to $9.99 and then comes back down. The professional investor sells at $9.99 and covers his short position when the stock declines. The professional investor can gain $.10 or more per share with very little risk. The institutional investor is unhappy, because he saw the market price rise to $9.99 and come back down, without his order getting filled.

Effectively, the institutional investor's large order has given an option to the professional investor. Institutional investors don't like this, because either the stock price rises to $9.99 and comes back down, without them having the opportunity to sell, or the stock price rises to $10.00 and keeps going up, meaning the institutional investor could have sold at a higher price.

== See also ==
- Slippage (finance)
- Insider Trading
