= Financial innovation =

Creation of new financial instruments, technologies, and institutions

Financial innovation is the act of creating new financial instruments as well as new financial technologies, institutions, and markets. Recent financial innovations include hedge funds, private equity, weather derivatives, retail-structured products, exchange-traded funds, multi-family offices, and Islamic bonds (Sukuk). The shadow banking system has spawned an array of financial innovations including mortgage-backed securities products and collateralized debt obligations (CDOs).

There are three categories of innovation: institutional, product, and process. Institutional innovations relate to the creation of new types of financial firms such as specialist credit card firms, investment consulting firms and related services, and direct banks. Product innovation relates to new products such as derivatives, securitization, and foreign currency mortgages. Process innovations relate to new ways of doing financial business, including online banking and telephone banking.

== Background ==
Financial innovations emerge as a result of a complex interaction between and among household savings and borrowing needs, firm financing needs, the need to identify and manage risks, advances in financial theory and information technology, financial sector profit motives, and, finally, macroeconomic and regulatory factors. Furthermore, distinct financial innovations may arise in different ways depending on whether they are products, platforms, or processes. Several explanations for the emergence of financial innovation have been presented.

Economic theory has much to say about what types of securities should exist, and why some may not exist (why some markets should be "incomplete") but little to say about why new types of securities should come into existence.

One interpretation of the Modigliani–Miller theorem is that taxes and regulation are the only reasons for investors to care what kinds of securities firms issue, whether debt, equity, or something else. The theorem states that the structure of a firm's liabilities should have no bearing on its net worth (absent taxes). The securities may trade at different prices depending on their composition, but they must ultimately add up to the same value.

The traditional account of the determinants of financial innovation in economics is the rationalist approach, which is found in Proposition I of the Modigliani and Miller (M&M) irrelevance theory. According to Proposition I, a company's worth is determined by its potential to generate profits and the risk of its underlying assets. The M&M theory remains true only when substantial assumptions about market flaws are made. These imperfections include information asymmetries, adverse selection and agency problems, incomplete markets, regulation and taxes, and other frictions that limit market participants' ability to maximize utility and would necessitate financial innovations to reduce.

Parallel to the M&M theorem go the works of Markowitz on risk modeling, Eugene Fama on efficient financial markets, William F. Sharpe on quantifying the value of an asset, and Black, Scholes, and Merton on the value of risk laid the path for financial innovations to arise. Yet, the M&M concept has a fundamental problem. The dominant perspective in M&M theory is demand-driven, which overlooks that financial innovations might represent a technological push, meaning they can originate irrespective of market demand reasons. For a long period, the push-pull argument dominated technical thought. Industrial technologists have determined that both elements (push and pull) are relevant. Following this conclusion, the emphasis has shifted to comprehending the confluence of economic, political, institutional, and technological elements, underpinning innovations.

Furthermore, there should be little demand for specific types of securities. The capital asset pricing model, first developed by Jack L. Treynor and William Sharpe, suggests that investors should fully diversify and their portfolios should be a mixture of the "market" and a risk-free investment. Investors with different risk/return goals can use leverage to increase the ratio of the market return to the risk-free return in their portfolios. However, Richard Roll argued that this model was incorrect, because investors cannot invest in the entire market. This implies there should be demand for instruments that open up new types of investment opportunities (since this gets investors closer to being able to buy the entire market), but not for instruments that merely repackage existing risks (since investors already have as much exposure to those risks in their portfolio).

If the world existed as the Arrow–Debreu model posits, then there would be no need for financial innovation. The model assumes that investors are able to purchase securities that pay off if and only if a certain state of the world occurs. Investors can then combine these securities to create portfolios that have whatever payoff they desire. The fundamental theorem of finance states that the price of assembling such a portfolio will be equal to its expected value under the appropriate risk-neutral measure.

== Academic literature ==
Tufano (2003) and Duffie and Rahi (1995) provide useful reviews of the literature.

The extensive literature on principal–agent problems, adverse selection, and information asymmetry points to why investors might prefer some types of securities, such as debt, over others like equity. Myers and Majluf (1984) develop an adverse selection model of equity issuance, in which firms (which are trying to maximize profits for existing shareholders) issue equity only if they are desperate. This was an early article in the pecking order literature, which states that firms prefer to finance investments out of retained earnings first, then debt, and finally equity, because investors are reluctant to trust any firm that needs to issue equity.

Duffie and Rahi also devote a considerable section to examining the utility and efficiency implications of financial innovation. This is also the topic of many of the papers in the special edition of the Journal of Economic Theory in which theirs is the lead article. The usefulness of spanning the market appears to be limited (or, equivalently, the disutility of incomplete markets is not great).

Allen and Gale (1988) is one of the first papers to endogenize security issuance contingent on financial regulation—specifically, bans on short sales. In these circumstances, they find that the traditional split of cash flows between debt and equity is not optimal, and that state-contingent securities are preferred. Ross (1989) develops a model in which new financial products must overcome marketing and distribution costs. Persons and Warther (1997) studied booms and busts associated with financial innovation.

The fixed costs of creating liquid markets for new financial instruments appears to be considerable. Black and Scholes (1974) describe some of the difficulties they encountered when trying to market the forerunners to modern index funds. These included regulatory problems, marketing costs, taxes, and fixed costs of management, personnel, and trading. Shiller (2008) describes some of the frustrations involved with creating a market for house price futures.

== Examples ==
=== Spanning the market ===
Some types of financial instrument became prominent after macroeconomic conditions forced investors to be more aware of the need to hedge certain types of risk.

- Interest rate swaps were developed in the early 1980s after interest rates skyrocketed
- Credit default swaps were developed in the early 2000s after the recession beginning in 2001 led to the highest corporate-bond default rate in 2002 since the Great Depression

=== Mathematical innovation ===
- Options markets experienced explosive growth after the Black–Scholes model was developed in 1973
- Collateralized debt obligations (CDOs) were heavily influenced by the popularization of the copula technique However, they also played a role in the 2008 financial crisis.
- Flash trading came into existence in 2000 at the Chicago Board Options Exchange and 2006 in the stock market. In July 2010, Direct Edge became a U.S. Futures Exchange. Nasdaq and Bats Exchange, Inc created their own flash markets in early 2009.

Futures, options, and many other types of derivatives have been around for centuries: the Japanese rice futures market started trading around 1730. However, recent decades have seen an explosion use of derivatives and mathematically complicated securitization techniques. From a sociological point of view, some economists argue that mathematical formulas actually change the way that economic agents use and price assets. Economists, rather than acting as a camera taking an objective picture of the way the world works, actively change behavior by providing formulas that let dispersed agents agree on prices for new assets. See Exotic derivative, Exotic option.

=== Avoiding taxes and regulation ===
Miller (1986) placed great emphasis on the role of taxes and government regulation in stimulating financial innovation. The Modigliani–Miller theorem explicitly considered taxes as a reason to prefer one type of security over another, despite that corporations and investors should be indifferent to capital structure in a fractionless world.

The development of checking accounts at U.S. banks was in order to avoid punitive taxes on state bank notes that were part of the National Banking Act.

Some investors use total return swaps to convert dividends into capital gains, which are taxed at a lower rate.

Many times, regulators have explicitly discouraged or outlawed trading in certain types of financial securities. In the United States, gambling is mostly illegal, and it can be difficult to tell whether financial contracts are illegal gambling instruments or legitimate tools for investment and risk-sharing. The Commodity Futures Trading Commission (CFTC) is in charge of making this determination. The difficulty that the Chicago Board of Trade faced in attempting to trade futures on stocks and stock indexes is described in Melamed (1996).

In the United States, Regulation Q drove several types of financial innovation to get around its interest rate ceilings, including eurodollars and NOW accounts.

== Role of technology ==
Some types of financial innovation are driven by improvements in computer and telecommunication technology. For example, Paul Volcker suggested that for most people, the creation of the ATM was a greater financial innovation than asset-backed securitization. Other types of financial innovation affecting the payments system include credit and debit cards and online payment systems like PayPal.

These types of innovations are notable because they reduce transaction costs. Households need to keep lower cash balances—if the economy exhibits cash-in-advance constraints then these kinds of financial innovations can contribute to greater efficiency. One study of Italian households' use of debit cards found that ownership of an ATM card resulted in benefits worth €17 annually.

These types of innovations may also affect monetary policy by reducing real household balances. Especially with the increased popularity of online banking, households are able to keep greater percentages of their wealth in non-cash instruments. In a special edition of International Finance devoted to the interaction of e-commerce and central banking, Goodhart (2000) and Woodford (2000) express confidence in the ability of a central bank to maintain its policy goals by affecting the short-term interest rate even if electronic money has eliminated the demand for central bank liabilities, while Friedman (2000) is less sanguine.

A 2016 PwC report pointed to the "accelerating pace of technological change" as the "most creative force—and also the most destructive—in the financial services ecosystem".

The advancement of technology has enabled a segment of underserved clients to access more complex investing alternatives, such as social trading tools and platforms, and retail algorithmic trading. The first ones help inexperienced investors gain expertise and knowledge, for example, by copy trading, which allows them to imitate top-performing traders' portfolios (e.g., eToro, Estimize, Stocktwits). The second option allows investors with minimum technical skills to build, backtest, and implement trading algorithms, which they may then share with others (Streak, Quantopian & Zipline, Numerai). These solutions, mostly provided by FinTechs, provide simple and fast ways to optimize returns. They are also less expensive than traditional investment management since, unlike traditional investment management, most social trading platforms do not demand a minimum investment to get started.

In developed markets, the amount of algorithm trading is now approximately 70-80%. Advances in computer computing power, data collecting, and telecommunications all contributed to the creation of algorithmic trading.

== Consequences ==
Financial innovations may influence economic or financial systems. For instance, financial innovation may affect monetary policy effectiveness and the ability of central banks to stabilize the economy. The relationship between money and interest rates, which can define monetary policy effectiveness, is affected by financial innovation. Financial innovation also influences firm profitability, transactions, and social welfare.

According to the traditional innovation-growth theory, financial innovations assist in increasing the quality and diversity of banking services, allow risk sharing, complete the market, and, ultimately, improve allocative efficiency. Thus, concentrating on the positive aspects of financial innovation.

The innovation fragility perspective, on the other hand, focuses on the "dark" side of innovation. It specifically identified financial innovations as the root cause of the 2008 financial crisis, leading to unprecedented credit expansion that fueled the boom and subsequent bust in housing prices, engineering securities perceived to be safe but exposed to overlooked risks, and assisting banks in developing structured products to capitalize on investors' misunderstandings of financial markets.

There is no definitive evidence of whether financial innovation benefits or damages the financial industry. Nevertheless, there is compelling evidence that financial innovation is linked to higher levels of economic growth. Similarly, there is evidence that financial innovation promotes bank expansion and financial depth.

== Criticism ==
Some economists argue that financial innovation has little to no productivity benefit: Paul Volcker stated that "there is little correlation between sophistication of a banking system and productivity growth", that there is no "neutral evidence that financial innovation has led to economic growth", and that financial innovation was a cause of the 2008 financial crisis, while Paul Krugman states that "the rapid growth in finance since 1980 has largely been a matter of rent-seeking, rather than true productivity". Jonathan Adair Turner, the former chair of the British Financial Services Authority, has made similar claims.

== See also ==
- Financial technology

== Bibliography ==
- Allen, Franklin; Douglas Gale (1988). "Optimal Security Design". The Review of Financial Studies. 1 (3): 229–263. doi:10.1093/rfs/1.3.229.
- Duffie, Darrell; Rohit Rahi (1995). "Financial Market Innovation and Security Design: An Introduction". Journal of Economic Theory. 65 (1): 1–42. doi:10.1006/jeth.1995.1001.
- Melamed, Leo (1996). Leo Melamed: Escape to the Futures (First ed.). Wiley. ISBN 978-0-471-11215-0.
- Myers, Stewart C.; Majluf, Nicholas S. (1984). "Corporate financing and investment decisions when firms have information that investors do not have". Journal of Financial Economics. 13 (2): 187–221. doi:10.1016/0304-405X(84)90023-0. hdl:1721.1/2068.
- Shiller, Robert J. (2008). Derivatives Markets for Home Prices (PDF) (Discussion Paper). Cowles Foundation. CFDP 1648.
- Persons, John C.; Warther, Vincent A. (1997). "Boom and Bust Patterns in the Adoption of Financial Innovations". The Review of Financial Studies. 10 (4): 939–967. doi:10.1093/rfs/10.4.939.
- Ross, Stephen A. (1989). "Institutional Markets, Financial Marketing, and Financial Innovation". The Journal of Finance. 44 (3): 541–556. doi:10.2307/2328769. JSTOR 2328769.
- Tufano, Peter (2003). "Chapter 6 Financial innovation". The Handbook of the Economics of Finance. Vol. 1A. Elsevier. pp. 307–335. ISBN 978-0-0804-9507-1.
