= Island ECN =

Electronic stock trading network

Island ECN was one of the first electronic communication networks (ECNs) established for the trading equities in the United States. Founded in 1996 by Datek Securities veterans Jeff Citron and Joshua Levine, Island executed its first trades in 1997.

== History ==
Prior to Island, Citron and Levine worked together at Datek Securities (now TD Ameritrade). Citron's background was in trading and Levine had experience with software development. While at Datek, they worked together to develop a software program called Watcher. Watcher was one of the first programs to provide real-time quote and electronic order capabilities for trading Nasdaq stocks through the Small Order Execution System (SOES). In 1995, Watcher was augmented with a system called "Jump Trades" that let users of Watcher skip the Nasdaq intermediary and trade directly with each other.

On February 9, 1996, Levine announced the launch of Island. Unlike the existing Instinet system, which still used human traders to match buy and sell orders, matching on Island was fully automated using an automated order matching system. Island published an electronic feed called "ITCH" of all trades in the system, and used a protocol called "OUCH" to place orders. The data feed was accessible for free, an innovation over the tightly controlled data for traditional exchanges, and trading fees were significantly lower than on Nasdaq.

One of its first customers was South Carolina-based Automated Trading Desk, an early algorithmic trading firm. Island grew quickly, accounting for almost half of all trades on Nasdaq's SelectNet system by late 1996, and handling $22.1 billion of transactions between July and September of that year. By 1998, it had become the second-largest ECN, after Instinet, with 20% of the market.

In October 1999, Citron was forced out at the behest of president Ed Nicoll, who was worried that Citron's connections to Datek—then under investigation by the Justice Department—could cause the firm legal issues. In December 2000, Island became a separate company from Datek, with Matt Andresen as CEO. Island was an early hub for high-frequency trading firms like Getco and Tradebot in the early 2000s.

Instinet acquired Island Exchange in 2002 and renamed the trading platform to Inet.

== See also ==
- Electronic communication network
- Electronic trading platform
- Instinet
- Order matching system
