= FXall =

Foreign exchange aggregator

FX Alliance Inc
- Company type: Subsidiary
- Industry: FX market, Money market
- Founded: 2000
- Headquarters: New York, NY, US
- Area served: Worldwide
- Services: Electronic communication network, Algorithmic trading, Straight Through Processing
- Owner: Refinitiv
- Website: www.fxall.com

FXall (FX Alliance Inc) is a foreign exchange aggregator providing electronic trading to banks and brokers using an electronic communication network with headquarters in New York. The company provides electronic trading in the foreign exchange market to institutional clients using straight through processing. Clients include active traders, asset managers, corporate treasurers, market makers, broker-dealers and prime brokers. The company has been a subsidiary of Refinitiv since 2018.

== History ==
FXall began operations in 2000 as a dealing platform for a consortium of 16 banking institutions, each owning between three and five percent of the company. By 2003 it had grown to having trading volume of $9bn overtaking its main rivals.

== Acquisition ==
In 2012 the company was acquired by Thomson Reuters for $625 million.

After Thomson Reuters sold a majority stake in its Financial & Risk (F&R) unit to private equity firm Blackstone Inc. in 2018, the new business, now called Refinitiv, became the owner of FXall.

== See also ==
- CitiFX Pro
- ChangeGroup
