= Brielle (disambiguation) =

Brielle may refer to:

- Brielle, a town in the Netherlands
  - Capture of Brielle, the siege of the town in the Eighty Years' War
- Brielle, New Jersey, a borough in New Jersey
  - Brielle School District, a school district
  - Brielle Circle, a traffic circle
  - Brielle Draw, a railroad bascule bridge over the Manasquan River
- Brielle (given name), a feminine name

== See also ==
- Brielles, a commune in Brittany, France
