= Brielle, New Jersey =

Borough in Monmouth County, New Jersey, US

- Borough
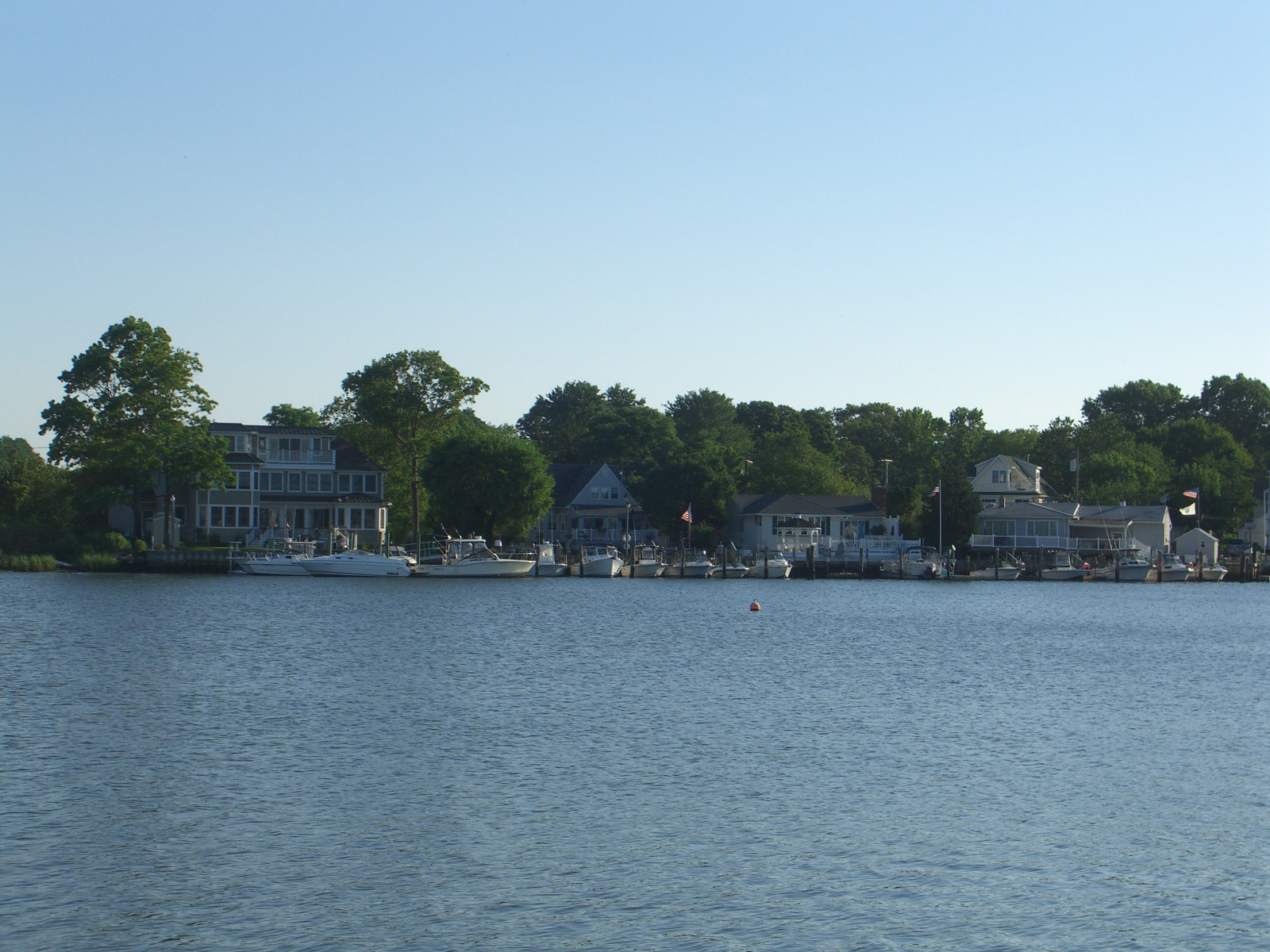
- Glimmer Glass Beach in Brielle

- coat of arms
- Motto: "A Community By the River"
- Location of Brielle in Monmouth County highlighted in red (left). Inset map: Location of Monmouth County in New Jersey highlighted in orange (right).

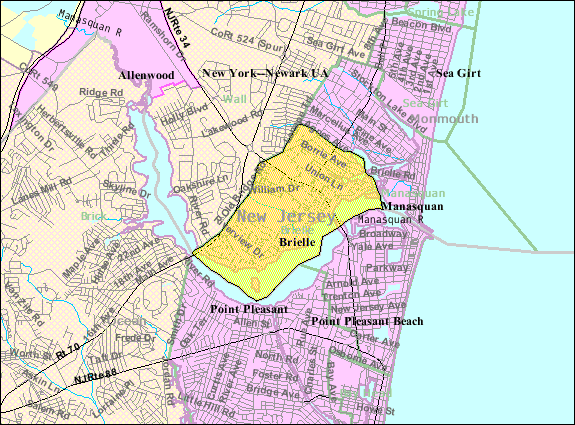
- Census Bureau map of Brielle, New Jersey

- Location in Monmouth County Location in New Jersey Location in the United States
- Coordinates: 40.105478°N 74.063676°W
- Country: United States
- State: New Jersey
- County: Monmouth
- Incorporated: June 3, 1919
- Named for: Brielle, Netherlands

Government
  - Type: Borough
  - Body: Borough Council
  - Mayor: Frank A. Garruzzo (R, term ends December 31, 2027)
  - Administrator: Thomas F. Nolan
  - Municipal clerk: Carol Baran

Area
  - Total: 2.37 sq mi (6.14 km^{2})
  - Land: 1.76 sq mi (4.55 km^{2})
  - Water: 0.61 sq mi (1.59 km^{2}) 25.86%
  - Rank: 383rd of 565 in state 26th of 53 in county
- Elevation: 7 ft (2.1 m)

Population (2020)
  - Total: 4,982
  - Estimate (2023): 4,920
  - Rank: 374th of 565 in state 32nd of 53 in county
  - Density: 2,837.9/sq mi (1,095.7/km^{2})
  - Rank: 229th of 565 in state 28th of 53 in county
- Time zone: UTC−05:00 (Eastern (EST))
  - Summer (DST): UTC−04:00 (Eastern (EDT))
- ZIP Code: 08730
- Area code: 732 exchanges: 223, 292, 528
- FIPS code: 3402507750
- GNIS feature ID: 0885170
- Website: www.briellenj.gov

Brielle is a borough located in southern Monmouth County, in the U.S. state of New Jersey, along the Manasquan River. As of the 2020 United States census, the borough's population was 4,982, its highest decennial count ever and an increase of 208 (+4.4%) from the 2010 census count of 4,774, which in turn reflected a decline of 119 (−2.4%) from the 4,893 counted in the 2000 census.

Brielle was formed as a borough by an act of the New Jersey Legislature on April 10, 1919, from portions of Wall Township, based on the results of a referendum passed on June 3, 1919. The borough was named after Brielle, Netherlands.

== History ==
Archaeological excavations along what is now Birch Drive reveal temporary Lenape Native American settlements. The Lenape practiced farming in other parts of Monmouth County much of the year, and they visited the wooded areas in what is now Brielle for hunting and fishing.

The area was originally part of Shrewsbury Township and the first settlers were primarily farmers, and the area became known as Union Landing. In colonial times, salt was an important preservative, and before the American Revolutionary War, most of it was imported from Great Britain. The Union Salt Works opened around the outbreak of the war, and on April 5, 1778, several British Loyalists attacked and burned the salt works and other buildings. A year later, the salt works reopened and continued to operate through the duration of the war.

Early in the 19th century, Shrewsbury Township was divided, and the area became part of Howell Township which was further divided in 1851, when the area became part of Wall Township. On July 7, 1881, a group of businessmen purchased several acres of land and formed the Brielle Land Association with the intention of building vacation homes. The quaint riverside charm of the area reminded one of the developers of another pastoral town on a river which he had visited, Brielle, in the Netherlands.

Author Robert Louis Stevenson vacationed in Brielle for most of May 1888. During his stay he wrote a portion of his book The Master of Ballantrae and gave Osborn Island the nickname "Treasure Island" which was the title of one of his previous books.

== Geography ==
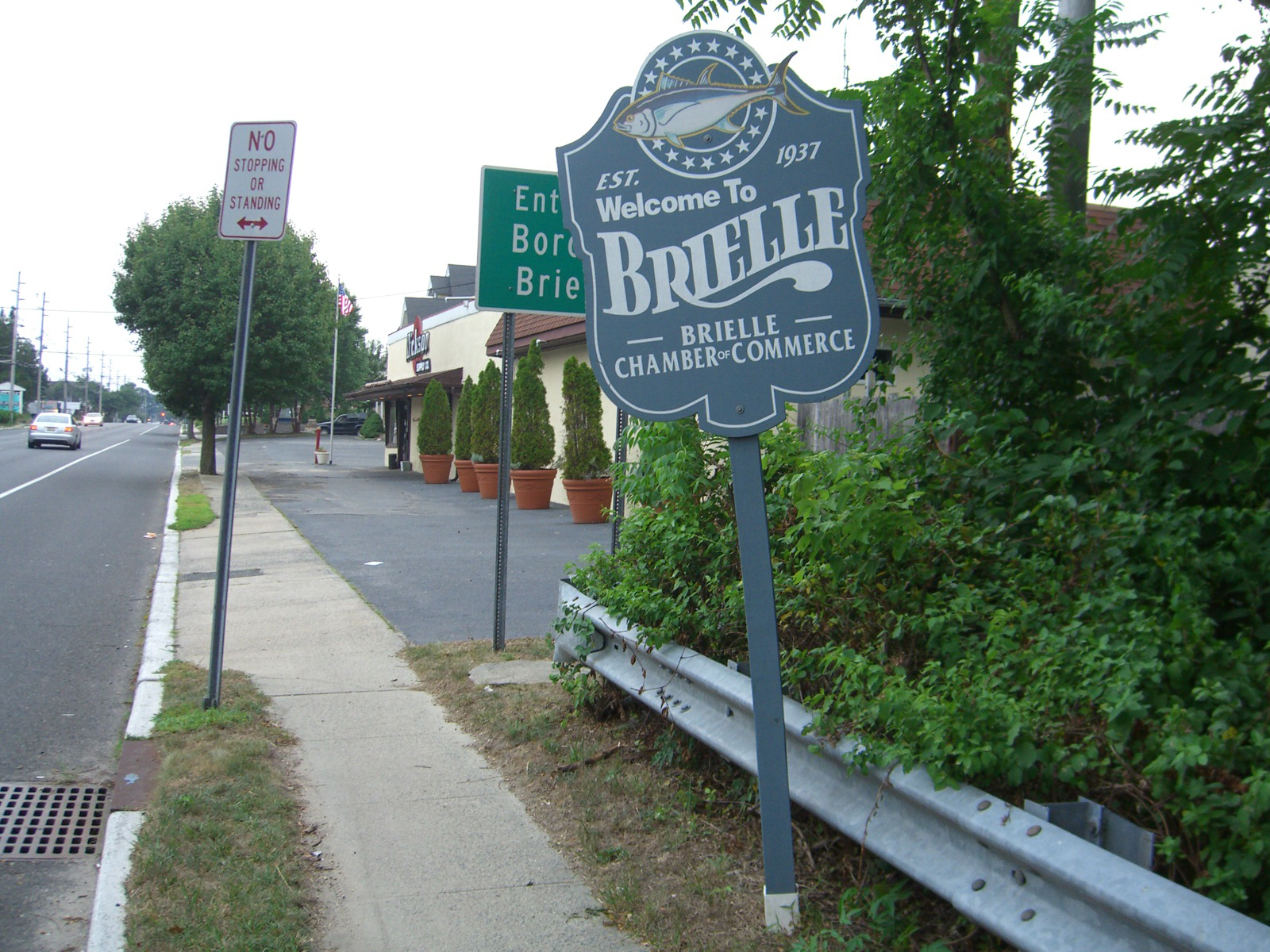
Brielle welcome sign at the border with Manasquan on Union Avenue

According to the United States Census Bureau, the borough had a total area of 2.37 square miles (6.14 km^{2}), including 1.76 square miles (4.55 km^{2}) of land and 0.61 square miles (1.59 km^{2}) of water (25.86%).

Located at the southeastern corner of Monmouth County, Brielle is bordered to the north and east by the Manasquan, to the west by Brick Township (in Ocean County) and Wall Township and to the south by Point Pleasant and Point Pleasant Beach across the Manasquan River. Route 35 runs through the middle of the town and Route 70 runs along its western edge.

The borough is primarily a residential community of single homes, with a few condominiums; there are almost no undeveloped lots of land left. There are several businesses located along Union Avenue and Higgins Avenue and some marinas along the Manasquan River. Ripley's Believe It or Not! once stated that Brielle has "16 bars and no churches". It currently has one church, The Church in Brielle (formerly the Dutch Reformed Church) and several restaurants that have liquor licenses, but no full bars. There is also a 140 acres (0.57 km^{2}) 18 hole golf course called the Manasquan River Golf Club.

The town has approximately 6.4 kilometers (4.0 mi) of waterfront along the Manasquan River, Glimmerglass, and Debbie's Creek, all of which are salt water and tidal. Brielle's borders extend to an 8-acre (32,000 m^{2}) island in the Manasquan River.

Manasquan Park is an unincorporated community located within Brielle.

== Demographics ==
Historical population
| Census | Pop. | Note | %± |
|---|---|---|---|
| 1920 | 392 | | — |
| 1930 | 684 | | 74.5% |
| 1940 | 961 | | 40.5% |
| 1950 | 1,328 | | 38.2% |
| 1960 | 2,619 | | 97.2% |
| 1970 | 3,594 | | 37.2% |
| 1980 | 4,068 | | 13.2% |
| 1990 | 4,406 | | 8.3% |
| 2000 | 4,893 | | 11.1% |
| 2010 | 4,774 | | −2.4% |
| 2020 | 4,982 | | 4.4% |
| 2023 (est.) | 4,920 | ▼ | −1.2% |
Population sources: 1920; 1920–1930 1940–2000; 2000 2010 2020

=== 2020 census ===
As of the 2020 census, Brielle had a population of 4,982. The median age was 48.9 years. 19.8% of residents were under the age of 18 and 22.1% of residents were 65 years of age or older. For every 100 females there were 94.8 males, and for every 100 females age 18 and older there were 93.5 males age 18 and over.

100.0% of residents lived in urban areas, while 0.0% lived in rural areas.

There were 1,949 households in Brielle, of which 27.9% had children under the age of 18 living in them. Of all households, 60.4% were married-couple households, 12.2% were households with a male householder and no spouse or partner present, and 23.8% were households with a female householder and no spouse or partner present. About 23.9% of all households were made up of individuals and 13.6% had someone living alone who was 65 years of age or older.

There were 2,176 housing units, of which 10.4% were vacant. The homeowner vacancy rate was 1.1% and the rental vacancy rate was 4.7%.

Racial composition as of the 2020 census
| Race | Number | Percent |
|---|---|---|
| White | 4,550 | 91.3% |
| Black or African American | 73 | 1.5% |
| American Indian and Alaska Native | 6 | 0.1% |
| Asian | 34 | 0.7% |
| Native Hawaiian and Other Pacific Islander | 2 | 0.0% |
| Some other race | 82 | 1.6% |
| Two or more races | 235 | 4.7% |
| Hispanic or Latino (of any race) | 226 | 4.5% |

=== 2010 census ===
The 2010 United States census counted 4,774 people, 1,805 households, and 1,336 families in the borough. The population density was 2,717.5 per square mile (1,049.2/km^{2}). There were 2,034 housing units at an average density of 1,157.8 per square mile (447.0/km^{2}). The racial makeup was 94.64% (4,518) White, 2.53% (121) Black or African American, 0.10% (5) Native American, 0.94% (45) Asian, 0.00% (0) Pacific Islander, 0.46% (22) from other races, and 1.32% (63) from two or more races. Hispanic or Latino of any race were 3.18% (152) of the population.

Of the 1,805 households, 33.4% had children under the age of 18; 60.4% were married couples living together; 10.3% had a female householder with no husband present and 26.0% were non-families. Of all households, 22.0% were made up of individuals and 9.9% had someone living alone who was 65 years of age or older. The average household size was 2.64 and the average family size was 3.13.

26.1% of the population were under the age of 18, 5.4% from 18 to 24, 18.7% from 25 to 44, 32.8% from 45 to 64, and 16.9% who were 65 years of age or older. The median age was 44.9 years. For every 100 females, the population had 97.3 males. For every 100 females ages 18 and older there were 91.3 males.

The Census Bureau's 2006–2010 American Community Survey showed that (in 2010 inflation-adjusted dollars) median household income was $98,419 (with a margin of error of +/− $10,635) and the median family income was $108,818 (+/− $11,831). Males had a median income of $84,568 (+/− $8,259) versus $53,041 (+/− $4,411) for females. The per capita income for the borough was $45,445 (+/− $5,694). About none of families and 3.7% of the population were below the poverty line, including none of those under age 18 and 2.9% of those age 65 or over.

=== 2000 census ===
As of the 2000 United States census there were 4,893 people, 1,938 households, and 1,414 families residing in the borough. The population density was 2,754.4 inhabitants per square mile (1,063.5/km^{2}). There were 2,123 housing units at an average density of 1,195.1 per square mile (461.4/km^{2}). The racial makeup of the borough was 93.05% White, 3.52% African American, 0.06% Native American, 0.67% Asian, 1.61% from other races, and 1.08% from two or more races. Hispanic or Latino of any race were 3.31% of the population.

There were 1,938 households, out of which 30.8% had children under the age of 18 living with them, 62.0% were married couples living together, 7.6% had a female householder with no husband present, and 27.0% were non-families. 23.5% of all households were made up of individuals, and 12.0% had someone living alone who was 65 years of age or older. The average household size was 2.52 and the average family size was 3.00.

In the borough the population was spread out, with 23.7% under the age of 18, 4.8% from 18 to 24, 24.8% from 25 to 44, 29.0% from 45 to 64, and 17.7% who were 65 years of age or older. The median age was 43 years. For every 100 females, there were 91.4 males. For every 100 females age 18 and over, there were 89.8 males.

The median income for a household in the borough was $178,368, and the median income for a family was $172,867. Males had a median income of $98,828 versus $72,156 for females. The per capita income for the borough was $105,785. About 2.6% of families and 3.9% of the population were below the poverty line, including 1.9% of those under age 18 and 5.4% of those age 65 or over.

== Government ==
=== Local government ===
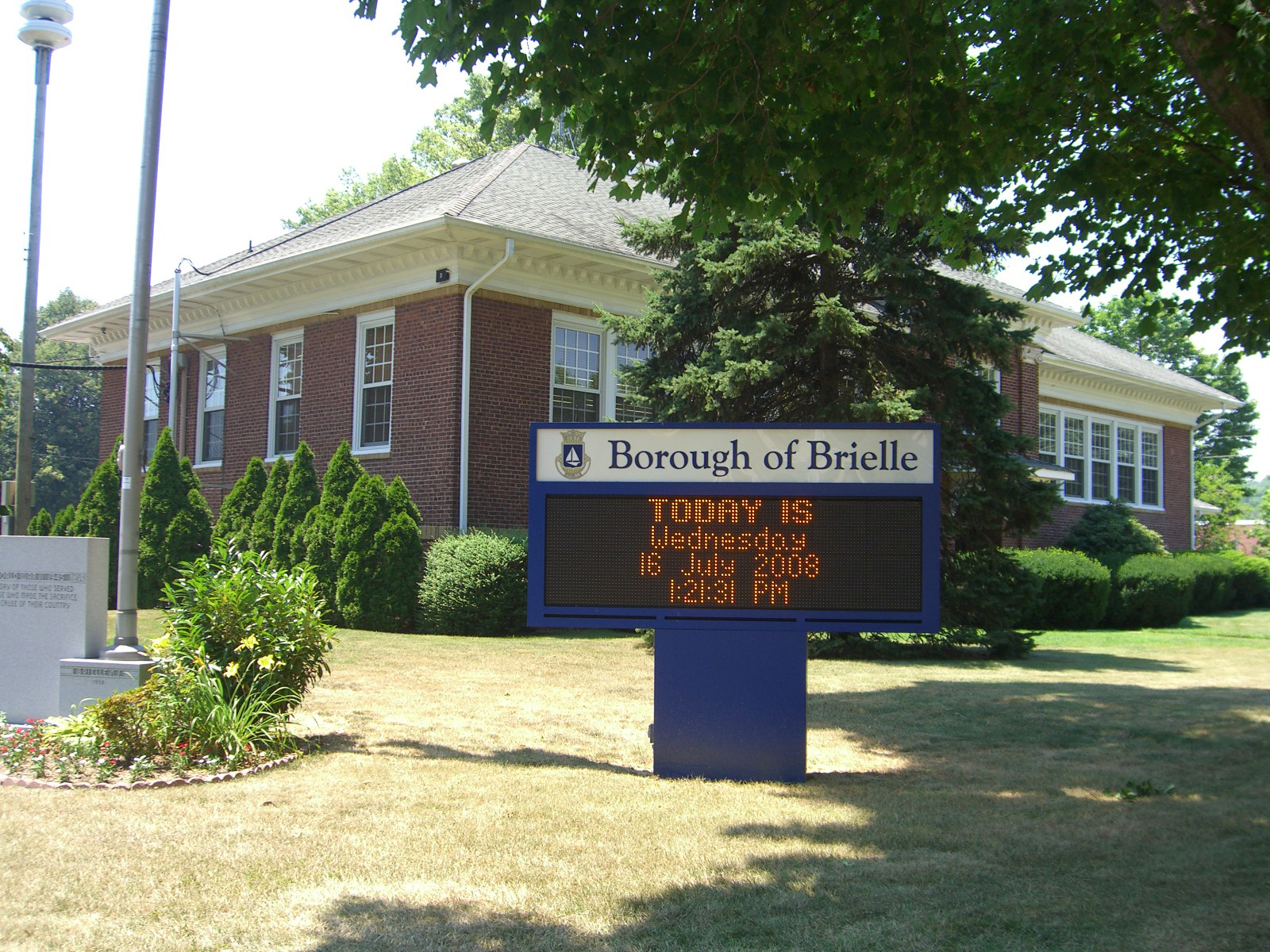
Brielle Borough Hall, at the corner of Union Avenue and Union Lane

Brielle is governed under the borough form of New Jersey municipal government, which is used in 218 (of the 564) municipalities statewide, making it the most common form of government in New Jersey. The governing body is comprised of a mayor and a borough council, with all positions elected at-large on a partisan basis as part of the November general election. A mayor is elected directly by the voters to a four-year term of office. The borough council includes six members elected to serve three-year terms on a staggered basis, with two seats coming up for election each year in a three-year cycle. The borough form of government used by Brielle is a "weak mayor / strong council" government in which council members act as the legislative body with the mayor presiding at meetings and voting only in the event of a tie. The mayor can veto ordinances subject to an override by a two-thirds majority vote of the council. The mayor makes committee and liaison assignments for council members, and most appointments are made by the mayor with the advice and consent of the council.

As of 2025, the mayor of the Borough of Brielle is Republican Frank A. Garruzzo, whose term of office ends December 31, 2027. Members of the Brielle Borough Council are Eliot Colon (R, 2027), Michael A. Gianforte (R, 2025), Cort W. Gorham (R, 2025), Paul K. Nolan (R, 2027), Timothy A. Shaak (R, 2026) and John V. Visceglia (R, 2026).

Eliot Colon was appointed to fill the term expiring in December 2024 that became vacant after Frank A. Garruzzo stepped down to take office as mayor in January 2024.

=== Federal, state, and county representation ===
Brielle is located in the 4th Congressional District and is part of New Jersey's 10th state legislative district.

For the 119th United States Congress, New Jersey's 4th congressional district is represented by Chris Smith (R, Manchester Township). New Jersey is represented in the United States Senate by Democrats Cory Booker (Newark, term ends 2027) and Andy Kim (Moorestown, term ends 2031).

For the 2026–2027 session, the 10th legislative district of the New Jersey Legislature is represented in the State Senate by James W. Holzapfel (R, Toms River) and in the General Assembly by Paul Kanitra (R, Point Pleasant Beach) and Gregory P. McGuckin (R, Toms River).

Monmouth County is governed by a Board of County Commissioners composed of five members who are elected at-large to serve three-year terms of office on a staggered basis, with either one or two seats up for election each year as part of the November general election. At an annual reorganization meeting held in the beginning of January, the board selects one of its members to serve as director and another as deputy director.

As of 2025, Monmouth County's Commissioners are Director Thomas A. Arnone (R, Neptune City, 2025), Susan M. Kiley (R, Hazlet Township, 2027), Erik Anderson (R, Shrewsbury, 2026), Nick DiRocco (R, Wall Township, 2025), and Deputy Director Ross F. Licitra (R, Marlboro Township, 2026).

Constitutional officers elected on a countywide basis are Clerk Christine Giordano Hanlon (R, 2025; Ocean Township), Sheriff Shaun Golden (R, 2025; Howell Township) and Surrogate Rosemarie D. Peters (R, 2026; Middletown Township).

=== Politics ===
Presidential election results

United States presidential election results for Brielle
| Year | Republican | | Democratic | | Third party(ies) | |
| Year | No. | % | No. | % | No. | % |
|---|---|---|---|---|---|---|
| 2024 | 2,167 | 62.43% | 1,263 | 36.39% | 41 | 1.18% |
| 2020 | 2,176 | 60.58% | 1,367 | 38.06% | 49 | 1.36% |
| 2016 | 1,993 | 64.58% | 941 | 30.49% | 152 | 4.93% |
| 2012 | 1,893 | 66.61% | 914 | 32.16% | 35 | 1.23% |
| 2008 | 1,842 | 62.08% | 1,085 | 36.57% | 40 | 1.35% |
| 2004 | 1,971 | 67.92% | 913 | 31.46% | 18 | 0.62% |
| 2000 | 1,707 | 63.50% | 861 | 32.03% | 120 | 4.46% |
| 1996 | 1,290 | 57.82% | 745 | 33.39% | 196 | 8.79% |
| 1992 | 1,358 | 56.05% | 668 | 27.57% | 397 | 16.38% |
| 1988 | 1,633 | 74.87% | 548 | 25.13% | 0 | 0.00% |
| 1984 | 1,702 | 76.98% | 509 | 23.02% | 0 | 0.00% |
| 1980 | 1,423 | 72.20% | 429 | 21.77% | 119 | 6.04% |
| 1976 | 1,368 | 73.19% | 501 | 26.81% | 0 | 0.00% |
| 1972 | 1,414 | 79.26% | 370 | 20.74% | 0 | 0.00% |
| 1968 | 1,229 | 71.50% | 410 | 23.85% | 80 | 4.65% |
| 1964 | 912 | 61.41% | 573 | 38.59% | 0 | 0.00% |
| 1960 | 1,221 | 81.45% | 278 | 18.55% | 0 | 0.00% |
| 1956 | 920 | 89.15% | 112 | 10.85% | 0 | 0.00% |
| 1952 | 665 | 79.74% | 169 | 20.26% | 0 | 0.00% |
| 1948 | 459 | 76.88% | 123 | 20.60% | 15 | 2.51% |
| 1944 | 374 | 71.65% | 148 | 28.35% | 0 | 0.00% |
| 1940 | 374 | 71.79% | 147 | 28.21% | 0 | 0.00% |
| 1936 | 301 | 66.01% | 155 | 33.99% | 0 | 0.00% |
| 1932 | 261 | 67.27% | 127 | 32.73% | 0 | 0.00% |
| 1928 | 269 | 82.52% | 57 | 17.48% | 0 | 0.00% |
| 1924 | 187 | 78.24% | 52 | 21.76% | 0 | 0.00% |
| 1920 | 132 | 67.01% | 65 | 32.99% | 0 | 0.00% |

As of March 2011, there were a total of 3,653 registered voters in Brielle, of which 617 (16.9%) were registered as Democrats, 1,446 (39.6%) were registered as Republicans and 1,590 (43.5%) were registered as Unaffiliated. There were no voters registered to other parties.

Gubernatorial election results for Brielle
| Year | Republican | | Democratic | | Third party(ies) | |
| Year | No. | % | No. | % | No. | % |
|---|---|---|---|---|---|---|
| 2025 | 1,883 | 64.33% | 1,037 | 35.43% | 7 | 0.24% |
| 2021 | 1,748 | 70.00% | 737 | 29.52% | 12 | 0.48% |
| 2017 | 1,352 | 67.60% | 607 | 30.35% | 41 | 2.05% |
| 2013 | 1,533 | 79.06% | 376 | 19.39% | 30 | 1.55% |
| 2009 | 1,571 | 71.28% | 491 | 22.28% | 142 | 6.44% |
| 2005 | 1,453 | 67.33% | 639 | 29.61% | 66 | 3.06% |

In the 2012 presidential election, Republican Mitt Romney received 66.7% of the vote (1,893 cast), ahead of Democrat Barack Obama with 32.2% (914 votes), and other candidates with 1.0% (29 votes), among the 2,859 ballots cast by the borough's 3,830 registered voters (23 ballots were spoiled), for a turnout of 74.6%. In the 2008 presidential election, Republican John McCain received 61.3% of the vote (1,842 cast), ahead of Democrat Barack Obama with 36.1% (1,085 votes) and other candidates with 1.3% (40 votes), among the 3,003 ballots cast by the borough's 3,824 registered voters, for a turnout of 78.5%. In the 2004 presidential election, Republican George W. Bush received 67.5% of the vote (1,971 ballots cast), outpolling Democrat John Kerry with 31.3% (913 votes) and other candidates with 0.5% (18 votes), among the 2,918 ballots cast by the borough's 3,805 registered voters, for a turnout percentage of 76.7.

In the 2013 gubernatorial election, Republican Chris Christie received 79.1% of the vote (1,533 cast), ahead of Democrat Barbara Buono with 19.4% (376 votes), and other candidates with 1.5% (30 votes), among the 1,963 ballots cast by the borough's 3,852 registered voters (24 ballots were spoiled), for a turnout of 51.0%. In the 2009 gubernatorial election, Republican Chris Christie received 70.9% of the vote (1,571 ballots cast), ahead of Democrat Jon Corzine with 22.2% (491 votes), Independent Chris Daggett with 5.8% (129 votes) and other candidates with 0.6% (13 votes), among the 2,215 ballots cast by the borough's 3,664 registered voters, yielding a 60.5% turnout.

United States Senate election results for Brielle1
| Year | Republican | | Democratic | | Third party(ies) | |
| Year | No. | % | No. | % | No. | % |
|---|---|---|---|---|---|---|
| 2024 | 2,117 | 63.08% | 1,194 | 35.58% | 45 | 1.34% |
| 2018 | 1,746 | 67.05% | 744 | 28.57% | 114 | 4.38% |
| 2012 | 1,808 | 67.54% | 819 | 30.59% | 50 | 1.87% |
| 2006 | 1,331 | 68.82% | 557 | 28.80% | 46 | 2.38% |

United States Senate election results for Brielle2
| Year | Republican | | Democratic | | Third party(ies) | |
| Year | No. | % | No. | % | No. | % |
|---|---|---|---|---|---|---|
| 2020 | 2,248 | 63.06% | 1,261 | 35.37% | 56 | 1.57% |
| 2014 | 1,084 | 66.46% | 503 | 30.84% | 44 | 2.70% |
| 2013 | 842 | 68.29% | 380 | 30.82% | 11 | 0.89% |
| 2008 | 1,814 | 66.16% | 886 | 32.31% | 42 | 1.53% |

== Education ==
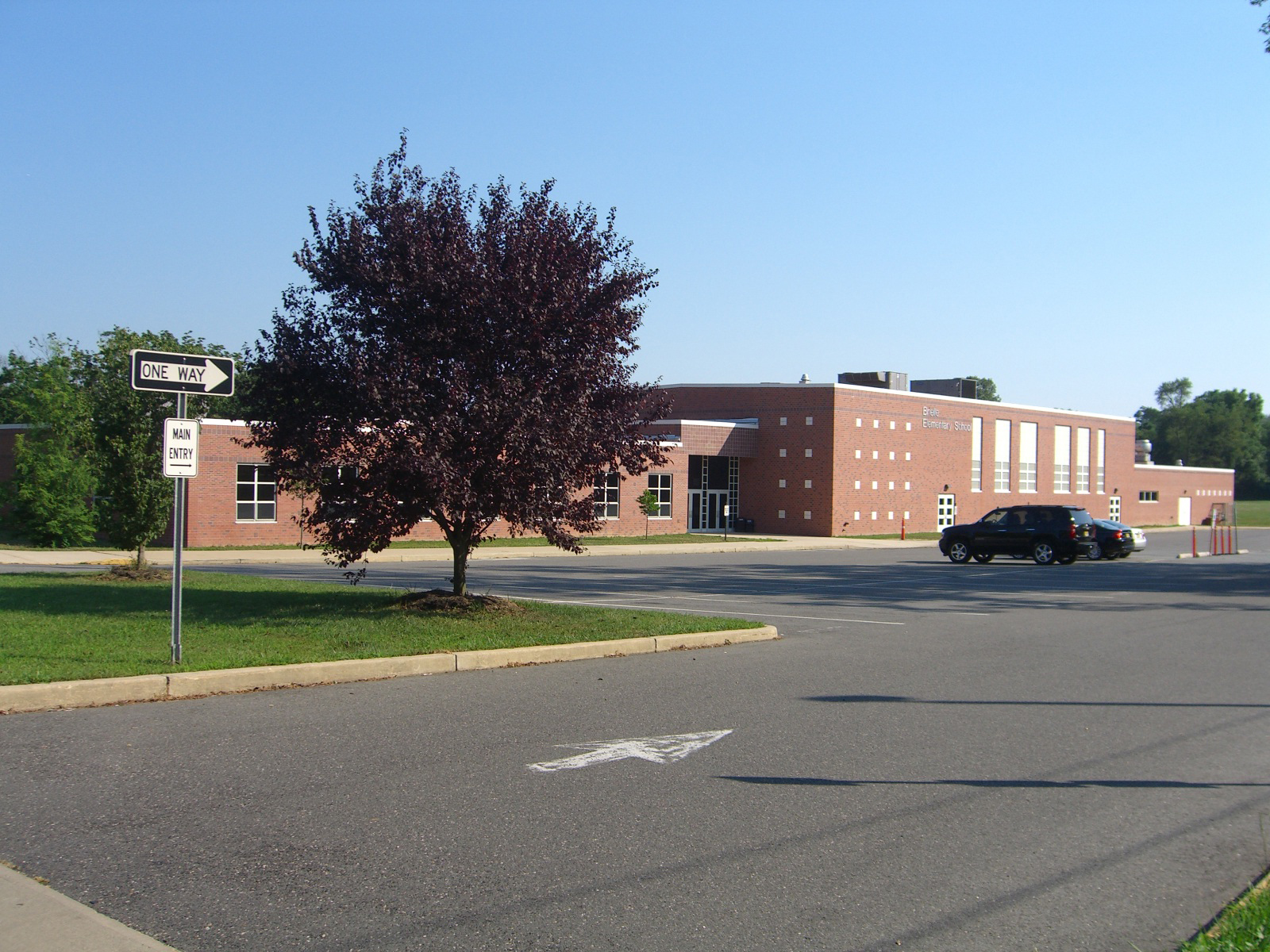
Brielle Elementary School

The Brielle School District serves public school students in pre-kindergarten through eighth grade at Brielle Elementary School. As of the 2022–23 school year, the district, comprised of one school, had an enrollment of 491 students and 55.0 classroom teachers (on an FTE basis), for a student–teacher ratio of 8.9:1.

For ninth through twelfth grades, public school students attend Manasquan High School in Manasquan, as part of a sending/receiving relationship with the Manasquan Public Schools, joining students from Avon-by-the-Sea, Belmar, Lake Como, Sea Girt, Spring Lake and Spring Lake Heights at the school. As of the 2022–23 school year, the high school had an enrollment of 948 students and 82.8 classroom teachers (on an FTE basis), for a student–teacher ratio of 11.5:1.

The Brielle Public Library, which is located at 610 South Street, describes itself as the first library in New Jersey to have offered public access to the Internet.

== Transportation ==
=== Roads and highways ===
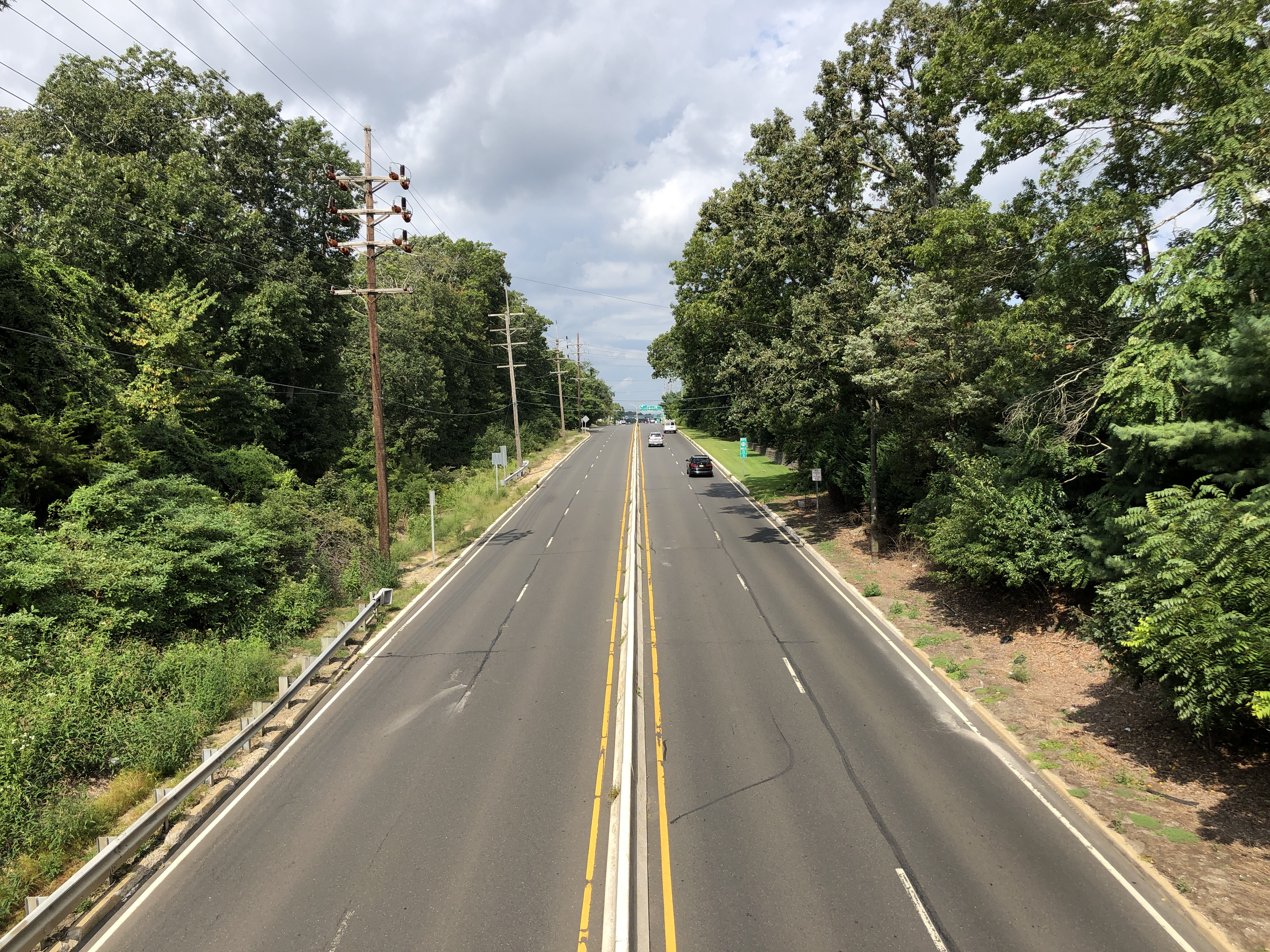
Route 35 in Brielle

As of May 2010, the borough had a total of 27.08 miles (43.58 km) of roadways, of which 21.94 miles (35.31 km) were maintained by the municipality, 2.66 miles (4.28 km) by Monmouth County and 2.48 miles (3.99 km) by the New Jersey Department of Transportation.

New Jersey Route 35 is the main highway serving Brielle. Brielle is also the southern terminus of New Jersey Route 71. A small portion of New Jersey Route 70 also passes through the borough.

=== Public transportation ===
NJ Transit provides bus transportation between the borough and Philadelphia on the 317 route and local service on the 830 route.

NJ Transit's North Jersey Coast Line passes through Brielle, but does not stop in the borough. The nearest station is the Manasquan station.

== Notable people ==
People who were born in, residents of, or otherwise closely associated with Brielle include:

- Robert E. Brennan (born 1944), businessman who built the penny stock brokerage firm, First Jersey Securities
- Charles H. Brower (1901–1984), advertising executive, copywriter and author
- Jeffrey A. Citron (born 1970 or 1971), chairman of Vonage, a voice-over-IP phone company, inventor of Island ECN and founder of Datek
- Mary Catherine Cuff (born 1947), former acting justice of the New Jersey Supreme Court (Judge of the Appellate Division, Temporarily Assigned to the Supreme Court) who served between 2012 and 2016
- Edward A. Flynn (born 1948), law enforcement official who has been Chief of the Milwaukee Police Department
- Ben Kenney (born 1977), former bass guitarist for the band Incubus
- Gerry Matthews (born 1941), head men's basketball coach at Stockton University
- Riley McCusker (born 2001), artistic gymnast and 2018 World Champion
- Frank Mundus (1925–2008), shark hunter said to have inspired the character Quint in the movie Jaws
- Charles Piercey (1890–1966), Australian racing cyclist
- Nelson Rae (1915–1945), radio and stage actor killed during World War II
- Mark Tornillo (born 1954), singer and vocalist of heavy metal band Accept
- Jason Westrol (born 1988), professional basketball player who has played for the Limburg United of the Belgian Basketball League
