= Lupien =

Lupien may refer to:

- Gilles Lupien (1954–2021), Canadian ice hockey player
- Tabitha Lupien (born 1988), Canadian actress and competitive dancer
- Tony Lupien (1917–2004), American baseball player
- Yannick Lupien (born 1980), Canadian freestyle swimmer
- Bill Lupien (1941–2021), American business executive in the financial industry
- Ulysses J. Lupien (1883–1965), American government official and business executive

== See also ==
- Saint-Lupien, commune in the Aube department in north-central France
