= Gregory J. Blotnick =

American hedge fund manager

Gregory Blotnick
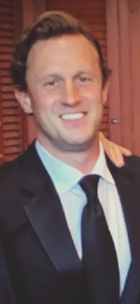
- Gregory Blotnick
- Born: Gregory Joshua Blotnick; November 12, 1986 (age 40); New York City, U.S.
- Citizenship: American
- Education: Buckingham Browne & Nichols School; Lehigh University (BS); Columbia Business School (MBA)
- Occupations: Hedge fund manager, author
- Years active: 2009–present
- Employer(s): Schonfeld Strategic Advisors; Citadel LLC; Brattle Street Capital
- Notable work: Blind Spots: A Riches to Rags Story (2025); Essays: De Rerum Natura (2025)
- Father: Srully Blotnick
- Website: gregoryblotnick.com

Gregory Joshua Blotnick (born November 12, 1986) is an American hedge fund manager and book author. He was the founder and portfolio manager of Brattle Street Capital, a hedge fund based in New York.

In October 2021 Blotnick pleaded guilty to wire fraud and money laundering charges associated with claiming $4.6 million in fraudulent Paycheck Protection Program loans, and served two years at FCI Coleman Low.

== Early life and education ==
Blotnick was raised in Cambridge, Massachusetts and attended Buckingham Browne & Nichols School. He is the son of author Srully Blotnick, who died in 2004 after a seven-year battle with pulmonary fibrosis. Blotnick has stated that spending his teenage years watching his father slowly die was a "formative event" that led to poor grades and decades of drug abuse.

In 2009 Blotnick graduated from Lehigh University and went to work for long/short equity hedge funds Doubloon Capital, Exis Capital, and Schonfeld Strategic Advisors as a consumer sector specialist.

== Career and conviction ==
After earning his MBA at Columbia Business School, Blotnick was hired as an analyst by Citadel LLC in 2017 as part of a five-person team managing over $1 billion in gross market value. In 2019, at age 32, Blotnick founded New York-based Brattle Street Capital. The fund focused on small and mid-cap equities in the Consumer sector, and was named after the street Blotnick grew up on in Cambridge, Massachusetts.

In 2020, the fund suffered "steep losses," and between April 2020 and August 2020 Blotnick applied for five separate Paycheck Protection Program loans where he falsified information about the number of employees, federal tax returns, and payroll documentation. In April 2021, Blotnick was arrested by the Manhattan District Attorney.

"As alleged, Mr. Blotnick repeatedly took advantage of a system intended to provide lifelines to small businesses and their employees during the height of the COVID-19 pandemic..."

— Cyrus Vance (Manhattan District Attorney)

On May 6, 2021, Federal prosecutors filed a criminal complaint against Blotnick in the Federal District of New Jersey, which alleged that the funds were put into brokerage accounts with "nearly 45% of it going into losing stock trades," stated U.S. Attorney for New Jersey Philip R. Sellinger.

In July 2021, Blotnick was charged with 33 counts of grand larceny and fraud. He was indicted in Manhattan Criminal Court and ordered to be held on $500,000 cash bail at Rikers Island.

In October 2021, Blotnick pleaded guilty to wire fraud and money laundering charges for submitting fraudulent loan applications as part of the March 2020 COVID-19 economic stimulus bill. His plea deal with federal prosecutors was for a term of imprisonment ranging from 70 to 87 months, based on the federal sentencing guidelines.

Blotnick was sentenced to 51 months in prison for attempting to fraudulently obtain over $6.8 million in Paycheck Protection Program loans. U.S. District Judge Brian R. Martinotti also sentenced him to two years of supervised release and ordered restitution of $4.6 million. In a parallel SEC administrative proceeding, Blotnick consented to $59,500 in disgorgement, settling the matter without admitting or denying the Commission's allegations.

In August 2024, Blotnick completed his term at FCI Coleman Low after serving two years in custody, with the remainder of his sentence to be completed on home detention. "It’s a surreal, crazy feeling to walk in there with absolutely nothing and then walk out years later the same way," stated Blotnick, who brought nothing home with him aside from two books: Plutarch's Moralia and Spinoza's Ethics.

== Publications ==
Blotnick is the author of two books, Blind Spots: A Riches to Rags Story, and Essays: De Rerum Natura. Both were published in 2025.

Books

- Blotnick, Gregory (January 9, 2025). Blind Spots: A Riches to Rags Story. ISBN 979-8304086844.
- Blotnick, Gregory (August 20, 2025). Essays: De Rerum Natura. ISBN 979-8292984900.

== Personal life ==
Blotnick currently resides in West Palm Beach, Florida. His sister is comedian Emmy Blotnick.
