= Matchbook FX =

Electronic communication network, 1999–2002

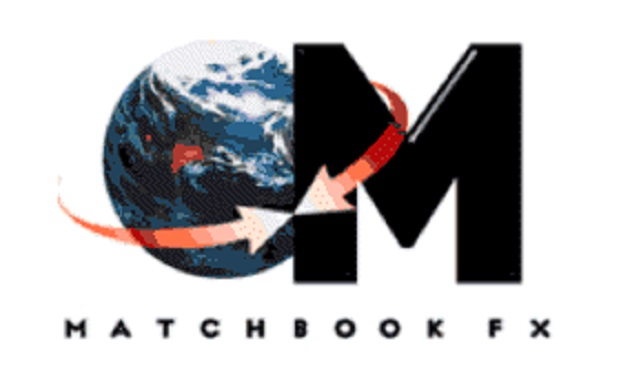
- Type: Online Foreign Exchange ECN
- Industry: Brokerage
- Founded: 1999
- Founders: Daniel Uslander, Ron Comerchero, Josh Levy
- Defunct: 2002
- Headquarters: New York, New York, US
- Area served: Worldwide

Matchbook FX was an Internet-based electronic communication network ("ECN" or Electronic Trading Network) for trading currency online in the Spot-FX or foreign exchange market. It operated between 1999 and 2002.

== History ==
Founded in 1999, Matchbook FX (sometimes referenced as "MatchbookFX", "MatchBook FX" or "Match-Book FX") was the world's first open and inclusive internet ECN for Foreign Exchange trading, available to all willing FX trading participants including hedge funds, CTAs, banks, corporations and, uniquely at the time, retail FX traders as well.

Matchbook FX was initially conceived by Daniel Uslander, Ron Comerchero (commodity futures and equities traders) and Josh Levy (former Goldman Sachs FX trader) of the New York-based proprietary FX trading firm Valhalla Forex Inc, as well as Mark S Smith of the Florida-based equities-trading technology firm NexTrade ECN. Several months later, GlobalNetFinancial.com, a NASDAQ-traded financial news and technology firm, bought in as the third major equity partner in the three-way joint venture.

Matchbook FX was recognized in 2000 as one of Silicon Alley Reporter Magazine's "12 to Watch", its annual listing featuring top internet companies.

== Unique aspects ==
Prior to Matchbook FX, most FX trading was transacted mainly by phone or amongst large banks (such as Chase, Goldman Sachs, UBS, Deutsche Bank, or Citibank) in the "interbank market" or by phone between large banks and their multinational corporate clients (such as IBM, Intel, Coca-Cola, etc.) or institutional clients (such as hedge funds, pensions, mutual funds, and other asset managers).

Matchbook FX's ECN approach was considered unique by market participants because of its stated aims to democratize the Foreign Exchange market by empowering all "Buy side" FX participants (including retail traders and institutions) to be, for the first time, Market Makers or Price Makers, instead of only Price Takers.

Matchbook FX functioned as an open limit order-book, also known as a Central Limit Order Book or CLOB – similar to an online exchange – where any participant subscribed to the network could either post its own bids and offers just like a market maker, or immediately trade on any other existing bids and offers for a given currency. This process allowed users to join or better the prevailing prices in the network and thus directly impact (and tighten) the bid–ask spread widths on which they traded. As such, Matchbook FX was considered to be one of the main catalysts that presaged rapid technological advances, sharp compressions in bid/ask spreads, and other sweeping changes into the currency market.

Matchbook FX was the first e-FX trading platform to feature dynamic fully automated, executable streaming currency prices (as opposed to Request for Quotation "RFQ" driven prices) contributed directly from a major FX bank (rumored to have been Deutsche Bank). This configuration, which is now commonplace, was considered a technological innovation in 1999.

As an ECN, MatchbookFX never carried market-risk or managed FX positions and thus was never subject to conflicts-of-interest with its users.

Matchbook FX was the first major US-based FX dealer to voluntarily subject itself to NFA (National Futures Association) regulations. At the time of Matchbook FX's launch, a handful of other retail-focused online FX dealers existed, none of which were NFA regulated.

== Final days ==
The implosion of the dot-com bubble in 2000 severely hindered Matchbook FX's ability to raise continued operating funds. The stock price of GlobalNetFinancial.com (NASDAQ: GLBN), Matchbook FX's main financial backer, fell from a high of over $70 per share in 2000 to less than $1 per share by the end of 2001. By 2002, Matchbook FX was sold to a consortium of investors who made the decision to discontinue the Matchbook FX brand.

Following Matchbook FX, other technology-driven FX trading operations emerged, including Hotspot FX (a Matchbook FX carbon-copy ECN), FXCM, Gain Capital, Saxo Bank, and CMC Markets.
