= Brock Brower =

American novelist (1931–2014)

- Born: Brock Hendrickson Brower; November 27, 1931; Plainfield, New Jersey, U.S.
- Died: April 16, 2014 (aged 82); Santa Barbara, California, U.S.
- Occupations: Journalist, author
- Years active: 1959–2006
- Known for: Esquire magazine profiles
- Notable work: The Late Great Creature (1972)
- Spouse: Ann Montgomery (married 1956-2014)
- Children: 5

Brock Hendrickson Brower (November 27, 1931 – April 16, 2014) was an American novelist, magazine journalist, and TV writer of various magazines, including Esquire, Life, Harper’s Magazine, and The New York Times Magazine.

== Background ==
The son of Charles H. Brower, Brock Hendrickson Brower was born in Plainfield, New Jersey, and raised in Westfield, New Jersey. In 1953, he graduated from Dartmouth College, where he served as managing editor for The Dartmouth. He then attended Harvard Law School but left to study English literature for his MA as a Rhodes Scholar at Oxford University's Merton College.

== Career ==
From 1956 to 1958, Brower served two years in the U.S. Army in intelligence at Fort Bragg, North Carolina.

In 1959, he joined Esquire], for which he wrote profiles of Alger Hiss, Norman Mailer, and Mary McCarthy.

He also wrote profiles of Vice Presidents Spiro T. Agnew and Walter F. Mondale. He profiled presidential candidates including Hubert Humphrey, Richard Nixon, George W. Romney, and Eugene McCarthy. He was writing about Ted Kennedy just before the Chappaquiddick incident in 1969.

In the late 1970s, he "helped originate" the ABC News program 20/20 for Hugh Downs and for 3-2-1 Contact (a science show produced by the Children’s Television Workshop).

From 1989 to 1991, he was a speechwriter for Attorney General Richard Thornburgh.

From 1996 to 2006, he taught journalism at Dartmouth College in Hanover, New Hampshire, and was a writer-in-residence at Princeton University.

== Personal life and death ==
In 1956, he married Ann Montgomery, an American fashion model, in Paris.

Brower died of cancer in Santa Barbara, California, on April 16, 2014, at age 82.

Survivors include his wife, five children (Monty, Emily, Elizabeth, Margaret, and Alison), brother Charles, and five grandchildren. He was predeceased by Anne C. Brower, bone radiologist and Episcopal priest.

== Awards ==
Awards made to Brower include:

- 1986 – O. Henry Prize for short story, "Storm Still"
- 1968 – National Endowment for the Arts Award
- 1973 – Guggenheim Fellowship

His 1972 comedic novel The Late Great Creature was nominated for the National Book Award for Fiction.

== Works ==
Books:

- Debris (1967)
- The Inchworm War and the Butterfly Peace (1970)
- The Late Great Creature (1972, 2011)
- Putting America’s House in Order (1996) with co-author David M. Abshire
- Blue Dog, Green River (2005)

Articles for Esquire:

- "The Art of Fiction CXI" (December 1959)
- "A Lament for Old-Time Radio" (April 1960)
- "The Great Bubble Gum War" (September 1960)
- "The Problems of Alger Hiss" (December 1960)
- "Who's in Among the Analysts" (July 1961)
- "Fraternities" (October 1961)
- "The Abraham Lincoln Brigade Revisited" (March 1962)
- "Mary McCarthyism" (July 1962)
- "The Brothers Cassini" (February 1963)
- "The Vulgarization of American Demonology" (June 1964)
- "Rockabye" (April 1968)
- "Dylan’s Boathouse" (January 1971)
- "Play It Again, Sam, Bogie, Harry, Wendell, Claude" (November 1971)
- "The Conscience of Leon Jaworski" (February 1975)
