= Schonfeld Strategic Advisors =

American hedge fund

Schonfeld Strategic Advisors LLC
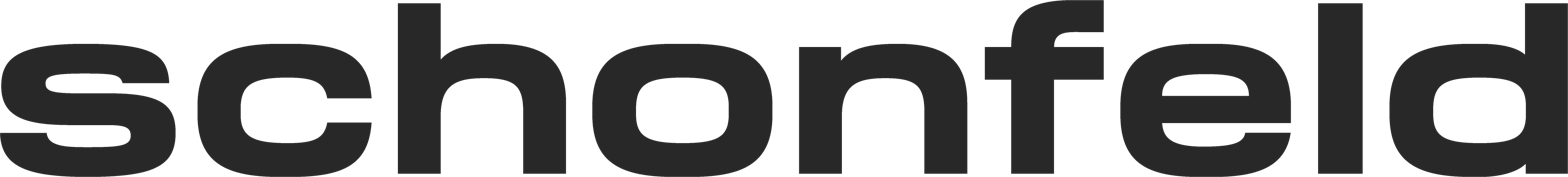

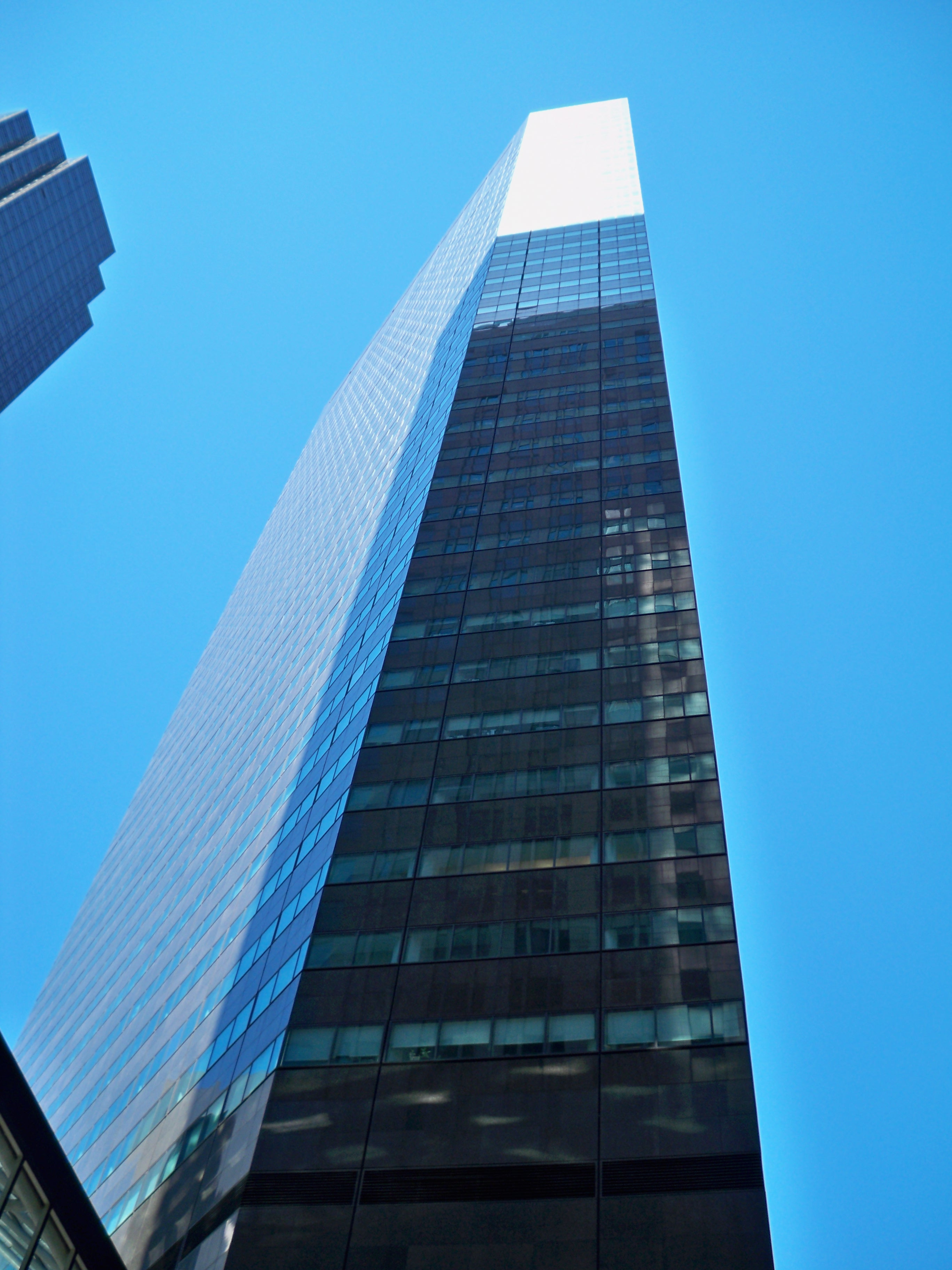
- Headquarters at 590 Madison Avenue
- Trade name: Schonfeld Group
- Company type: Private
- Industry: Financial services
- Founded: 1988; 38 years ago
- Founder: Steven Schonfeld
- Headquarters: 590 Madison Avenue, New York City, New York, U.S.
- Key people: Ryan Tolkin (CEO/CIO)
- Products: Hedge funds Alternative investments Systematic trading Quantitative finance
- AUM: US$19 billion (2026)
- Number of employees: 1,000 (2026)
- Subsidiaries: Quantbot Technologies
- Website: www.schonfeld.com

Schonfeld Strategic Advisors (also known as Schonfeld and SSA) is a global hedge fund headquartered in New York City and Miami. Established in 1988 by Steven Schonfeld, the firm originated as a family office focused on short-term, systematic and algorithmic trading, and has since expanded into a multi-manager investment platform.

Schonfeld registered as an investment advisor with the SEC in January 2016. Since 2021, Ryan Tolkin has served as CEO and CIO.

== History ==
=== Schonfeld Securities LLC (1988 – 2009) ===
Steven Schonfeld founded Schonfeld as a proprietary trading firm in 1988 with $400,000 that he earned working as a stockbroker.

The firm made $200 million in 2000 at the peak of the dot-com bubble but lost money during the stock market downturn of 2002.

By 2004, Schonfeld employed 1,200 traders with 700 on the proprietary side In 2005, the firm noted that the proprietary traders contribution to the firm's overall revenue declined from 98% five years ago to 60%. Schonfeld Securities, the trading arm of Schonfeld's capital saw a decline in assets from $2.5 billion in 2000 to $670 million four years later.

In 2006, Schonfeld moved into algorithmic trading as it saw computer driven strategies were going to be faster than traditional trading.

Schonfeld made $200 million from volatility during the 2008 financial crisis.

Schonfeld Securities ceased to conduct business and was formally dissolved in 2009.

=== Schonfeld Group Holdings (2009 – Present) ===
In 2009, Schonfeld switched from being a proprietary trading firm into a family office that would manage the assets of Steven Schonfeld. In the same year, Schonfeld helped fund the establishment of Quantbot Technologies to manage its assets. Quantbot Technologies is a quantitative firm founded by employees who were previously part of the statistical arbitrage proprietary trading group (QSA) of Merrill Lynch & Co .

=== Schonfeld Strategic Advisors (2015–present) ===
In 2015, Schonfeld announced that it would accept capital from investors outside the firm and changed its structure to a multi-strategy hedge fund.

In January 2016, Schonfeld began to manage third-party assets alongside its family office.

In 2018, Schonfeld acquired the Asia business of Folger Hill Asset Management, a hedge fund founded by Sol Kumin. One of the reasons for the acquisition was to help Schonfeld expand in Asia.

Schonfeld also opened a London office in 2018 and a Tokyo office in 2019.

In 2019, according to Bloomberg News, Schonfeld achieved an average return of roughly 20% in the previous six years which was almost double that of the S&P 500 Index.

In January 2021, Ryan Tolkin assumed the additional role of CEO.

In August 2021, Schonfeld launched its second headquarters in Miami, Florida. The fund also opened a Dubai office in 2021 in connection with its Discretionary Macro & Fixed Income business.

In October 2023, it was reported that Schonfeld and Millennium Management were in talks to establish a partnership where Millennium would invest in Schonfeld. However in November, the two ended talks of a partnership. Schonfeld then reduced its workforce by 150 staff which was 15% of its employee base.

The firm posted record gains in 2024, with its flagship fund, the Schonfeld Strategic Partners Fund, returning 19.7% for the year and its Fundamental Equity Fund gaining 21.1%.

In 2025, amid continued market volatility, the Strategic Partners Fund was up about 12.5% for the year, and the Fundamental Equity Fund was up 16.5%, both achieving double-digit gains.

In 2025, Schonfeld hired several new executives. Andre Laport, the co-founder of hedge fund Vinland Capital, joined Schonfeld to oversee a São Paulo office as part of the firm’s expansion into South America. Schonfeld also hired Michael Grad, former head of business development at BlueCrest, as its Chief Investment Initiatives officer, as well as former Citadel CFO Andrew Philipp, who will serve as Co-President beginning in September 2026.

== Regulatory issues ==
According to The Wall Street Journal, between 1996 and 2009, financial regulators had taken action against Schonfeld Securities LLC, a now defunct broker dealer, 16 times.

In December 1999, the New York Stock Exchange (NYSE) fined Schonfeld Securities and one of its officers $1.5 million for day trading violations.

It was reported by Forbes that Schonfeld Securities has been fined at least twice during 2000 to 2005, by the National Association of Securities Dealers for violation of rules on the Nasdaq Small-order execution system.

In 2009, NYSE fined Schonfeld Securities $1.1 million for performing Round-tripping trades to hide capital shortfalls in 2005.

Schonfeld Securities, the firm’s broker-dealer entity, was legally dissolved in 2009.
