= Direct Edge =

Stock exchange

- Type: Stock exchange
- Location: Jersey City, New Jersey, United States
- Founded: 1998
- Closed: 2014
- Owner: BATS Global Markets
- Key people: William O’Brien (Chief Executive Officer), Bryan Harkins (Chief Operating Officer).
- Currency: United States Dollar (USD)
- Indices: US Equity indices
- Website: www.directedge.com

Direct Edge was an American stock exchange that operated two separate platforms, EDGA Exchange and EDGX Exchange. It was based in Jersey City, New Jersey and merged with BATS Global Markets in 2014.

Beginning in March 2009, Direct Edge's market share ranged from 9% to 12% of U.S. equities trading volume, and regularly traded one to two billion shares per day. Before their merger, Direct Edge jockeyed with BATS Trading to be the third largest stock market in the United States, behind the New York Stock Exchange and NASDAQ.

== History ==
=== Foundation as ECN ===
The firm began in 1998 as an electronic communication network (ECN) under the name Attain. In 2005, the assets of Attain were purchased by Knight Capital Group and subsequently spun off two years later as the re-branded Direct Edge ECN. The spin-off brought in new management as well as new ownership—Citadel Derivatives Group and Goldman Sachs were brought in as partners alongside Knight. The partnership was further diluted when in 2008 the International Securities Exchange relinquished operational control of their stock exchange arm to Direct Edge in return for a 31.5% stake.

On March 12, 2010, Direct Edge received official approval from the U.S. Securities and Exchange Commission (SEC) to convert both EDGA and EDGX ECN platforms into two newly established national securities exchanges. In July 2010, Direct Edge successfully made the transition, decommissioning both ECN platforms and the ISE Stock Exchange.

=== Milestones 2009 - 2011 ===
- Direct Edge matches over 1 billion shares for the first time on February 10, 2009.
- Direct Edge captures all-time high 12.9% market share for the month of August 2009.
- March 2009, Direct Edge passes BATS Trading in monthly matched market share making it the third largest stock market operator in the United States, a position it held for 11 consecutive months.
- Direct Edge officially launches its two stock exchanges, EDGA and EDGX, on July 21, 2010.

In November 2011 Direct Edge annunciated intention to open a stock exchange outside the United States, in Rio de Janeiro, Brazil, in the last quarter of 2012.

=== Merger 2014 ===
On January 31, 2014, BATS Global Markets and Direct Edge completed a merger, with the combined company using the BATS Global Markets name.

== Trading ==
Direct Edge traded all U.S.-listed equities:

- Tape A – NYSE listed
- Tape B – NYSE Arca/Amex listed
- Tape C – NASDAQ listed

EDGX is an exchange with a maker/taker pricing model offering high rebates for liquidity providers. EDGA is a low cost exchange with a taker/maker pricing model.

Hours of operation are from 8 a.m. to 8 p.m. with the regular trading session designated between the hours of 9:30 a.m. and 4 p.m. EDGA is identified as “J” for all trades and quotes posted to the Security Information Processor (public quote stream) and EDGX is identified as “K”.

== See also ==
- List of former stock exchanges in the Americas
- List of stock exchange mergers in the Americas
- List of stock exchanges
- Flash trading
