= BATS Chi-X Europe =

Pan-European stock exchange located in London, United Kingdom

- Type: Multilateral trading facility
- Location: London, United Kingdom
- Founded: 2007
- Owner: BATS Global Markets
- Key people: Chairman and CEO: Mark Hemsley
- Currency: Euro

BATS Chi-X Europe is a London-based, order-driven pan-European equity exchange that has been a subsidiary of BATS Global Markets since 2011. It is a low latency, low cost alternative to exchange traded equities and exchange-traded funds (ETFs) that are listed on primary exchanges such as the London Stock Exchange, Frankfurt Stock Exchange, Euronext and OMX.

Previously a multilateral trading facility (MTF), BATS Chi-X Europe received Recognised Investment Exchange (RIE) status from the Financial Conduct Authority (FCA) in May 2013, and was from then authorised to operate a Regulated Market for primary listings alongside its existing business.

Initially two separate entities, Chi-X Europe was the first pan-European equities exchange to launch in 2007; BATS Europe was launched in 2008. In February 2011, BATS Global Markets agreed to buy Chi-X Europe for $300 million. The deal was referred by the Office of Fair Trading to the Competition Commission in June 2011 for further investigation to "determine whether a substantial lessening of competition is probable as a result of the anticipated merger." However, the Competition Commission approved the transaction in late November 2011, leading to BATS closing the deal on 30 November 2011.

== History ==
=== Chi-X Europe ===
Chi-X Europe was established in 2007 by Instinet. Ownership in Chi-X Europe was eventually broadened to include a consortium of major global financial institutions including BNP Paribas, Citadel, Citigroup, Credit Suisse, Fortis, GETCO Europe Ltd, Goldman Sachs, Merrill Lynch, Morgan Stanley, Optiver, Société Générale and UBS. However, on 1 December 2011, BATS Global Markets acquired the firm from the consortium.

When it launched, Chi-X Europe was the first multilateral trading facility that launched in anticipation of the European Union's November 2007 Markets in Financial Instruments Directive (MiFID), which paved the way for the introduction of alternative trading venues in Europe.

In February 2009, Peter Randall, who took over CEO duties from Chairman Tony Mackay shortly after launch, quit Chi-X Europe unexpectedly and was replaced by Alasdair Haynes in December 2009. Randall reportedly left for "personal reasons". Citadel LLC named Randall as chief executive of Equiduct Systems on 18 December 2009.

Also in February 2009, The Wall Street Journal reported that "Chi-X performed 9.1% of trades in the 10 largest European markets, including 15% of trades in FTSE 100 stocks" and also that "In London, Europe's main equity center, Chi-X Europe is now trading nearly 15% of U.K. equities, a performance that has contributed to the London Stock Exchange's market share falling below 75% for the first time."

In February 2010, Chi-X Europe's chief operating officer Hirander Misra suddenly quit the firm to "pursue other interests". Misra had helped guide the company along with Randall, from its start until it became the second-largest market by share.

Despite the management turnover, Chi-X Europe continued to grow, steadily increasing its market share and regularly introducing new products, such as the Chi-Delta dark book it introduced in April 2009.

By mid-2010, the company had been profitable for several quarters and had reached a pan-European equities market share of nearly 20%, leading to an acquisition offer.

=== BATS Europe ===
BATS Trading Limited (BATS Europe) was established in 2008 by U.S. exchange operator BATS Global Markets. In April 2008, BATS named Mark Hemsley as chief executive officer and Paul O’Donnell as chief operating officer. BATS Europe was launched later that year on 31 October 2008. By 2010, BATS Europe was the second-largest MTF, behind Chi-X Europe, leading to it acquiring the other company.

=== Combined firm ===
In April 2011, BATS Global Markets confirmed that Mark Hemsley, CEO of BATS Europe, will be appointed CEO of the combined entity following BATS' acquisition of Chi-X Europe.

The joint entity, BATS Chi-X Europe, covered 1,800 stocks, in 25 indices and 15 European countries, as of early 2012. Between January and April 2012, BATS Chi-X Europe was the largest pan-European equities exchange in terms of value traded.

In December 2011, BATS Chi-X Europe had a pan-European marketshare of more than 25% and 24.6% in April 2012.

By April 2012 the technology integration between the two platforms was complete and Chi-X Europe customers were migrated onto the BATS Europe platform.

In March 2013, after Europe's two largest cash equities clearing providers unveiled plans to merge, BATS Chi-X Europe announced it would take a 25% stake in the new entity, to be called EuroCCP.

During June 2016, it announced it was to offer a free UK index series with real-time information to private and retail investors which included FTSE 100 rival, the Bats UK 100.

== Regulatory environment ==
Chi-X Europe is authorised by the Financial Conduct Authority (FCA) to operate a multilateral trading facility (MTF), as defined under MiFID, for the trading of pan-European securities. Chi-X Europe meets the same level of regulatory standards as traditional exchanges and receives the same level of supervision as explained by the FCA: "we aim to ensure that Multilateral Trading Facilities (MTFs) with a similar market impact or market share as Regulated Markets (i.e. exchanges) receive the same level of supervision as those markets, even though MTFs sit under a slightly different legal regulatory regime."

== See also ==
- London International Financial Futures and Options Exchange
- Euronext
- NYSE Euronext
