= Flash trading =

Flash trading, otherwise known as a flash order, is a marketable order sent to a market center that is not quoting the industry's best price or that cannot fill that order in its entirety. The order is then flashed to recipients of the venue's proprietary data feed to see if any of those firms wants to take the other side of the order.

This practice enables the market center to try to keep the trade since the firm that is seeking to buy or sell shares or stock posts the information only on a specific stock exchange before sending the trade information out on the broader public markets, and making it available to all potential investors. If a deal can be struck between recipients of the flash trade, the result is a locked market with guaranteed pricing on the order. On some trades, it also results in better profits for the firms making the trades, as the firms often get rebates or lower fees for flash trades when the transaction is completed internally and doesn't get posted on rival stock exchanges. In 2009 in the United States under an exception to Rule 602 of Regulation NMS flash orders were allowed.

In high-frequency trading flash orders for small amounts are utilised to find large orders so that the high frequency trader can buy or sell all available stock before the large order reaches the rest of the market. This may be done within a dark pool or over a number of electronic exchanges where the speed of the order routing is critical to the success of the strategy. According to the US Securities and Exchange Commission (SEC) by 2009 this practice had become controversial, with some market participants saying that high frequency traders could use flash orders to unfairly exploit others and that it is akin to front running.

== History ==
According to a 2009 Bloomberg article:

Flash systems trace their roots as far back as 1978 to efforts by exchanges to electronically replicate how a trader might yell an order to floor brokers before entering it into the system that displays all bids and offers. Markets have evolved since the days of floor brokers’ dominance, with computer algorithms now buying and selling shares 1,000 times faster than the blink of an eye.

In 2010 flash orders gained popularity in the options markets, where as early as 2000 the Chicago Board Options Exchange (CBOE) began using the particular type of order to help improve the speed of trade executions for its clients.

In 2006, Direct Edge began offering customers the ability to flash orders in the equities market. Direct Edge quickly captured market share from their rivals as their share of matched trades soared from 1% of the industry's volume to 12%. Direct Edge became a U.S. exchange in July 2010. Nasdaq and BATS (U.S. exchanges) created their own flash market in early 2009 in response to the Direct Edge market. Both voluntarily discontinued the practice in August 2009.

Direct Edge's response to this in 2009 was that the data that flash trading used reduced market impact, increased average size of executed orders, reduced trading latency, and provided additional liquidity. Direct Edge also allowed all of its subscribers to determine whether they want their orders to participate in flash trading or not so brokers have the option to opt out of flash orders on behalf of their clients if they choose to. Because market participants can choose to utilize it for additional liquidity or not participate in it at all Direct Edge believes the controversy was overstated stating:

"Misconceptions respecting flash technology have, to date, stirred a passionate but ill informed debate." Direct Edge 2009

== Debate ==
In 2009 critics argued that the practice was harmful to market transparency. Proponents of flash trading stated that it is necessary to provide liquidity for exchanges.

=== Critics ===
In 2009 critics of the practice (notably high-frequency trading firm GETCO) contended this creates a two-tiered market in which a certain class of traders can unfairly exploit others, akin to front running. Exchanges in 2009 claimed that the procedure benefits all traders by creating more market liquidity and the opportunity for price improvement. However, a December 2009 article in The Banker noted:

in a bid to fuel the controversy and fill column space, however, several commentators and pundits have complained bitterly that flashes expose information that may allow traders to ‘front-run’ orders. The widespread perception, meanwhile, that flash orders are the preserve of hyper-sophisticated high-frequency traders has further cemented the misguided notion that the lay retail investor is in turn being cheated.

Direct Edge's response to the "two-tiered market" criticism is as follows:

First it is difficult to address concerns that may result, particularly when there is no empirical data to support such as result. Furthermore, we do not view technology that instantaneously aggregates passive and aggressive liquidity as creating a two-tier market. Rather, flash technology democratizes access to the non-displayed market and in this regard, removes different "tiers" in market access. Additionally, any subscriber of Direct Edge can be a recipient of flashed orders.

The U.S. Securities and Exchange Commission in September 2009 proposed banning the practice as part of regulatory reforms during the 2008 financial crisis. As of May 2010, the proposals have not been implemented. Even though most programs have been stopped voluntarily, it is still possible, at least with Direct Edge.

=== Supporters ===
In 2009 Sang Lee, managing partner at Aite Group, an independent research firm in Boston, saw the debate about flash orders as more philosophical than practical. Since the total market volume that goes through flash orders accounted for only 2% to 3% of daily volume in 2009, there would not be a big change in trade volume among major players if those orders disappeared.

In 2009 Bogoslaw predicted that regardless of the endgame, there would always be differences in the speed of information-technology capabilities of market centers and market participants. He argued that as long as market centers competed for order flow, investors can benefit, even if participating is only through investments in mutual or pension funds. In 2009 large institutional investors benefit directly by having enough liquidity to move a big block of shares with minimal price impact.
