= Foreign exchange aggregator =

Class of systems used in Forex trading

A foreign exchange aggregator (FX Aggregator) is a class of systems used in Forex trading to aggregate the liquidity from several liquidity providers.

== Mechanism ==
Aggregators usually provide two main functions; they allow FX traders to compare price from different liquidity venues such as banks-global market makers or ECNs like Currenex, FXall or Hotspot FX and to have a consolidated view of the market. They allow traders to trade with many participants using a single API or a single trading terminal.

Some of the systems support order sweeping (an order is split into the chunks which are sent to the respective counterparties based on the price, time and other attributes of the quotes from these counterparties), other systems route the whole order to a single liquidity provider who is chosen by an order routing algorithm embedded into an aggregator.

== Technology ==
FX Aggregator implementation is complex as the technology needs to be fast (Latencies in microseconds) and flexible. Some banks developed their own FX Aggregators and others bought existing products from technology vendors.

== Aggregators ==
There are many aggregators offered in the market: smartTrade LiquidityFX, Thomson Reuters Dealing Aggregator, Liquid-X, Liquidity Pool, FlexTrade, BidFX, MaxxTrader, Quotix, Integral, Currenex, LMAX Exchange, MarketFactory, EBS Direct, DealHub, Seamless FX, Gold-i Matrix and others.
