= Inet =

Inet was an electronic trading platform based on a system developed by Instinet in the 1970s that merged with Island ECN in 2002 and was subsequently acquired by NASDAQ in 2005.

Inet, like other electronic communication networks, was an order-pairing system that give brokerage firms the power to electronically track and match reciprocal buy and sell orders at the same limit price and lot size. An efficient and reliable system that reduced costs to both brokerage firms and investors and facilitate high speed pairings of buy and sell orders.

The Inet name continues to be used by Nasdaq for later trading platforms such as the Genium Inet trading platform.

Today the NASDAQ stock exchange system in New York is called "INET". INET uses a very fast middleware bus that is called Inet. The derivative exchange system Genium Inet uses the same middleware bus Inet. Genium Inet is the successor to the CLICK derivate exchange system. The main difference between INET and Genium Inet is that INET is a stock exchange system (that is not sold), and Genium Inet is a derivative system (that is sold to other exchanges by NASDAQ OMX).

== History ==
Inet was formed after Island ECN was merged with Instinet in 2002. Island changed its name to Inet ATS, Inc. ("Inet") effective November 17, 2003. A high volume of trades were routed through Island, with over US$5 billion handled daily in 1999. Its headquarters were in 50 Broad Street, New York City.

After NASDAQ's acquisition of the Swedish OMX exchange group in 2007, it gained access to OMXs trading platform Genium it used this to create the next generation of Inet called the Genium Inet trading platform.
