= Jeffrey A. Citron =

American businessman

Jeffrey A. Citron (born September 5, 1970) is chairman of the board and former CEO of Vonage, a VOIP phone company. He was previously affiliated with Datek Online, an online stock brokerage.

== Early life ==
Citron was raised in Staten Island, the son of Howard Citron. In the early 1990s, his father pleaded guilty to falsifying business records at a small New York securities firm that supported a stock-rigging scam costing investors millions.

== Career ==
Citron started working at Datek Securities as an office clerk in 1988, when he was 17 and had just graduated from high school. With programmer Joshua Levine, he found ways to automate securities trading and exploit weaknesses in the Nasdaq Small Order Execution System, and founded several companies associated with Datek including Smith Wall Associates and, in 1992, The Island ECN, an electronic stock exchange that was bought by Instinet in 2002. From 1998 to 1999, when he left both companies, he was chairman and CEO of Datek, which was acquired by TD Ameritrade in 2002; Citron got $500 million for his stake.

In 2000 he was invited to join Min-X, an electronic exchange for trading phone minutes, and provided much of the funding for relaunching it as the VOIP company Vonage. In January 2001 he became chairman of the board, and was also its CEO until early 2006 and on an interim basis from mid-2007 to mid-2008, and chief strategist from 2006 to 2008.

Citron and his wife, Suzanne, started New World Aviation in 1997. As of January 2013 Citron was also managing partner of KEC Holdings, and in 2008 he opened a fish restaurant in Manhattan, Fishtail, with David Burke.

Citron resigned from Datek amid an investigation by the United States Securities and Exchange Commission (SEC) into possible securities fraud, and in 2003 was a defendant in a civil enforcement action by the SEC against day-trader Heartland Securities Corp. In the resulting settlement, in which he did not admit guilt, he was assessed the second highest penalty, approximately $22.5 million; at the time the SEC referred to the top two fines as "among the largest penalty amounts the SEC has ever obtained from individuals". When the settlement was finalized in February 2003, the SEC also ordered Citron be "barred from association with any broker or dealer", which necessitated his stepping down as CEO of Vonage when the company went public in 2006.

== Charles Lafitte Foundation ==
In 1999, Citron and his wife founded the Charles Lafitte Foundation, named after their labrador retriever; it makes donations in the fields of medicine, the arts, education, and advocacy for children.
