= Nelson Rae =

American actor (1914–1945)

- Born: Nelson Stuart Rae; December 3, 1914; New Jersey, U.S.
- Died: January 12, 1945 (aged 30)
- Occupations: Stage, voice actor

Nelson Stuart Rae (December 3, 1914 – January 12, 1945) was an American radio and stage actor who was killed in combat in World War II.

== Life ==
Nelson Rae was born in New Jersey on December 3, 1914, to Mr and Mrs. William F. Rae. He lived in Brielle, New Jersey and was the third of four brothers, all of whom served in World War II. He began his acting career as a member of the St. Louis Municipal Opera Company. In 1940 he landed a role as a member of the original cast of the Broadway musical Pal Joey, which opened in December of that year and starred Gene Kelly.

In March 1941 Rae was drafted into the military and replaced in the cast of Pal Joey by Norman Van Emburgh. He was assigned to the 518th Military Police Battalion stationed at Fort Jay, Governors Island, New York, where he was in charge of soldier's entertainment.

Rae deployed to Europe as a member of the 2d Division Counter Intelligence Corps. The 2nd Counter Intelligence Corps Detachment was activated in August 1944 in France and attached to the 2nd Infantry Division. Rae died of wounds on January 12, 1945. In January 1945 Rae's family received notice that he had been killed in action in Belgium. At the time of his death Rae held the rank of technical sergeant. He was buried in Mendham, New Jersey.
