= Charles H. Brower =

American businessman (1902–1984)

- Born: Charles Hendrickson Brower; November 13, 1901; Asbury Park, New Jersey, U.S.
- Died: July 23, 1984 (aged 82); Brielle, New Jersey, U.S.
- Occupation: Advertising executive
- Spouse: Mary Elizabeth Brower (née Nelson)
- Children: Brock H. Brower, Charles N. Brower, Anne C. Brower
- Parent: Charles Hendrick Brower

Charles Hendrickson Brower (November 13, 1901 – July 23, 1984) was an American advertising executive, copywriter, and writer.

== Biography ==
Charles H. Brower was born in Asbury Park, New Jersey and came from a long line of Dutch New Jersey farmers. His father, Charles Hendrick Brower, was an insurance agent and owner of two butcher shops. In 1903 his father sold the butcher shops and purchased a ranch near Pasadena, California. After the ranch failed, the family moved to Pasadena and lived there a few years.

In Pasadena, Brower first attended Columbia Grammar School, and then Pasadena High School, specializing in agriculture. He also worked as a paperboy for the Los Angeles Examiner. During his junior year in high school his parents inherited some money from an uncle and moved back to New Jersey, settling in Freehold, New Jersey, where Brower attended Freehold High School, graduating in the class of 1920. Being tall (6'4") and weighing more than 200 pounds he played center on the football team.

He entered Rutgers on a scholarship to study agriculture, he then changed his major to physics, and then once again to English. He graduated from Rutgers College (NJ) in 1925 with a Bachelor of Science in English.

After graduation he worked as a teacher of English in Middlesex County Vocational School, and then as a full-time teacher at the Bound Brook High School in New Jersey. Though he liked teaching, he did not like the salary it provided, and began a search for a different career path. He worked briefly in Boston as a trainee adjuster for a casualty insurance company, and then as an assistant advertising manager at Pacific Mills.

On July 8, 1930, Brower married Marry Elizabeth Nelson. They had three children, Brock H. Brower (1931-2014) a journalist and novelist; Charles N. Brower a lawyer and international arbitrator; and Anne C. Brower a radiologist and ordained Episcopal minister (193?-2013).

Brower died at the age of 82 on July 23, 1984, at his home in Brielle, New Jersey.

== Batten, Barton, Durstine, and Osborn ==
When Brower first applied for a copywriter position in George Batten Company he was not hired. He waited another 18 months before applying again, when he was interviewed and hired by William Benton. Benton, who later cofounded the Benton and Bowles agency, was fired from the company before Brower could start and didn't leave any written notice of hiring Brower. However, after showing up for work every day for three weeks he officially joined the advertising firm of George Batten Co., in 1928, just before its merger with Barton, Durstine & Osborn. of Batten. The first advertisement he wrote at the agency was for Paniplus, a hygroscopic agent which drew moisture from the air and was used by industrial bakers to keep bread moist. His headline read "Cut Losses from Stales".

He served at Batton, Barton, Durstine, and Osborn (BBDO) for 44 years until his retirement in 1972, and rose to become the chairman of the board, CEO, and president in 1957.

He was described as "Madison Avenue's favorite phrasemaker" and was also known for his advertising approach of "smart" sell. As he said: "there is no such thing as the hard sell or the soft sell. There is only the smart sell and the stupid sell."

== Rutgers ==
Brower was closely involved in future and development of Rutgers University. For many years he served as class correspondent for Rutgers magazine. Being the alumni trustee since 1946, he became instrumental in reorganizing Rutgers into a State University, and chaired the committee for that purpose in 1955. For 12 years since 1956 he served as one of trustee members of Board of Governors of the college in various positions, including vice chairman and chairman. He worked to establishing Charles and Elizabeth Brower Rare Book Fund, chairing and working on other organizations such as the Friends of the Rutgers Libraries.

== Legacy and awards ==
In 1981 Charles Brower was inducted into the American Advertising Federation (AAF) Hall of Fame.

In 1983 he received the Rutgers Medal and the Rutgers Alumni Association's Loyal Son award.

The College Avenue complex, Brower Commons, is named in his honor.

== Bibliography ==
- Me and Other Advertising Geniuses (Book, Garden City, New York, Doubleday, 1974)
- The Return of the Square (Speech, Delivered before the Illinois State Chamber of Commerce, Chicago, October 4, 1962)
- "Love on Madison Avenue" (Article, Harper's magazine)
