= Srully Blotnick =

American author and journalist

- Born: May 22, 1941 (age 85)
- Died: December 18, 2004 (aged 63)
- Education: Rensselaer Polytechnic Institute; University of California, Berkeley; Princeton University
- Occupations: Writer and journalist
- Children: Gregory J. Blotnick

Srully Blotnick (May 22, 1941 – December 18, 2004) was an American author and journalist. Notable books include Getting Rich Your Own Way, Computers Made Ridiculously Easy, The Corporate Steeplechase: Predictable Crises in a Business Career, Otherwise Engaged: The Private Lives of Successful Career Women, and Ambitious Men: Their Drives, Dreams and Delusions.

As of 1987, his best-known books — The Corporate Steeplechase: Predictable Crises in a Business Career, Otherwise Engaged: The Private Lives of Successful Career Women, and Ambitious Men: Their Drives, Dreams and Delusions — had sold more than 100,000 copies, according to the publishers.

== Education ==
An expert swimmer, Blotnick first attended the University of Miami, but he later transferred to Rensselaer Polytechnic Institute for math. After receiving his BS degree, he attended the University of California, Berkeley, and then Princeton University, where he received his MA in math and physics, with honors. His interest in mathematical models in sociology took him to Columbia University where a survey was being conducted, funded by the National Science Foundation and he joined a team of researchers. The head of the project died suddenly and the team was left leaderless, unfunded, so Blotnick joined a Wall Street firm for the next seven years as a research analyst, but his interest in the study continued and he began to write books on the topics. He later became a business psychology columnist for Forbes magazine and began writing social science books.

== Research ==
His research methodology was challenged in a report in The New York Daily News by Dan Collins which stated, “It’s clear to me that (the study upon which Blotnick’s work is purported to be based) couldn’t have been done.” Blotnick responded that when he wrote that he had conducted annual interviews with 9,000 people, he had conducted 900 “family interviews,” in which he would ask a family member, say the husband, about the work and love life of all members of his family, his wife, children and parents. This was done in order “To cut the cost to approximately 10%,” stated Blotnick.

Blotnick was then admitted in 1989 as a graduate student to the cell biology program at Harvard Medical School, the oldest graduate student ever accepted, and received his PhD in cell biology in 1994. While there he published several peer-reviewed contributions to the biomedical field, and subsequently was a post-doctoral fellow.

== Later life ==
Blotnick died of pulmonary fibrosis in 2004, in Cambridge, Massachusetts.
