= Dave Cummings (entrepreneur) =

Owner and founder of Tradebot and BATS Global Markets

- Education: Purdue University
- Occupations: Founder & CEO, Tradebot, Founder, BATS Global Markets

Dave Cummings is an American entrepreneur and CEO of the high-frequency trading firm Tradebot, founded in 1999. He also is the founder of the BATS Global Markets stock exchange. He graduated from Purdue University and previously worked for Cerner before founding his own companies.
