= ChangeGroup =

UK foreign exchange company

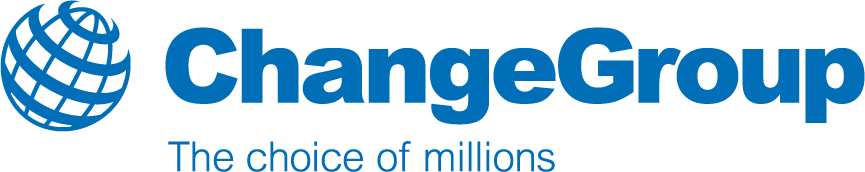
- Type: Private
- Industry: Foreign Exchange
- Founded: 1992
- Headquarters: London, United Kingdom
- Key people: Sacha Zackariya, CEO
- Number of employees: 600
- Parent: Prosegur Cash, S.A.
- Website: uk.changegroup.com

ChangeGroup is a private firm headquartered in the United Kingdom specializing in currency exchange and other financial services. In 2022 it ran more than 100 bureaux de change in airports, seaports and city centres, and 300 ATMs in 37 cities, as well as an online currency exchange service. In 2014 it rolled out dynamic currency conversion (DCC) enabled and foreign currency dispensing ATMs.

== History ==
ChangeGroup was started by Zackariya-Marikar with Bette Zackariya and Sacha Zackariya in 1992 from a bureau in London Regent Street. Sacha Zackariya, Zackariya-Marikar's son, later took over as CEO. The company was originally funded by private equity from 3i Plc, but their stake was bought out in 2005.

In 2002, the company acquired the Estonian Monex network from Hansa Bank.

The Group was given the Queens Award for Enterprise in 2006. The profit for the year, after taxation, amounted to £1,988,000 (2016: restated £1,347,000).

In 2022, the Change Group was acquired by the Spanish cash services company Prosegur Cash SA. Prosegur Cash announced the takeover on October 10, 2022, and did not disclose the price. It called ChangeGroup the world's third-largest retail foreign exchange operator. In March 2024 the business, trading as Prosegur Change, won a contract for three branches at Harry Reid International Airport in Las Vegas, its first US airport operation. On June 17, 2026, it opened five outlets in the new Terminal 3 of Frankfurt Airport, offering more than 45 currencies, tax refund processing and money transfer.

In April 2023, Kogan Page published a book “Leading Travel and Tourism Retail”, written by Sacha Alexander Zackariya about his experiences as CEO of ChangeGroup, with interviews from 40 travel and tourism leaders including prime ministers and CEOs of WTTC, Gatwick Airport, LVMH, Harrods and CHANEL.

Today, the Change Group serves approximately 5 million customers annually across Europe, the USA, and Australia, with employees of more than 80 nationalities. The company has concluded over 18 M&A transactions over the last 25 years.

== Reviews ==
A report by the Sunday Times found that ChangeGroup offered the best online exchange rates on euros in a particular week of July 2011.
