= Numerai =

San Francisco hedge fund

Numerai is an AI-run, crowd-sourced hedge fund based in San Francisco. It was founded by South African technologist Richard Craib in October 2015.

Numerai’s trades are determined by an AI, which is fueled by a network of thousands of anonymous data scientists. The provided time-series data is also cleaned and regularized, which comprises millions of samples and 1191 features that has evolved since their inception. The task is to predict the probability of a given sample yielding positive returns.

Numerai's investors include Paul Tudor Jones, Naval Ravikant, and Howard Morgan of Renaissance Technologies.

In terms of performance, Numerai's hedge fund has achieved positive returns since its inception. According to most recent Bloomberg report, Numerai had received $100 million in inflows in 2022 and returned 20% to investors despite a market downturn that saw the value of several cryptocurrencies erode by more than 90%.
