= Brielle School District =

School district in Monmouth County, New Jersey, US

Address
- 605 Union Lane Brielle, Monmouth County, New Jersey, 08730; United States
- Coordinates: 40.112529°N 74.057154°W

District information
- Grades: PreK to 8
- Superintendent: Stacie Poelstra
- Business administrator: Diane Quigley
- Schools: 1

Students and staff
- Enrollment: 484 (as of 2023–24)
- Faculty: 55.6 FTEs
- Student–teacher ratio: 8.7:1

Other information
- District Factor Group: GH
- Website: www.brielleschool.org
| Ind. | Per pupil | District spending | Rank (*) | K-8 average | %± vs. average |
|---|---|---|---|---|---|
| 1A | Total Spending | $16,142 | 13 | $18,891 | −14.6% |
| 1 | Budgetary Cost | 13,512 | 23 | 14,159 | −4.6% |
| 2 | Classroom Instruction | 7,672 | 11 | 8,659 | −11.4% |
| 6 | Support Services | 2,462 | 41 | 2,167 | 13.6% |
| 8 | Administrative Cost | 1,415 | 14 | 1,547 | −8.5% |
| 10 | Operations & Maintenance | 1,754 | 45 | 1,612 | 8.8% |
| 13 | Extracurricular Activities | 173 | 43 | 104 | 66.3% |
| 16 | Median Teacher Salary | 57,250 | 20 | 61,136 |
Data from NJDoE 2014 Taxpayers' Guide to Education Spending. *Of K-8 districts with 401-750 students. Lowest spending=1; Highest=64

The Brielle School District is a community public school district that serves students in pre-kindergarten through eighth grade from Brielle, in Monmouth County, in the U.S. state of New Jersey.

As of the 2023–24 school year, the district, comprised of one school, had an enrollment of 484 students and 55.6 classroom teachers (on an FTE basis), for a student–teacher ratio of 8.7:1.

The district had been classified by the New Jersey Department of Education as being in District Factor Group "GH", the third-highest of eight groupings. District Factor Groups organize districts statewide to allow comparison by common socioeconomic characteristics of the local districts. From lowest socioeconomic status to highest, the categories are A, B, CD, DE, FG, GH, I and J.

For ninth through twelfth grades, public school students attend Manasquan High School in Manasquan, as part of a sending/receiving relationship with the Manasquan Public Schools, joining students from Avon-by-the-Sea, Belmar, Lake Como, Sea Girt, Spring Lake and Spring Lake Heights at the school. As of the 2023–24 school year, the high school had an enrollment of 945 students and 81.2 classroom teachers (on an FTE basis), for a student–teacher ratio of 11.6:1.

== School ==
Brielle Elementary School serves students in grades PreK-8 and had an enrollment of 478 students in the 2023–24 school year.

- Stacie Poelstra, principal

== Administration ==
Core members of the district's administration are:

- Stacie Poelstra, superintendent
- Diane Quigley, business administrator and board secretary

== Board of education ==
The district's board of education is comprised of nine members who set policy and oversee the fiscal and educational operation of the district through its administration. As a Type II school district, the board's trustees are elected directly by voters to serve three-year terms of office on a staggered basis, with three seats up for election each year held (since 2012) as part of the November general election. The board appoints a superintendent to oversee the district's day-to-day operations and a business administrator to supervise the business functions of the district.
