= Tradebot =

US high-frequency trading firm

Tradebot Systems, Inc.
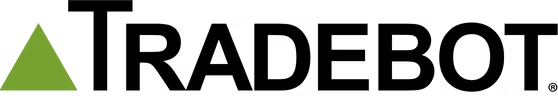
- Company type: S Corporation
- Industry: algorithmic trader
- Founded: 1999
- Headquarters: Kansas City, Missouri, U.S.
- Key people: Dave Cummings – Founder, CEO
- Number of employees: 40
- Website: www.tradebot.com

Tradebot Systems, Inc. is a high-frequency equity trading firm in the US. Based in Kansas City, Missouri, they regularly account for 5% of the total trading volume in the US stock market. According to the founder, Dave Cummings, as of 2008, the firm "typically held stocks for 11 seconds", and "had not had a losing day in 4 years". That streak continued uninterrupted until 2017.

== History ==
The firm was founded in 1999 and had an early relationship with fellow high-frequency trading shop Getco.

In 2005 Cummings left Tradebot to start a new electronic market, which he called the Better Alternative Trading System. That market eventually became the BATS Exchange.

In 2007 Cummings left BATS to return to Tradebot. The firm is affiliated with Tradebot Ventures, Tradebot Properties, Tatora and Auxby.

In summer 2014, New York attorney general Eric Schneiderman accused Barclays of hiding that Tradebot was one of the largest participants in their dark pool. Tradebot was not accused of any wrongdoing.

The Wall Street Journal reported that the firm had a nearly 14-year streak of profitable trading every day, that ended in 2017. Today, the firm exclusively trades in US stocks, having shuttered its only international effort, in Canadian stocks in 2016.

== See also ==
- BATS Exchange
