= BATS Global Markets =

Global stock exchange operator

BATS Global Markets, Inc
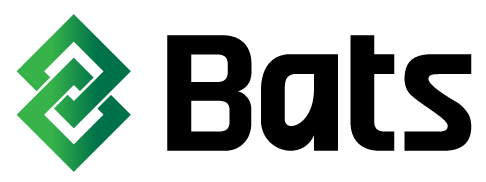
- Type: Stock exchange subsidiary
- Founded: June 2005
- Owner: Cboe Global Markets
- Key people: President and CEO: Chris Concannon; Chairman: Paul Atkins
- Currency: United States dollar
- Volume: 1B shares (Jan 2009)
- Indices: BATS (withdrawn)
- Website: www.cboe.com

BATS Global Markets is a global stock exchange operator founded in Lenexa, Kansas, with additional offices in London, New York, Chicago, and Singapore. BATS was founded in June 2005, became a licensed U.S. stock exchange operator in 2008, and launched a pan-European market that October. As of February 2016, it operated four U.S. stock exchanges, two U.S. equity options exchanges, the pan-European stock market, and a global market for the trading of foreign exchange products. BATS was acquired by Cboe Global Markets in 2017.

== History ==
The company was founded in June 2005 by Dave Cummings, a computer programmer. The name 'BATS' was originally an acronym for "Better Alternative Trading System". Cummings was inspired to start the company after observing Archipelago Holdings be acquired by the New York Stock Exchange and Instinet be acquired by NASDAQ within a week of each other in 2005. Cummings promoted BATS by emailing companies about the potential to trade outside the dominant exchanges. His vision was for BATS to be "a neutral, private, broker-dealer owned, semi-profitable utility" with no single party owning more than 20 percent. He argued that the New York Stock Exchange and NASDAQ's consolidations reduced competition and they raised prices. BATS aimed to charge less and attract listings by offering free options to companies with sufficient daily trading volume.

Cummings stepped down in 2007 and was replaced by Joe Ratterman who had been associated with the company from the start. Cummings said in his resignation, "As BATS prepares to become an exchange, my ownership of a broker-dealer precludes me from serving in management". Cummings returned to his position as CEO at Tradebot.

=== European expansion ===
Under the leadership of Ratterman, in March 2008, BATS entered the European equities markets by establishing a multilateral trading facility (MTF) to compete on a pan-European basis against the incumbent securities exchanges. BATS Europe was formally launched in October 2008.

In February 2011, BATS Global Markets agreed to buy Chi-X Europe, a competitor and largest pan-European MTF at the time, for $300 million. The deal was referred by the Office of Fair Trading to the Competition Commission in June 2011 for further investigation to "determine whether a substantial lessening of competition is probable as a result of the anticipated merger". However, the Competition Commission approved the transaction in late November 2011, leading to BATS closing the deal on 30 November 2011. In April 2011, BATS Global Markets confirmed that Mark Hemsley, CEO of BATS Europe, would be appointed CEO of the combined entity following BATS's acquisition of Chi-X Europe. By April 2012 the technology integration between the two platforms was complete and Chi-X Europe customers were migrated onto the BATS Europe platform.

=== Initial public offering ===
Also under the leadership of Ratterman, the company attempted to go public on March 23, 2012, as the first listing on its own exchange, but later withdrew the IPO the same day due to a disastrous glitch in the company's trading systems. The glitch resulted in BATS's stock price falling from the original $16 offering price to as low as $0.04 a share. Three erroneous Apple trades on the BATS exchange triggered a circuit breaker which temporarily halted trading in that stock. Those trades were later canceled. BATS halted stocks on its exchange that were affected by the glitch and included stocks with ticker symbols beginning with letters A to BFZZZ. It later reopened trading in the affected symbols but decided to withdraw the BATS stock offering.

Following the failed IPO, the BATS board of directors decided to separate the roles of chairman and CEO. Ratterman had previously held both roles but received the "unanimous support" of the directors to retain the positions of CEO and president. In July 2012, BATS named Paul Atkins, a former U.S. Securities and Exchange commissioner, to the role of non-executive chairman of its board of directors. In 2015 as the company planned to restart the initial public offering, Paul Atkins stepped down from the Chairman role. Joe Ratterman stepped into the Chairman role again as Chris Concannon assumed the day to day operations as CEO and president. The second attempt at the initial public offering was successful.

=== System issue ===
In January 2013, BATS admitted that what it called a "system issue" had generated problems with more than 400,000 trades, going back as far as 2008. Specifically, it admitted that prices had been executed that were "equal to or less than the so-called national best bid and offer price", in violation of Reg NMS.

=== Merger with Direct Edge ===
In August 2013, BATS and Direct Edge agreed to merge.

=== Acquisition by CBOE ===
In September 2016, it was announced that BATS was to be acquired in early 2017 by CBOE Holdings, which would pay about $3.2 billion for it. The transaction closed on March 1, 2017.

Following the acquisition by CBOE, BATS' trading infrastructure became the foundational technology for CBOE's global platform.

== Operations ==
=== United States ===
In the United States BATS operated two stock exchanges, the BZX Exchange and the BYX Exchange (The BATS Exchanges), which in 2012 accounted for about 10-12% of all U.S. equity trading on a daily basis. BZX and BYX are different chiefly because of their pricing structure and the BZX is almost four times bigger than the BYX. At that time, BATS was the third largest stock exchange operator in the United States.

In November 2008, BATS converted its ECN to a national securities exchange, BZX, which allowed BATS to participate in and earn market data fees from the United States consolidated tape plans, reduce its clearing costs, and operate a primary listings business. In February 2010, BATS expanded into a new asset class by offering trading of listed equity options on BZX. In October 2010, BATS launched BYX, a second national securities exchange for trading listed cash equity securities. BATS launched a primary listings business in the United States on its BZX Exchange in December 2010 and launched its first listings of seven ETFs in January 2012.

With BYX, BATS offered a different pricing model than its larger market, BZX.

=== Europe ===
BATS entered the European equities markets in 2008, with the launch of BATS Europe, a pan-European multilateral trading facility (MTF). In 2011 it acquired Chi-X Europe, a competitor and largest pan-European MTF at the time, this was merged with BATS Europe.

== Notable officers ==
Eric Swanson was Senior Vice President, General Counsel, and Secretary. He joined as General Counsel in January 2008.

In 2014, company president William O'Brien disputed assertions in the book Flash Boys: A Wall Street Revolt. He was quoted in The New York Times as saying about the book's author, "Michael Lewis clearly has a blind side, as we've just discovered". O'Brien was "referring to a previous work by the journalist", the paper reported. O'Brien and Lewis engaged in a "heated debate" on a live CNBC broadcast relating to high-frequency trading, in the first days of the book's release and after an appearance by Lewis on 60 Minutes.

Six months after the company's merger with Direct Edge, O'Brien stepped down as president of the company, and was replaced by CEO Joe Ratterman, who resumed the position of dual CEO/president, after previously holding the position from 2007 to 2014.

== See also ==
- Direct Edge
- List of stock exchanges
- List of stock exchanges in the Americas
- List of stock exchange mergers in the Americas
