= Bill Lupien =

American businessman (1941–2021)

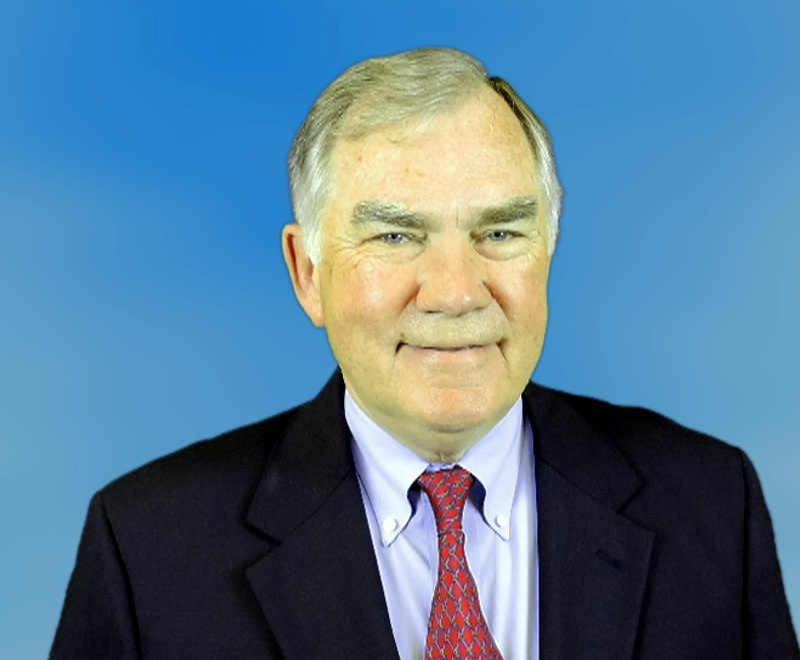

William A. Lupien (October 6, 1941 – April 15, 2021) was an American business executive in the financial industry. He traded actively in the financial markets throughout his career. He was a Specialist and later Exchange Governor on the Pacific Stock Exchange (PSE), a Nasdaq market maker, the chairman and CEO of Instinet, the chairman and CEO of OptiMark Corporation, and the managing director of the general partner of a hedge fund, Kudu Partners LP. He helped develop the world's first electronic trading system. He also served on the advisory committee on the National Market System. In 1999 he was featured in a CNBC television series as one of five people who had changed the course of the securities industry in the 20th century.

== Early life ==
Lupien was born in Chicago, IL. He lived in the Chicago area until age 16, when his family moved to Pasadena, CA. He graduated from John Muir High School in 1959. He then attended Pasadena City College until 1962, while working full-time in a variety of jobs. Following that, he attended San Diego State University, where he graduated in 1965 with dual Bachelor of Science degrees in finance and marketing.

== Early work experience ==
Lupien began his financial career working for Corporate Securities, Inc. in Arcadia, California, a brokerage firm. In June 1965, he became a clerk for Edward Calin, a specialist on the PSE. He was drafted into US Army in September 1966, and underwent basic training at Ft. Ord. Following this, he was assigned to Sharpe Army Depot, Stockton, California, as a clerk typist. While there he taught classes on investing and the securities industry to officers at the base. He was honorably discharged in September 1968, whereupon he returned to the PSE.

== Career in finance ==
Lupien became a specialist on the Pacific Exchange in 1968; his specialist post at one point had trading responsibility for 55 stocks.

Lupien was instrumental in developing the first electronic trading system in the world (SCOREX) on the PSE, which went live in 1969 in the face of substantial opposition both from members of the PSE and other Exchanges including the NYSE. Lupien executed the first-ever electronic stock trade in history using this system.

During his tenure at the PSE, Lupien also worked for the brokerage firm Mitchum, Jones & Templeton (MJT), becoming vice president in 1969, First Vice President in 1971. Lupien became President of MJT in 1974.

He was a member of the PSE Floor Trading Committee, which adjudicated minor disputes on the exchange floor. He became a governor of the PSE in 1975 and served two three-year terms, while also serving as a floor governor, mediating more serious exchange floor disputes and also issuing trading halts.

From 1976-78, Lupien was one of several people working on the design of the Intermarket Trading System (ITS). He developed much of its rules of operation and higher-level technical specifications. He also helped found the Pacific Options Exchange in San Francisco in 1976.

Lupien left MJT in 1980 to found Trading Company of the West with Tony Forstmann, but continued as a specialist on the PSE until January 1983. He then moved to New York City as president of Institutional Networks Corp. (later renamed Instinet). He was named chairman and CEO later that year, and was reunited with Joe Taussig, a former MJT colleague, who became COO. Instinet, the first electronic trading system for institutional investors and wholesale brokers, increased its trading volume substantially during his tenure, and Lupien retained his position for a short time after Reuters acquired the company in 1987. During this time he introduced electronic trading to a number of exchanges around the world. Instinet was the subject of two Harvard Business School case studies.

Lupien moved to Los Angeles in 1988 and restarted MJT as an institutional broker and Nasdaq market-maker. Acting as chairman and CEO, Lupien moved MJT to Durango, Colorado, in 1993 in order to pursue his interest in ranching. Shortly thereafter, MJT began to develop electronic order management and execution systems. Later, MJT developed and marketed a suite of institutional trading software known as TOMCAT.

Terry Rickard joined MJT in June 1994, and he and Lupien jointly designed and developed the OptiMark trading system. This system was spun out into a separate corporation, OptiMark Corporation, of which Lupien was chairman and CEO. until 2001.

OptiMark raised about $350 million in venture capital in the late 1990s to build and operate its transaction system as a facility of multiple exchanges, including the PSE, Nasdaq and the Osaka Securities Exchange in Japan. OptiMark’s design enabled complex orders of arbitrary sizes and strategies to be entered into the market anonymously. OptiMark was issued several patents on its trading technology, and its upcoming release received a lot of journalistic attention. However, it met with substantial opposition from several industry segments and failed to raise enough funds to become a viable market. OptiMark was the subject of a Harvard Business School case study. OptiMark also developed and patented an electronic approach for the opening and intraday trading in options exchanges.

From 2001-2005, Lupien traded his own account and managed money for friends and family. He also co-authored (with David Nassar) the book Market Evaluation and Analysis for Swing Trading, and taught an electronic trading course. In Jan. 2005, he started Kudu Partners LP, a hedge fund managed by La Plata River Partners, LLC, for which he was the General Manager. Again, he was rejoined by Joe Taussig to create Resource Re, a reinsurer where Kudu managed the assets and in April 2014, he merged Kudu Partners with the reinsurer to form Till Capital Ltd. (TSX.V: TIL), a Canadian-listed public company, where he served as Chief Investment Officer until his death.

== Other work ==
Lupien was a member of the Young Presidents' Organization from 1979 to 1992. He was a board member of a number of private and public companies, and served on a number of philanthropic boards, including YMCA, Union Rescue Mission (Los Angeles), and Ft. Lewis College Professional Associates. He was a guest lecturer in the business schools of several universities, including Harvard, Wharton, NYU, University of Chicago, Cornell, USC, San Diego State University, and Ft. Lewis College.

== Selected publications ==
- Rickard, John T. and William A. Lupien, “Evaluation of mining projects using novel computational intelligence technology,” Proc. Automining 2012 Conference, Viña del Mar, Chile, 2012.
- Nassar, David and William A. Lupien, Market Evaluation and Analysis for Swing Trading, New York, NY: McGraw-Hill, 2004.
- Rickard, John T. and William A. Lupien, “Optimum Strategies for Opening Trading in Options,” Proceedings, Thirtieth Asilomar Conference on Signals, Systems and Computers, pp. 451–458, November 1996.
- Rickard, John T. and William A. Lupien, “Optimal Market Structures Based Upon Mutual Satisfaction,” Proceedings, Thirtieth Asilomar Conference on Signals, Systems and Computers, pp. 446–450, November 1996.
- Rickard, John T. and William A. Lupien, “Optimal Execution of Portfolio Trades,” Proceedings, Thirty First Asilomar Conference on Signals, Systems and Computers, November 1997.
