= Foreign currency mortgage =

Type of mortgage loan

A foreign currency mortgage is a type of mortgage loan that is repayable in a currency other than the currency of the country in which the borrower is a resident. These mortgages are used for both personal and corporate financing.

The interest rate on a foreign currency mortgage is based on the rates applicable to the currency in which the loan is denominated, not the borrower’s domestic currency. Such mortgages may be attractive when interest rates on the foreign currency are significantly lower than those available for loans in the borrower's own currency.

However, foreign currency mortgages expose the borrower to exchange rate fluctuations. If the borrower's domestic currency strengthens relative to the loan currency, the borrower can repay the mortgage at a lower cost, effectively achieving a capital saving. Conversely, if the domestic currency weakens against the foreign currency, the cost of repayment increases, resulting in a capital loss.

== Swiss franc loans ==
In several European countries, particularly in Central and Eastern Europe, foreign currency mortgages denominated in Swiss francs (CHF) became widespread during the early 2000s due to lower interest rates in Switzerland. However, after the Swiss National Bank removed its currency floor in 2015 and the franc appreciated sharply, many borrowers experienced a significant increase in repayment obligations. This triggered widespread litigation and regulatory responses.

The European Court of Justice has issued multiple rulings on the legality of contract terms used in Swiss franc loans, especially regarding insufficient information on exchange rate risks and unfair indexing mechanisms. Some national governments, such as those of Hungary and Greece, implemented conversion schemes to mitigate borrower losses, while courts in Poland, France, and other countries have ruled on the validity of such contracts based on EU consumer protection law.

== See also ==
- Hedge (finance)
- Exchange rate
- Foreign exchange market
- Wire transfer
- List of countries by foreign-exchange reserves
