= Instinet =

U.S. financial services company

Instinet Incorporated
- Logo since 2012
- Type: Subsidiary
- Industry: Brokerage
- Founded: 1969; 57 years ago
- Founders: Jerome M. Pustilnik; Herbert R. Behrens
- Headquarters: 309 W 49th Street, Manhattan, New York City, New York, U.S.
- Area served: Worldwide
- Key people: Ralston Roberts (Chief Executive Officer); Laure Richmond (Chief Financial Officer); Minor Huffman (Chief Technology Officer); Faron Webb (General Counsel); Richard Parsons (CEO, Instinet Europe Limited); Stuart Knowling (CEO, Instinet Asia-Pacific)
- Parent: Nomura Holdings
- Website: instinet.com

Instinet Incorporated is an institutional, agency-model broker that also serves as the independent equity trading arm of its parent, Nomura Group. It executes trades for asset management firms, hedge funds, insurance companies, mutual funds and pension funds. Headquartered in New York City, the company provides sales trading services and trading technologies such as the Newport EMS, algorithms, trade cost analytics, commission management, independent research and dark pools.

However, Instinet is best known for being the first off-exchange trading alternatives, with its "green screen" terminals prevalent in the 1980s and 1990s, and as the founder of electronic communication networks, Chi-X Europe and Chi-X Global.

According to industry research group Markit, in 2015 Instinet was the 3rd-largest cash equities broker in Europe.

== History ==
=== Early history ===
Instinet was founded by Jerome M. Pustilnik and Herbert R. Behrens and was incorporated in 1969 as Institutional Networks Corp. The founders aimed to compete with the New York Stock Exchange by means of computer links between major institutions, such as banks, mutual funds, and insurance companies, with no delays or intervening specialists. Through the Instinet system, which went live in December 1969, the company provided computer services and a communications network for the automated buying and selling of equity securities on an anonymous, confidential basis.

Uptake of the platform was slow through the 1970s, and in 1983 Instinet turned to William A. "Bill" Lupien, a former Pacific Stock Exchange specialist, to run the company. Bill Lupien decided to market the system more aggressively to the broker community, rather than focus exclusively on the buyside as his predecessors had. To expand its market, Lupien brought on board Fredric W. Rittereiser, formerly of Troster Singer and the Sherwood Group, as president and Chief Operating Officer and David N. Rosensaft as Vice President (later SVP) of New Products Development. Rittereiser later departed to become CEO of First Jersey and was replaced by Joseph Taussig as COO. Together, they successfully introduced many innovations which made Instinet an integral tool for traders on both the "buy" and "sell" sides of the market and volumes grew from 11 million shares the year before they took it over, to 11 million share days (250 X growth in 3 1/2 years).

=== Reuters acquisition ===
Logo of Instinet under ownership of Reuters

As a result of Lupien's refocusing of Instinet (which the business was renamed in 1985), the firm grew rapidly in the mid-1980s. During the Crash of 1987 electronic trading system allowed trading when brokers and market makers were unwilling to answer their phones during the free-fall. Reuters, which in 1985 had acquired a portion of the firm, acquired the entire business in May 1987, though under the deal Instinet would remain an independent, New York-based subsidiary. Lupien and then COO Joseph Taussig would resign shortly thereafter.

=== Alternative Trading Systems regulations ===
Under Reuters, the Instinet platform continued to grow through the late 1980s and into the early 1990s. By the time that the U.S. Securities and Exchange Commission introduced the Order Handling Rules and alternative trading systems (ATS) regulation in the late 1990s. In 1992, Instinet expanded internationally. Douglas Atkin led the effort and by 1998 Instinet was operating in over 20 world markets and had grown revenues to approximately $100 million. Instinet was the dominant electronic communication network. However, these rules also gave rise to new competitors, some of whom employed new pricing schemes. By the early 2000s, these competitors, helped by missteps at Instinet that included rapid expansion, over-spending and slow uptake of technology, had managed to erode the firm's market share. As a result, Instinet in 2002 merged with the Island ECN, renaming the Island technology platform Inet.

=== Public listing ===
Reuters went on to IPO Instinet in 2001 keeping a 62% ownership stake. It would hold this until the 2005 acquisition of Instinet by NASDAQ in 2005, in which Nasdaq retained the INET ECN and subsequently sold the agency brokerage business to Silver Lake Partners.

=== Nomura acquisition ===
In February 2007, Nomura purchased the firm from Silver Lake for a reported $1.2 billion. Instinet is today operated as an independent subsidiary of Nomura and run by CEO Ralston Roberts. In December 2009, in commemoration of its 40th anniversary, Instinet worked with the Make-a-Wish Foundation to grant wishes to 40 children with life-threatening illnesses. In May 2012, Nomura announced that it would transfer electronic trading in the United States to Instinet, with the goal of eventually making it the electronic trading arm for all of Nomura. However, in September 2012, Nomura announced that it would instead make Instinet its execution services (cash, program and electronic trading) arm in all markets globally excluding Japan.

== Achievements ==
Instinet is credited with several firsts in electronic trading. In addition to launching one of the first electronic trading platforms in 1969, Instinet developed:

- 1980: First direct market access system
- 1986: First point-in-time crossing system in the US
- 1993: Instinet OMS, one of the first modern execution management system (EMS) platforms
- 1999: Instinet Helix, one of the first market routing platforms
- 2007: Chi-X Europe, the first and largest European multilateral trading facility, which in 2011 was acquired by BATS Global Markets
- 2008: Chi-X Global, operator of Chi-X Australia, Chi-X Canada and Chi-X Japan; in 2015, Nasdaq announced acquisition of Chi-X Canada from Chi-X Global; in 2016 Chi-X Australia, Chi-X Japan and Chi-Tech was acquired by J.C. Flowers.
- 2017: Instinet announces acquisition of Blockcross, State Street's US-equity dark pool.
