= Small Order Execution System =

Electronic trading system on Nasdaq

The Small-Order Execution System (SOES) was a system to facilitate clearing trades of low volume on Nasdaq. It has been phased out and is no longer necessary.

== History ==
SOES was first introduced in December 1984 for 25 stocks to provide automatic order execution for individual traders with orders less than or equal to 1000 shares. The lack of liquidity after the 1987 market crash led Nasdaq to enforce mandatory use of the SOES by all market makers using the NASDAQ National Market System, providing excellent liquidity for smaller investors and traders.

Initially, when SOES was mandatory, it was met with heavy pessimism from Nasdaq member firms because it forced them to execute all SOES trades that met the market maker's advertised price. There were also significant limitations implemented to prevent day traders from exploiting the system and taking advantage of old prices quoted by market makers.

SOES operated alongside another electronic system called SelectNet, launched in 1988, which enabled market participants to negotiate via computer instead of telephone and permitted larger orders than SOES.

Although SOES was intended for use by retail investors, by 1995 more than 80% of its users were day traders, who used the system because its automatic execution gave them a trading advantage, although licensed broker-dealers were prohibited by Nasdaq rules from using SOES to trade for themselves. Since much trading on Nasdaq was still done by human market makers, day traders (derisively nicknamed "SOES bandits") could exploit slower human reaction times to profit from scalping outdated price quotes when the price for a stock shifted.

SOES's share of total Nasdaq trading volume was 5% in 1998. In July 2001, Nasdaq rolled out an upgrade to SOES, dubbed "SuperSOES", that raised the cap on trades in a single transaction from 999 to 999,999.

== Rules ==
There were several restrictions for those who used SOES, rather than a traditional electronic communication network (ECN), to place their orders.

- Trades could not be in excess of 1000 shares for a particular stock.
- SOES did not allow trades in stocks that were trading at prices greater than $250 per share.
- Once a trader received an execution through SOES, they had to wait 10 minutes to place a trade on the same side of the market in the same stock.
- Institutions and stockbrokers were not allowed to place orders for their own accounts through SOES, but they could for a client's account.
- Market makers had to honor their advertised bid/ask prices to SOES orders, provided that they were for the amount that the market maker was seeking.

== Effect ==
SOES revamped the trading market for individual investors. It gave small investors and traders the opportunity to compete on a level playing field with larger investors, such as institutions, for access to orders and execution.

== See also ==
- Advanced Computerized Execution System
- Exchange-traded derivative contract
