= Electronic communication network =

Network for trading financial products

An electronic communication network (ECN) is a type of computerized forum or network that facilitates the trading of financial products outside traditional stock exchanges. An ECN is generally an electronic system accessed by an electronic trading platform that widely disseminates orders entered by market makers to third parties and permits the orders to be executed against them in whole or in part. The primary products that are traded on ECNs are stocks and currencies. ECNs are generally passive computer-driven networks that internally match limit orders and charge a very small per share transaction fee (often a fraction of a cent per share).

The first ECN, Instinet, was created in 1969. ECNs increase competition among trading firms by lowering transaction costs, giving clients full access to their order books, and offering order matching outside traditional exchange hours. ECNs are sometimes also referred to as alternative trading systems or alternative trading networks.

== History ==
The term ECN was first used in the 1970s by the U.S. Securities and Exchange Commission (SEC) to define, "any electronic system that widely disseminates to third parties orders entered therein by an exchange market maker or OTC market maker, and permits such orders to be executed against it in whole or in part". The first ECN, the Instinet, was released in 1969 and provided an early application of the advances in computing. The spread of ECNs was encouraged through changes in regulatory law set forth by the SEC, and in 1975 the SEC adopted the Securities Acts Amendments of 1975, encouraging the "linking of all markets for qualified securities through communication and data processing facilities".

ECNs have complicated stock exchanges through their interaction with NASDAQ. One of the key developments in the history of ECNs was the NASDAQ over-the-counter quotation system. NASDAQ was created following a 1969 American Stock Exchange study which estimated that errors in the processing of handwritten securities orders cost brokerage firms approximately $100 million per year. The NASDAQ system automated such order processing and provided brokers with the latest competitive price quotes via a computer terminal. In March 1994, a study by two economists, William Christie and Paul Schultz, noted that NASDAQ bid–ask spreads were larger than was statistically likely, indicating "We are unable to envision any scenario in which 40 to 60 dealers who are competing for order flow would simultaneously and consistently avoid using odd-eighth quotes without an implicit agreement to post quotes only on the even price fractions. However, our data do not provide direct evidence of tacit collusion among NASDAQ market makers".

These results led to an antitrust lawsuit being filed against NASDAQ. As part of NASDAQ's settlement of the antitrust charges, NASDAQ adopted new order handling rules that integrated ECNs into the NASDAQ system. Shortly after this settlement, the SEC adopted Regulation ATS, which permitted ECNs the option of registering as stock exchanges or else being regulated under a separate set of standards for ECNs.

At that time major ECNs that became active were Instinet and Island (part of Instinet was spun off, merged with Island into Inet, and acquired by NASDAQ), Archipelago Exchange (which was acquired by the NYSE) and Brut (now acquired by NASDAQ).

ECNs enjoyed a resurgence after the adoption of SEC Regulation NMS, which required "trade through" protection of orders in the market, regardless of where those orders are placed.

In the past, many ECNs were "closed book"—i.e., allowing participants to interact only with other participants in that network. However, increasingly ECNs have adopted an "open book" format, addressing the potential fragmented liquidity by integrating orders with those of other ECNs or market makers, thus increasing the overall pool of orders.

== Function ==
ECNs are used as stock exchanges for off-the-floor trading. To trade with an ECN, one must be a subscriber or have an account with a broker that provides direct access trading. ECN subscribers can enter orders into the ECN via a custom computer terminal or network protocols. The ECN will then match contra-side orders (i.e. a sell-order is "contra-side" to a buy-order with the same price and share count) for execution. The ECN will post unmatched orders on the system for other subscribers to view. With ECN, buyers and sellers are able to trade anonymously, with the trade execution reports listing the ECN as the party.

ECNs allow its customers to trade outside traditional trading hours. Some ECN brokers may offer additional features to subscribers such as negotiation, reserve size, and pegging, and may have access to the entire ECN book (as opposed to the "top of the book") that real-time market data regarding depth of trading interest. ECNs are also considered to be effective for handling small orders.

ECNs are generally facilitated by electronic negotiation, a type of communication between agents that allows cooperative and competitive sharing of information to determine a proper price.

=== Negotiation types ===
The most common paradigm is the electronic auction type. As of 2005, most e-business negotiation systems can only support price negotiations. Traditional negotiations typically include discussion of other attributes of a deal, such as delivery terms or payment conditions. This one-dimensional approach is one of the reasons why electronic markets struggle for acceptance. Multiattributive and combinatorial auction mechanisms are emerging to allow further types of negotiation.

Support for complex multi-attribute negotiations is a critical success factor for the next generation of electronic markets and, more generally, for all types of electronic exchanges. This is what the second type of electronic negotiation, namely Negotiation Support, addresses. While auctions are essentially mechanisms, bargaining is often the only choice in complex cases or those cases where no choice of partners is given. Bargaining is a hard, error-prone, ambiguous task often performed under time pressure. Information technology has some potential to facilitate negotiation processes which are analyzed in research projects/prototypes such as INSPIRE, Negoisst or WebNS.

The third type of negotiation is automated argumentation, where agents exchange not only values, but also arguments for their offers/counter-offers. This requires agents to be able to reason about the mental states of other market participants.

=== Technologies ===
One research area that has paid particular attention to modeling automated negotiations is that of autonomous agents. If negotiations occur frequently, possibly on a minute per minute basis in order to schedule network capacity, or negotiation topics can be clearly defined it may be desirable to automate this coordination.

Automated negotiation is a key form of interaction in complex systems composed of autonomous agents. Negotiation is a process of making offers and counteroffers, with the aim of finding an acceptable agreement. During negotiation, each offer is based on its own utility and expectation of what other. This means that a multi-criteria decision making is need to be taken for each offer.

== In the stock market ==
For stock trading, ECNs exist as a class of SEC-permitted alternative trading systems (ATS). As an ATS, ECNs exclude broker-dealers' internal crossing networks – i.e., systems that match orders in private using prices from a public exchange.

ECNs, as alternative trading systems, have increased competition with institutional trading systems. Alternative trading systems have been found to have lower execution costs, however as new ECNs emerge, some of this cost reduction has dissipated. Simultaneously, the growth of ECNs has been found to disrupt institutional trading. An analysis of impact of ECNs on NASDAQ found "tighter spreads, greater depths, and less concentrated markets". ECNs provide historical orders and price data to subscribers. As a result, ECNs compete through their ability to attract "more informed orders" during "periods of high volume and return volatility". Professor Terrence Hendershott argues that as of 2003 "ECN's capture 40% of the volume in NASDAQ securities", and are considerably changing the securities trading market.

ECNs' transactions can be completed without broker-dealers. ECNs have influenced the stock market by eliminating dealer functions in order-matching. With the automation of orders on mass scale, the role of intermediary traders has been reconfigured. While the ECNs do not execute decision-making algorithms to the extent of algorithmic trading, nevertheless they have impacted the role of human traders in financial exchange.

== Fee structure ==
ECN's fee structure can be grouped in two basic structures: a classic structure and a credit (or rebate) structure. Both fee structures offer advantages of their own. The classic structure tends to attract liquidity removers while the credit structure appeals to liquidity providers. However, since both removers and providers of liquidity are necessary to create a market, ECNs must choose their fee structures carefully.

In a credit structure ECNs make a profit from paying liquidity providers a credit while charging a debit to liquidity removers. Credits range from $0.002 to $0.00295 per share for liquidity providers, and debits from $0.0025 to $0.003 per share for liquidity removers. The fee can be determined by the monthly volume provided and removed, or by a fixed structure, depending on the ECN. This structure is common on the NASDAQ market. NASDAQ Price List. Traders commonly quote the fees in millicents or mils (e.g. $0.00295 is 295 mils).

In a classic structure, the ECN will charge a small fee to all market participants using their network, both liquidity providers and removers. They also can attract volume to their networks by giving lower prices to large liquidity providers. Fees for ECNs that operate under a classic structure range from $0 to $0.0015, or even higher depending on each ECN. This fee structure is more common in the NYSE, however recently some ECNs have moved their NYSE operations into a credit structure.

== Currency trading ==
The first ECN for internet currency trading was New-York based Matchbook FX formed in 1999. At the time, all prices were created and supplied by Matchbook FX's traders/users, including banks, within its ECN network. This was unique at the time, as it empowered buy-side FX market participants, historically always "price takers", to also be "price makers". Today, multiple FX ECNs provide access to an electronic trading network supplied with streaming quotes. Their matching engines perform limit checks and match orders, usually in less than 100 milliseconds per order. The matching is quote driven and these are the prices that match against all orders.

Spreads are discretionary but in general multi-bank competition creates 1-2 pip spreads on USD Majors and Euro Crosses. The order book is not a routing system that sends orders to individual market makers. It is a live exchange type book working against the best bid/offer of all quotes. By trading through an ECN, a currency trader generally benefits from greater price transparency, faster processing, increased liquidity and more availability in the marketplace. Banks also reduce their costs as there is less manual effort involved in using an ECN for trading.

== See also ==
- Extended hours trading
- Inet
- Island ECN
- NASDAQ
- NYSE Arca
- Order matching system
