= 2010 flash crash =

U.S. stock market crash lasting 36 minutes on May 6, 2010

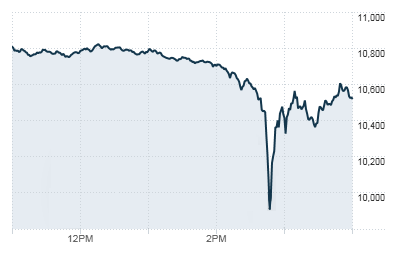
The DJIA on May 6, 2010 (11:00 AM – 4:00 PM EDT)

The flash crash of May 6, 2010, also known as the crash of 2:45 or simply the flash crash, was a United States trillion-dollar flash crash (a type of stock market crash) which started at 2:32 p.m. EDT and lasted for approximately 36 minutes.

A variety of explanations have been forwarded for the crash, including errors in automatic trading systems and deliberate market manipulation.

== Overview ==
Stock indices, such as the S&P 500, Dow Jones Industrial Average and Nasdaq Composite, collapsed and rebounded very rapidly. The Dow Jones Industrial Average had its second biggest intraday point decline (from the opening) up to that point, plunging 998.5 points (about 9%), most within minutes, only to recover a large part of the loss. It was also the second-largest intraday point swing (difference between intraday high and intraday low) up to that point, at 1,010.14 points. The prices of stocks, stock index futures, options and exchange-traded funds (ETFs) were volatile, thus trading volume spiked. A CFTC 2014 report described it as one of the most turbulent periods in the history of financial markets.

New regulations put in place following the 2010 flash crash proved to be inadequate to protect investors in the August 24, 2015 flash crash—"when the price of many ETFs appeared to come unhinged from their underlying value"—and ETFs were subsequently put under greater scrutiny by regulators and investors.

On April 21, 2015, nearly five years after the incident, the U.S. Department of Justice laid 22 criminal counts, including fraud and market manipulation, against Navinder Singh Sarao, a British financial trader. Among the charges included was the use of spoofing algorithms; just prior to the flash crash, he placed orders for thousands of E-mini S&P 500 stock index futures contracts which he planned on canceling later. These orders amounting to about "$200 million worth of bets that the market would fall" were "replaced or modified 19,000 times" before they were canceled. Spoofing, layering, and front running are now banned.

The Commodity Futures Trading Commission (CFTC) investigation concluded that Sarao "was at least significantly responsible for the order imbalances" in the derivatives market which affected stock markets and exacerbated the flash crash. Sarao began his alleged market manipulation in 2009 with commercially available trading software whose code he modified "so he could rapidly place and cancel orders automatically". Traders Magazine journalist, John Bates, argued that blaming a 36-year-old small-time trader who worked from his parents' modest stucco house in suburban west London for sparking a trillion-dollar stock market crash is "a little bit like blaming lightning for starting a fire" and that the investigation was lengthened because regulators used "bicycles to try and catch Ferraris". Furthermore, he concluded that by April 2015, traders can still manipulate and impact markets in spite of regulators and banks' new, improved monitoring of automated trade systems.

In May 2014, a CFTC report concluded that high-frequency traders "did not cause the Flash Crash, but contributed to it by demanding immediacy ahead of other market participants".

Some recent peer-reviewed research shows that flash crashes are not isolated occurrences, but have occurred quite often. Gao and Mizrach studied US equities over the period of 1993–2011. They show that breakdowns in market quality (such as flash crashes) have occurred in every year they examined and that, apart from the financial crisis, such problems have declined since the introduction of Reg NMS. They also show that 2010, while infamous for the flash crash, was not a year with an inordinate number of breakdowns in market quality.

== Background ==
On May 6, 2010, U.S. stock markets opened and the Dow was down, and trended that way for most of the day on worries about the debt crisis in Greece. At 2:42 p.m., with the Dow down more than 300 points for the day, the equity market began to fall rapidly, dropping an additional 600 points in 5 minutes for a loss of nearly 1,000 points for the day by 2:47 p.m. Twenty minutes later, by 3:07 p.m., the market had regained most of the 600-point drop. At the time of the flash crash, in May 2010, high-frequency traders were taking advantage of unintended consequences of the consolidation of the U.S. financial regulations into Regulation NMS, designed to modernize and strengthen the United States National Market System for equity securities. The Reg NMS, promulgated and described by the United States Securities and Exchange Commission, was intended to assure that investors received the best price executions for their orders by encouraging competition in the marketplace, but created attractive new opportunities for high-frequency-traders. Activities such as spoofing, layering and front running were banned by 2015. This rule was designed to give investors the best possible price when dealing in stocks, even if that price was not on the exchange that received the order.

== Explanation ==
=== Early theories ===
At first, while the regulatory agencies and the United States Congress announced investigations into the crash, no specific reason for the 600-point plunge was identified. Investigators focused on a number of possible causes, including a confluence of computer-automated trades, or possibly an error by human traders. By the first weekend, regulators had discounted the possibility of trader error and focused on automated trades conducted on exchanges other than the NYSE. However, CME Group, a large futures exchange, stated that, insofar as stock index futures traded on CME Group were concerned, its investigation found no evidence for this, or that high-frequency trading played a role, and in fact concluded that automated trading had contributed to market stability during the period of the crash. Others speculate that an intermarket sweep order may have played a role in triggering the crash.

Several plausible theories were put forward to explain the plunge.

1. The fat-finger theory: In 2010 immediately after the plunge, several reports indicated that the event may have been triggered by a fat-finger trade, an inadvertent large "sell order" for Procter & Gamble stock, inciting massive algorithmic trading orders to dump the stock; however, this theory was quickly disproved after it was determined that Procter and Gamble's decline occurred after a significant decline in the E-Mini S&P 500 futures contracts. The "fat-finger trade" hypothesis was also disproved when it was determined that existing CME Group and ICE safeguards would have prevented such an error.
2. Impact of high frequency traders: Regulators found that high frequency traders exacerbated price declines. Regulators determined that high frequency traders sold aggressively to eliminate their positions and withdrew from the markets in the face of uncertainty. A July 2011 report by the International Organization of Securities Commissions (IOSCO), an international body of securities regulators, concluded that while "algorithms and HFT technology have been used by market participants to manage their trading and risk, their usage was also clearly a contributing factor". Other theories postulate that the actions of high frequency traders (HFTs) were the underlying cause of the flash crash. One hypothesis, based on the analysis of bid–ask data by Nanex, LLC, is that HFTs send non-executable orders (orders that are outside the bid–ask spread) to exchanges in batches. Though the purpose of these orders is not publicly known, some experts speculate that their purpose is to increase noise, clog exchanges, and outwit competitors. However, other experts believe that deliberate market manipulation is unlikely because there is no practical way in which the HFTs can profit from these orders, and it is more likely that these orders are designed to test latency times and to detect early price trends. Whatever the reasons behind the existence of these orders, this theory postulates that they exacerbated the crash by overloading the exchanges on May 6. On September 3, 2010, the regulators probing the crash concluded: "that quote-stuffing—placing and then almost immediately cancelling large numbers of rapid-fire orders to buy or sell stocks—was not a 'major factor' in the turmoil". Some have put forth the theory that high-frequency trading was actually a major factor in minimizing and reversing the flash crash.
3. Large directional bets: Regulators said a large E-Mini S&P 500 seller set off a chain of events triggering the Flash Crash, but did not identify the firm. Earlier, some investigators suggested that a large purchase of put options on the S&P 500 index by the hedge fund Universa Investments shortly before the crash may have been among the primary causes. Other reports have speculated that the event may have been triggered by a single sale of 75,000 E-Mini S&P 500 contracts valued at around $4 billion by the Overland Park, Kansas, firm Waddell & Reed on the Chicago Mercantile Exchange. Others suspect a movement in the U.S. Dollar to Japanese yen exchange rate.
4. Changes in market structure: Some market structure experts speculate that, whatever the underlying causes, equity markets are vulnerable to these sorts of events because of decentralization of trading.
5. Technical glitches: An analysis of trading on the exchanges during the moments immediately prior to the flash crash reveals technical glitches in the reporting of prices on the NYSE and various alternative trading systems (ATSs) that might have contributed to the drying up of liquidity. According to this theory, technical problems at the NYSE led to delays as long as five minutes in NYSE quotes being reported on the Consolidated Quotation System (CQS) with time stamps indicating that the quotes were current. However, some market participants (those with access to NYSE's own quote reporting system, OpenBook) could see both correct current NYSE quotes, as well as the delayed but apparently current CQS quotes. At the same time, there were errors in the prices of some stocks (Apple Inc., Sothebys, and some ETFs). Confused and uncertain about prices, many market participants attempted to drop out of the market by posting stub quotes (very low bids and very high offers) and, at the same time, many high-frequency trading algorithms attempted to exit the market with market orders (which were executed at the stub quotes) leading to a domino effect that resulted in the flash crash plunge.

=== SEC/CFTC report ===
On September 30, 2010, after almost five months of investigations led by Gregg E. Berman, the U.S. Securities and Exchange Commission (SEC) and the Commodity Futures Trading Commission (CFTC) issued a joint report titled "Findings Regarding the Market Events of May 6, 2010" identifying the sequence of events leading to the flash crash.

The joint 2010 report "portrayed a market so fragmented and fragile that a single large trade could send stocks into a sudden spiral", and detailed how a large mutual fund firm selling an unusually large number of E-Mini S&P contracts first exhausted available buyers, and then how high-frequency traders (HFT) started aggressively selling, accelerating the effect of the mutual fund's selling and contributing to the sharp price declines that day.

The SEC and CFTC joint 2010 report itself says that "May 6 started as an unusually turbulent day for the markets" and that by the early afternoon "broadly negative market sentiment was already affecting an increase in the price volatility of some individual securities". At 2:32 p.m. (EDT), against a "backdrop of unusually high volatility and thinning liquidity" that day, a large fundamental trader (known to be Waddell & Reed Financial Inc.) "initiated a sell program to sell a total of 75,000 E-Mini S&P contracts (valued at approximately $4.1 billion) as a hedge to an existing equity position". The report says that this was an unusually large position and that the computer algorithm the trader used to trade the position was set to "target an execution rate set to 9% of the trading volume calculated over the previous minute, but without regard to price or time".

As the large seller's trades were executed in the futures market, buyers included high-frequency trading firms—trading firms that specialize in high-speed trading and rarely hold on to any given position for very long—and within minutes these high-frequency trading firms started trying to sell the long futures contracts they had just picked up from the mutual fund. The Wall Street Journal quoted the joint report, "'HFTs [then] began to quickly buy and then resell contracts to each other—generating a 'hot-potato' volume effect as the same positions were passed rapidly back and forth.'" The combined sales by the large seller and high-frequency firms quickly drove "the E-Mini price down 3% in just four minutes".

From the SEC/CFTC report:

The combined selling pressure from the sell algorithm, HFTs, and other traders drove the price of the E-Mini S&P 500 down approximately 3% in just four minutes from the beginning of 2:41 p.m. through the end of 2:44 p.m. During this same time cross-market arbitrageurs who did buy the E-Mini S&P 500, simultaneously sold equivalent amounts in the equities markets, driving the price of SPY (an exchange-traded fund which represents the S&P 500 index) also down approximately 3%. Still lacking sufficient demand from fundamental buyers or cross-market arbitrageurs, HFTs began to quickly buy and then resell contracts to each other—generating a "hot-potato" volume effect as the same positions were rapidly passed back and forth. Between 2:45:13 and 2:45:27, HFTs traded over 27,000 contracts, which accounted for about 49 percent of the total trading volume, while buying only about 200 additional contracts net.

As prices in the futures market fell, there was a spillover into the equities markets. The computer systems used by most high-frequency trading firms to keep track of market activity decided to pause trading, and those firms then scaled back their trading or withdrew from the markets altogether.

The New York Times then noted, "Automatic computerized traders on the stock market shut down as they detected the sharp rise in buying and selling". As computerized high-frequency traders exited the stock market, the resulting lack of liquidity "caused shares of some prominent companies like Procter & Gamble and Accenture to trade down as low as a penny or as high as $100,000". These extreme prices also resulted from "market internalizers", firms that usually trade with customer orders from their own inventory instead of sending those orders to exchanges, "routing 'most, if not all,' retail orders to the public markets—a flood of unusual selling pressure that sucked up more dwindling liquidity".

While some firms exited the market, firms that remained in the market exacerbated price declines because they "'escalated their aggressive selling' during the downdraft". High-frequency firms during the crisis, like other firms, were net sellers, contributing to the crash.

The joint report continued: "At 2:45:28 p.m., trading on the E-Mini was paused for five seconds when the Chicago Mercantile Exchange ('CME') Stop Logic Functionality was triggered in order to prevent a cascade of further price declines. In that short period of time, sell-side pressure in the E-Mini was partly alleviated and buy-side interest increased. When trading resumed at 2:45:33 p.m., prices stabilized and shortly thereafter, the E-Mini began to recover, followed by the SPY". After a short while, as market participants had "time to react and verify the integrity of their data and systems, buy-side and sell-side interest returned and an orderly price discovery process began to function", and by 3:00 p.m., most stocks "had reverted back to trading at prices reflecting true consensus values".

=== Criticism of the SEC/CFTC report ===
A few hours after the release of the 104-page SEC/CFTC 2010 report, a number of critics stated that blaming a single order (from Waddell & Reed) for triggering the event was disingenuous. Most prominent of all, the Chicago Mercantile Exchange issued, within 24 hours, a rare press release in which it argued against the SEC/CFTC explanation:

Futures and options markets are hedging and risk transfer markets. The report references a series of bona fide hedging transactions, totaling 75,000 contracts, entered into by an institutional asset manager to hedge a portion of the risk in its $75 billion investment portfolio in response to global economic events and the fundamentally deteriorating market conditions that day. The 75,000 contracts represented 1.3% of the total E-Mini S&P 500 volume of 5.7 million contracts on May 6 and less than 9% of the volume during the time period in which the orders were executed. The prevailing market sentiment was evident well before these orders were placed, and the orders, as well as the manner in which they were entered, were both legitimate and consistent with market practices. These hedging orders were entered in relatively small quantities and in a manner designed to dynamically adapt to market liquidity by participating in a target percentage of 9% of the volume executed in the market. As a result of the significant volumes traded in the market, the hedge was completed in approximately twenty minutes, with more than half of the participant's volume executed as the market rallied—not as the market declined. Additionally, the aggregate size of this participant's orders was not known to other market participants. Additionally, the most precipitous period of market decline in the E-Mini S&P 500 futures on May 6 occurred during the 3½ minute period immediately preceding the market bottom that was established at 13:45:28. During that period, the participant hedging its portfolio represented less than 5% of the total volume of sales in the market.

David Leinweber, director of the Center for Innovative Financial Technology at Lawrence Berkeley National Laboratory, was invited by The Journal of Portfolio Management to write an editorial, in which he openly criticized the government's technological capabilities and inability to study today's markets. Leinweber wrote:

The heads of the SEC and CFTC often point out that they are running an IT museum. They have photographic evidence to prove it—the highest-tech background that The New York Times (on September 21, 2010) could find for a photo of Gregg Berman, the SEC's point man on the flash, was a corner with five PCs, a Bloomberg, a printer, a fax, and three TVs on the wall with several large clocks. A better measure of the inadequacy of the current mélange of IT antiquities is that the SEC/CFTC report on the May 6 crash was released on September 30, 2010. Taking nearly five months to analyze the wildest ever five minutes of market data is unacceptable. CFTC Chair Gensler specifically blamed the delay on the "enormous" effort to collect and analyze data. What an enormous mess it is.

Nanex, a leading firm specialized in the analysis of high-frequency data, also pointed out to several inconsistencies in the CFTC study:

Based on interviews and our own independent matching of the 6,438 W&R executions to the 147,577 CME executions during that time, we know for certain that the algorithm used by W&R never took nor required liquidity. It always posted sell orders above the market and waited for a buyer; it never crossed the bid/ask spread. That means that none of the 6,438 trades were executed by hitting a bid. [...] [S]tatements from page 36 of Kirilenko's paper cast serious doubt on the credibility of their analysis. [...] It is widely believed that the "sell program" refers to the algo selling the W&R contracts. However, based on the statements above, this cannot be true. The sell program must be referring to a different algo, or Kirilenko's analysis is fundamentally flawed, because the paper incorrectly identifies trades that hit the bid as executions by the W&R algo.

=== Academic research ===
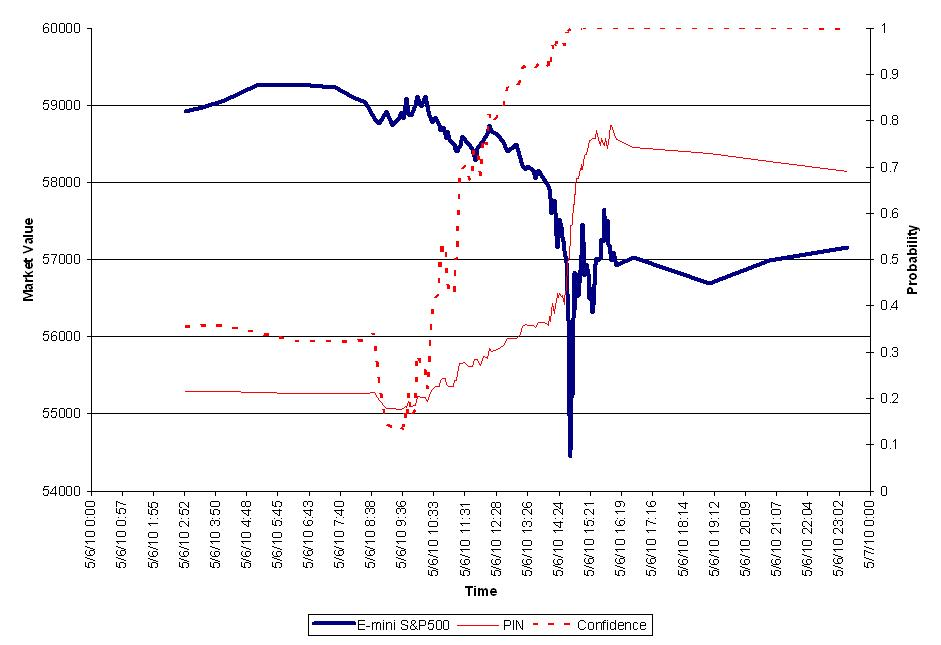
"Order flow toxicity" (measured as CDF [VPIN]) was at historically high levels one hour prior to the flash crash

External videos
- Video of the S&P500 futures during the flash crash

As of July 2011, only one theory on the causes of the flash crash was published by a Journal Citation Reports indexed, peer-reviewed scientific journal. It was reported in 2011 that one hour before its collapse in 2010, the stock market registered the highest reading of "toxic order imbalance" in previous history. The authors of this 2011 paper apply widely accepted market microstructure models to understand the behavior of prices in the minutes and hours prior to the crash. According to this paper, "order flow toxicity" can be measured as the probability that informed traders (e.g., hedge funds) adversely select uninformed traders (e.g., market makers). For that purpose, they developed the Volume-Synchronized Probability of Informed Trading (VPIN) Flow Toxicity metric, which delivered a real-time estimate of the conditions under which liquidity is being provided. If the order imbalance becomes too toxic, market makers are forced out of the market. As they withdraw, liquidity disappears, which increases even more the concentration of toxic flow in the overall volume, which triggers a feedback mechanism that forces even more market makers out. This cascading effect has caused hundreds of liquidity-induced crashes in the past, the flash crash being one (major) example of it.

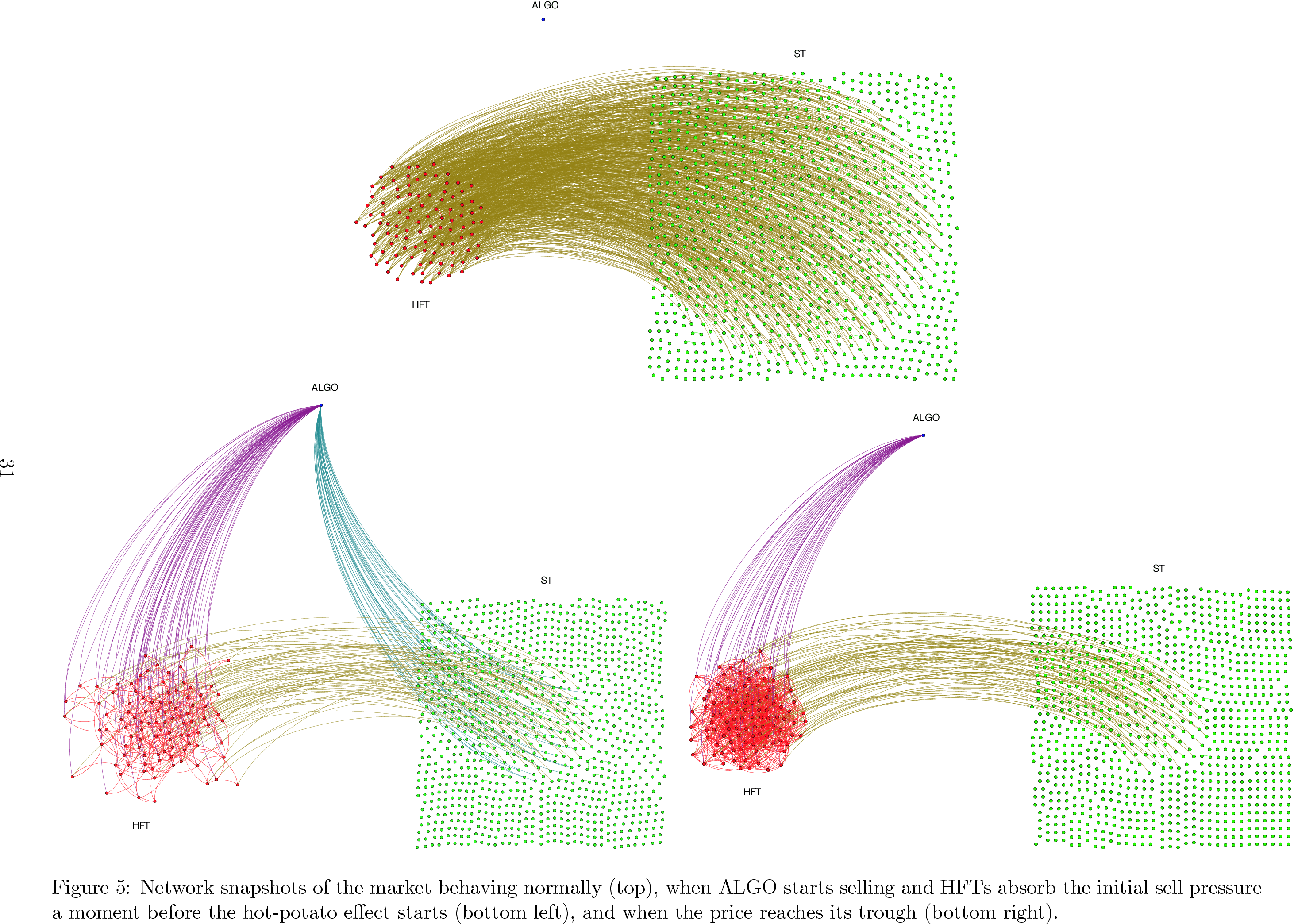
Network view of the market during the simulated flash crash. The figure demonstrates the trading behaviors between different players in the system.

However, independent studies published in 2013 strongly disputed the claim that one hour before its collapse in 2010, the stock market registered the highest reading of "toxic order imbalance" in previous history. In particular, in 2011 Andersen and Bondarenko conducted a comprehensive investigation of the two main versions of VPIN used by its creators, one based on the standard tick-rule (or TR-VPIN) and the other based on Bulk Volume Classification (or BVC-VPIN). They find that the value of TR-VPIN (BVC-VPIN) one hour before the crash "was surpassed on 71 (189) preceding days, constituting 11.7% (31.2%) of the pre-crash sample". Similarly, the value of TR-VPIN (BVC-VPIN) at the start of the crash was "topped on 26 (49) preceding days, or 4.3% (8.1%) of the pre-crash sample".

Note that the source of increasing "order flow toxicity" on May 6, 2010, is not determined in Easley, Lopez de Prado, and O'Hara's 2011 publication. Whether a dominant source of toxic order flow on May 6, 2010, was from firms representing public investors or whether a dominant source was intermediary or other proprietary traders could have a significant effect on regulatory proposals put forward to prevent another flash crash.

A study of VPIN by scientists from the Lawrence Berkeley National Laboratory cited the 2011 conclusions of Easley, Lopez de Prado and O'Hara for VPIN on S&P 500 futures but provided no independent confirmation for the claim that VPIN reached its historical high one hour before the crash:

With suitable parameters, [Easley, Lopez de Prado, and O'Hara] have shown that the [CDF of] VPIN reaches 0.9 more than an hour before the Flash Crash on May 6, 2010. This is the strongest early warning signal known to us at this time.

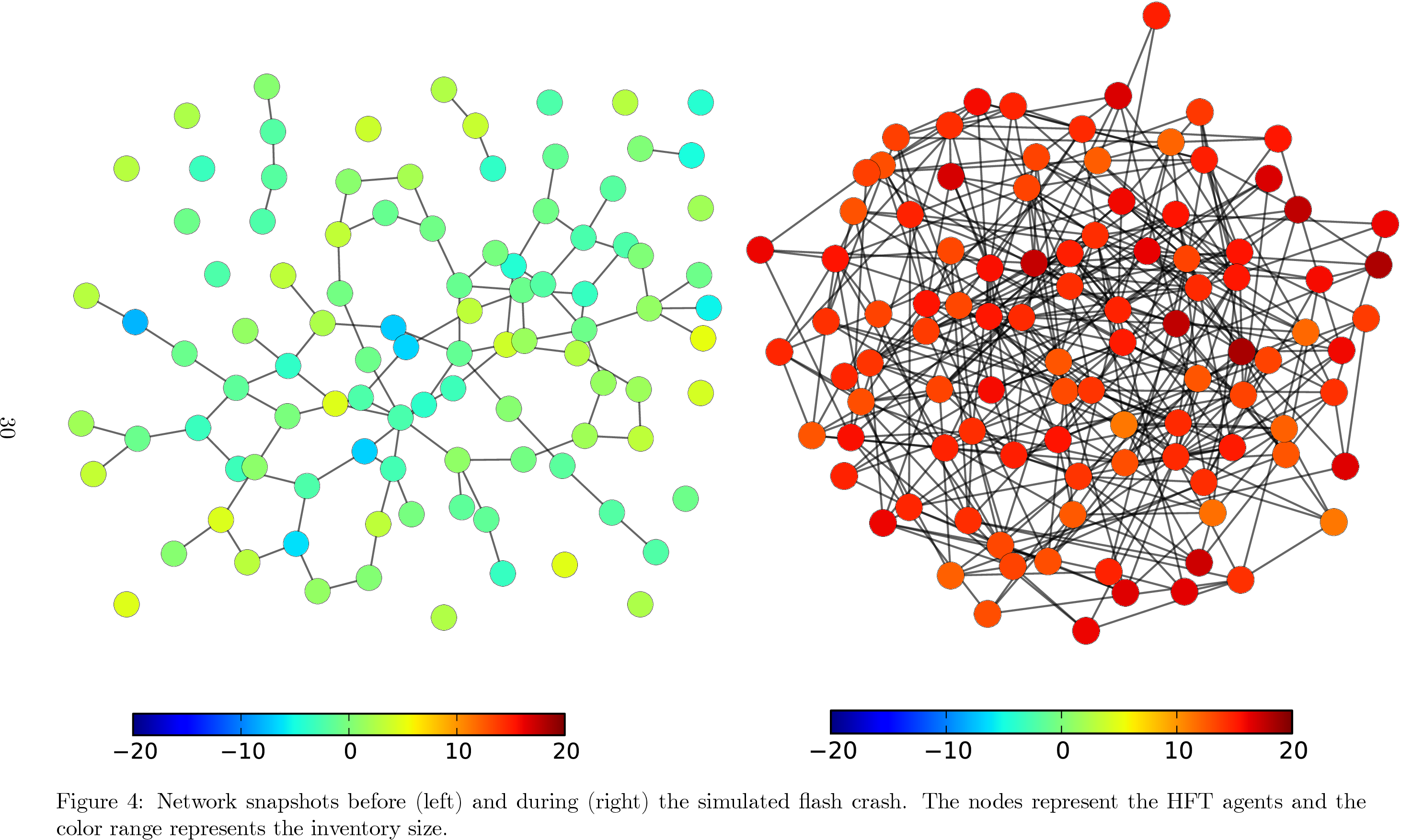
Network snapshots before (left) and during (right) the simulated flash crash. The last 400 transactions in the order-book are plotted by connecting the HFT agents who transact with each other. The node color indicates the inventory size of the HFT agent. When the market operates normally (left subplot), almost all of the HFT agents are in control of their inventory (greenish color). In crash period (right), most of the HFT agents gain large inventories (red) and the network is highly interconnected: over 85 percent of the transactions are HFT-HFT.

The Chief Economist of the Commodity Futures Trading Commission and several academic economists published a working paper containing a review and empirical analysis of trade data from the Flash Crash. The authors examined the characteristics and activities of buyers and sellers in the Flash Crash and determined that a large seller, a mutual fund firm, exhausted available fundamental buyers and then triggered a cascade of selling by intermediaries, particularly high-frequency trading firms. Like the SEC/CFTC report described earlier, the authors call this cascade of selling "hot potato trading", as high-frequency firms rapidly acquired and then liquidated positions among themselves at steadily declining prices.

The authors conclude:

Based on our analysis, we believe that High Frequency Traders exhibit trading patterns inconsistent with the traditional definition of market making. Specifically, High Frequency Traders aggressively trade in the direction of price changes. This activity comprises a large percentage of total trading volume, but does not result in a significant accumulation of inventory. As a result, whether under normal market conditions or during periods of high volatility, High Frequency Traders are not willing to accumulate large positions or absorb large losses. Moreover, their contribution to higher trading volumes may be mistaken for liquidity by Fundamental Traders. Finally, when rebalancing their positions, High Frequency Traders may compete for liquidity and amplify price volatility. Consequently, we believe, that irrespective of technology, markets can become fragile when imbalances arise as a result of large traders seeking to buy or sell quantities larger than intermediaries are willing to temporarily hold, and simultaneously long-term suppliers of liquidity are not forthcoming even if significant price concessions are offered.

Recent research on dynamical complex networks published in Nature Physics (2013) suggests that the 2010 Flash Crash may be an example of the "avoided transition" phenomenon in network systems with critical behavior.

The 2010 Flash Crash has been cited as an early example of what legal scholar Jonathan Gropper terms the 'Synthetic Outlaw' problem: an optimizing system that technically performed as designed while producing outcomes that were prohibited in effect, exposing a structural gap between formal compliance and actual harm.

=== Evidence of market manipulation and arrest ===
In April 2015, Navinder Singh Sarao, a London-based point-and-click trader, was arrested for his alleged role in the flash crash. According to criminal charges brought by the United States Department of Justice, Sarao allegedly used an automated program to generate large sell orders, pushing down prices, which he then canceled to buy at the lower market prices. The Commodity Futures Trading Commission filed civil charges against Sarao. In August 2015, Sarao was released on a £50,000 bail with a full extradition hearing scheduled for September with the US Department of Justice. Sarao and his company, Nav Sarao Futures Limited, allegedly made more than $40 million in profit from trading from 2009 to 2015.

During extradition proceedings he was represented by Richard Egan of Tuckers Solicitors.

As of 2017 Sarao's lawyers claim that all of his assets were stolen or otherwise lost in bad investments. Sarao was released on bail, banned from trading and placed under the care of his father.

Sarao pleaded guilty to one count of electronic fraud and one count of spoofing. In January 2020, he was given a sentence of one year's home confinement, with no jail time. The sentence was relatively lenient, as a result of prosecutors' emphasis on how much Sarao had cooperated with them, that he was not motivated by greed and his diagnosis of Asperger syndrome.

== Aftermath ==
=== Stock market reaction ===
A stock market anomaly, the major market indexes dropped by over 9% (including a roughly 7% decline in a roughly 15-minute span at approximately 2:45 p.m., on May 6, 2010) before a partial rebound. Temporarily, $1 trillion in market value disappeared. While stock markets do crash, immediate rebounds are rare. The stocks of eight major companies in the S&P 500 fell to one cent per share for a short time, including Accenture, CenterPoint Energy and Exelon; while other stocks, including Sotheby's, Apple Inc. and Hewlett-Packard, increased in value to over $100,000 in price. Procter & Gamble in particular dropped nearly 37% before rebounding, within minutes, back to near its original levels.

Stocks continued to rebound in the following days, helped by a bailout package in Europe to help save the euro. The S&P 500 erased all losses within a week, but selling soon took over again and the indices reached lower depths within two weeks.

=== Congressional hearings ===
The NASDAQ released their timeline of the anomalies during U.S. Congressional House Subcommittee on Capital Markets and Government-Sponsored Enterprises hearings on the flash crash. NASDAQ's timeline indicates that NYSE Arca may have played an early role and that the Chicago Board Options Exchange sent a message saying that NYSE Arca was "out of NBBO" (National best bid and offer). The Chicago Board Options Exchange, NASDAQ, NASDAQ OMX BX and BATS Exchange all declared self-help against NYSE Arca.

SEC Chairwoman Mary Schapiro testified that "stub quotes" may have played a role in certain stocks that traded for 1 cent a share. According to Schapiro:

The absurd result of valuable stocks being executed for a penny likely was attributable to the use of a practice called "stub quoting." When a market order is submitted for a stock, if available liquidity has already been taken out, the market order will seek the next available liquidity, regardless of price. When a market maker's liquidity has been exhausted, or if it is unwilling to provide liquidity, it may at that time submit what is called a stub quote—for example, an offer to buy a given stock at a penny. A stub quote is essentially a place holder quote because that quote would never—it is thought—be reached. When a market order is seeking liquidity and the only liquidity available is a penny-priced stub quote, the market order, by its terms, will execute against the stub quote. In this respect, automated trading systems will follow their coded logic regardless of outcome, while human involvement likely would have prevented these orders from executing at absurd prices. As noted below, we are reviewing the practice of displaying stub quotes that are never intended to be executed.

=== Trading curb ===
Officials announced that new trading curbs, also known as circuit breakers, would be tested during a six-month trial period ending on December 10, 2010. These circuit breakers would halt trading for five minutes on any S&P 500 stock that rises or falls more than 10 percent in a five-minute period. The circuit breakers would only be installed to the 404 New York Stock Exchange listed S&P 500 stocks. The first circuit breakers were installed to only 5 of the S&P 500 companies on Friday, June 11, to experiment with the circuit breakers. The five stocks were EOG Resources, Genuine Parts, Harley Davidson, Ryder System and Zimmer Holdings. By Monday, June 14, 44 had them. By Tuesday, June 15, the number had grown to 223, and by Wednesday, June 16, all 404 companies had circuit breakers installed. On June 16, 2010, trading in the Washington Post Company's shares were halted for five minutes after it became the first stock to trigger the new circuit breakers. Three erroneous NYSE Arca trades were said to have been the cause of the share price jump.

On May 6, the markets only broke trades that were more than 60 percent away from the reference price in a process that was not transparent to market participants. A list of 'winners' and 'losers' created by this arbitrary measure has never been made public. By establishing clear and transparent standards for breaking erroneous trades, the new rules should help provide certainty in advance as to which trades will be broken, and allow market participants to better manage their risks.

In a 2011 article that appeared on the Wall Street Journal on the eve of the anniversary of the 2010 "flash crash", it was reported that high-frequency traders were then less active in the stock market. Another article in the journal said trades by high-frequency traders had decreased to 53% of stock-market trading volume, from 61% in 2009. Former Delaware senator Edward E. Kaufman and Michigan senator Carl Levin published a 2011 op-ed in The New York Times a year after the Flash Crash, sharply critical of what they perceived to be the SEC's apparent lack of action to prevent a recurrence.

In 2011 high-frequency traders moved away from the stock market as there had been lower volatility and volume. The combined average daily trading volume in the New York Stock Exchange and Nasdaq Stock Market in the first four months of 2011 fell 15% from 2010, to an average of 6.3 billion shares a day. Trading activities declined throughout 2011, with April's daily average of 5.8 billion shares marking the lowest month since May 2008. Sharp movements in stock prices, which were frequent during the period from 2008 to the first half of 2010, were in a decline in the Chicago Board Options Exchange volatility index, the VIX, which fell to its lowest level in April 2011 since July 2007.

These volumes of trading activity in 2011, to some degree, were regarded as more natural levels than during the financial crisis and its aftermath. Some argued that those lofty levels of trading activity were never an accurate picture of demand among investors. It was a reflection of computer-driven traders passing securities back and forth between day-trading hedge funds. The flash crash exposed this phantom liquidity. In 2011 high-frequency trading firms became increasingly active in markets like futures and currencies, where volatility remains high.

In 2011 trades by high-frequency traders accounted for 28% of the total volume in the futures markets, which included currencies and commodities, an increase from 22% in 2009. However, the growth of computerized and high-frequency trading in commodities and currencies coincided with a series of "flash crashes" in those markets. The role of human market makers, who match buyers and sellers and provide liquidity to the market, was more and more played by computer programs. If those program traders pulled back from the market, then big "buy" or "sell" orders could have led to sudden, big swings. It would have increased the probability of surprise distortions, as in the equity markets, according to a professional investor. In February 2011, the sugar market took a dive of 6% in just one second. On March 1, 2011, cocoa futures prices dropped 13% in less than a minute on the Intercontinental Exchange. Cocoa plunged $450 to a low of $3,217 a metric ton before rebounding quickly. The U.S. dollar tumbled against the yen on March 16, 2011, falling 5% in minutes, one of its biggest moves ever. According to a former cocoa trader: "The electronic platform is too fast; it doesn't slow things down like humans would."

In July 2012, the SEC launched an initiative to create a new market surveillance tool known as the Consolidated Audit Trail (CAT). By April 2015, despite support for the CAT from SEC Chair Mary Jo White and members of Congress, work to finish the project continued to face delays.

== In media ==
=== Books ===
- The Fear Index by Robert Harris (2011)
- Flash Crash by Liam Vaughan (2020)

=== Film ===
- Flash Crash (Announced)
- Bloomberg Quicktake: The Wild $50M Ride of the Flash Crash Trader
