= Flash crash =

Rapid fall in security prices within a very short time period

In modern finance, a flash crash is a very rapid, deep, and volatile fall in security prices occurring within a very short time period followed by a quick recovery. Flash crashes are frequently blamed by media on trades executed by black-box trading, combined with high-frequency trading, whose speed and interconnectedness can result in the loss and recovery of billions of dollars in a matter of minutes and seconds, but in reality occur because almost all participants have pulled their liquidity and temporarily paused their trading in the face of a sudden increase in risk.

== Occurrences ==
Examples of flash crashes that have occurred:

- May 6, 2010, flash crash
- April 23, 2013, flash crash
- Frankenshock, or Flash Crash Swiss Franc on January 15, 2015
- Flash Crash of the British Pound on October 6, 2016
- Flash Crash of Japanese Yen on January 2, 2019
- Flash Crash of European Stock Markets on May 2, 2022.

=== 2010 flash crash ===
This type of event occurred on May 6, 2010 in the United States. A $4.1 billion trade on the New York Stock Exchange (NYSE) resulted in a loss to the Dow Jones Industrial Average of over 1,000 points and then a rise to approximately the previous value, all over about fifteen minutes. The mechanism causing the event has been heavily researched and is in dispute. On April 21, 2015, the U.S. Department of Justice laid "22 criminal counts, including fraud and market manipulation" against Navinder Singh Sarao, a trader. Among the charges included was the use of spoofing algorithms.

=== 2017 Ethereum Flash Crash ===
On June 22, 2017, the price of Ethereum, the second-largest digital cryptocurrency, dropped from more than $300 to as low as $0.10 in minutes at GDAX exchange. Suspected for market manipulation or an account takeover at first, later investigation by GDAX claimed no indication of wrongdoing. The crash was triggered by a multimillion-dollar selling order which brought the price down, from $317.81 to $224.48, and caused the following flood of 800 stop-loss and margin funding liquidation orders, crashing the market.

=== British pound flash crash ===
On October 7, 2016, there was a flash crash in the value of sterling, which dropped more than 6% in two minutes against the US dollar. It was the pound's lowest level against the dollar since May 1985. The pound recovered much of its value in the next few minutes, but ended down on the day's trading, most likely due to market concerns about the impact of a "hard Brexit"—a more complete break with the European Union following Britain's 'Leave' referendum vote in June. It was initially speculated that the flash crash may have been due to a fat-finger trader error or an algorithm reacting to negative news articles about the British Government's European policy.

=== USD-JPY and AUD-USD flash crash ===
On January 2, 2019, a flash crash was seen in the value of the United States dollar (USD) vs the Japanese yen (JPY) and the Australian dollar (AUD) vs USD, which dropped more than 4% in a few minutes. It was the USD lowest level against the yen and AUD against USD since March 2009. The USD-JPY and AUD-USD recovered much of their value in the next few minutes. It was speculated that the flash crash may have been due to Apple Inc. reporting reduced sales forecast in China but this seems unlikely as the report came out an hour before the actual crash. The lows reported on USD-JPY also varied with Reuters reporting a low of 104.90 on USD-JPY while FXMarketAPI reported a low of 104.45.

=== Flash Crash of European Stock Markets on May 2, 2022 ===
On May 2, 2022, from 9:56 to 10:01 CET the Swedish OMXS30 index dropped 6.8%, the Norwegian OBX 4.1%, the Danish OMXC25 -6.7% and the Finnish OMXH25 -7.5%. Other European indices dropped too, although not as severely as the Nordic exchanges. The German DAX dropped 1.6% and the European STOXX 600 2.2%. At their lowest point around €300bn or $315bn had been erased from the markets. The indices quickly rebounded to levels at or slightly below what it was before the crash. A spokesperson for Nasdaq said the crash was not because of internal server errors or hacker attacks. Nasdaq stated that trades done during the crash would not be cancelled on the exchanges that it operates. There were rumors that Citigroup had accidentally sold a large basket of European stocks over the market. Later in the afternoon Nasdaq confirmed that the flash crash was due to a very large accidental sell order by a market participant, a so-called fat-finger error. Nasdaq would not comment which market participant it was. Later in the day Citigroup admitted that the crash was caused by "an error when inputting a transaction" by one of its traders at their London trading desk.

=== Other crashes ===
In October 2013, a flash crash occurred on the Singapore Exchange which wiped out $6.9 billion in capitalization and saw some stocks lose up to 87 percent of their value. The crash resulted in new regulations being announced in August 2014. Minimum trading prices of 0.20 cents per share would be introduced, short positions would be required to be reported, and a 5 percent collateral levy implemented. The exchange said the measures were to curb excessive speculation and potential share price manipulation.

Two short-lived (less than a second) movements (more than 1%) in several (40 and 88) stock prices followed by recovery were reported for November 25, 2014.

== Significance of recovery ==
Events described as flash crashes typically exhibit a rapid partial or total price rebound. Conversely, rapid price falls in response to adverse news (e.g. disappointing earnings announcements) which do not rapidly revert are simply crashes or, colloquially, falling knives.

== See also ==
- Stock market crash
- Fat-finger error
- Kennedy Slide of 1962
