= Spoofing (finance) =

Disruptive trading activity to manipulate markets

Spoofing is a disruptive algorithmic trading activity employed by traders to outpace other market participants and to manipulate markets. Spoofers feign interest in trading futures, stocks, and other products in financial markets creating an illusion of the demand and supply of the traded asset. In an order driven market, spoofers post a relatively large number of limit orders on one side of the limit order book to make other market participants believe that there is pressure to sell (limit orders are posted on the offer side of the book) or to buy (limit orders are posted on the bid side of the book) the asset.

Spoofing may cause prices to change because the market interprets the one-sided pressure in the limit order book as a shift in the balance of the number of investors who wish to purchase or sell the asset, which causes prices to increase (more buyers than sellers) or prices to decline (more sellers than buyers). Spoofers bid or offer with intent to cancel before the orders are filled. The flurry of activity around the buy or sell orders is intended to attract other traders to induce a particular market reaction. Spoofing can be a factor in the rise and fall of the price of shares and can be very profitable to the spoofer who can time buying and selling based on this manipulation.

Under the 2010 Dodd–Frank Act, spoofing is defined as "the illegal practice of bidding or offering with intent to cancel before execution." Spoofing can be used with layering algorithms and front-running, activities which are also illegal.

High-frequency trading, the primary form of algorithmic trading used in financial markets, is very profitable as it deals in high volumes of transactions. The five-year delay in arresting the lone spoofer, Navinder Singh Sarao, accused of exacerbating the 2010 Flash Crash—one of the most turbulent periods in the history of financial markets—has placed the self-regulatory bodies such as the Commodity Futures Trading Commission (CFTC) and Chicago Mercantile Exchange & Chicago Board of Trade (CME Group) under scrutiny. The CME group was described as being in a "massively conflicted" position as they make huge profits from HFT (high frequency trading) and algorithmic trading.

== Definition ==
In Australia, layering and spoofing in 2014 referred to the act of "submitting a genuine order on one side of the book and multiple orders at different prices on the other side of the book to give the impression of substantial supply/demand, with a view to sucking in other orders to hit the genuine order. After the genuine order trades, the multiple orders on the other side are rapidly withdrawn."

In a 2012 report Finansinspektionen (FI), the Swedish Financial Supervisory Authority defined spoofing/layering as "a strategy of placing orders that is intended to manipulate the price of an instrument, for example through a combination of buy and sell orders."

In the U.S. Department of Justice April 21, 2015 complaint of market manipulation and fraud laid against Navinder Singh Sarao, — dubbed the Hounslow day-trader — appeared "to have used this 188-and-289-lot spoofing technique in certain instances to intensify the manipulative effects of his dynamic layering technique...The purpose of these bogus orders is to trick other market participants and manipulate the product's market price." He employed the technique of dynamic layering, a form of market manipulation in which traders "place large sell orders for contracts" tied to the Standard & Poor's 500 Index. Sarao used his customized computer-trading program from 2009 onwards.

== Milestone case against spoofing ==
In July 2013 the US Commodity Futures Trading Commission (CFTC) and Britain's Financial Conduct Authority (FCA) brought a milestone case against spoofing which represents the first Dodd-Frank Act application. A federal grand jury in Chicago indicted Panther Energy Trading and Michael Coscia, a high-frequency trader. In 2011 Coscia placed spoofed orders through CME Group Inc. and European futures markets with profits of almost $1.6 million. Coscia was charged with six counts of spoofing with each count carrying a maximum sentence of ten years in prison and a maximum fine of one million dollars. The illegal activity undertaken by Coscia and his firm took place in a six-week period from "August 8, 2011 through October 18, 2011 on CME Group’s Globex trading platform." They used a "computer algorithm that was designed to unlawfully place and quickly cancel orders in exchange-traded futures contracts." They placed a "relatively small order to sell futures that they did want to execute, which they quickly followed with several large buy orders at successively higher prices that they intended to cancel. By placing the large buy orders, Mr. Coscia and Panther sought to give the market the impression that there was significant buying interest, which suggested that prices would soon rise, raising the likelihood that other market participants would buy from the small order Coscia and Panther were then offering to sell." Coscia was later found guilty of fraud and spoofing. He was sentenced to three years in prison followed by two years of supervised release.

Britain's FCA is also fining Coscia and his firm approximately $900,000 for "taking advantage of the price movements generated by his layering strategy" relating to his market abuse activities on the ICE Futures Europe exchange. They earned US$279,920 in profits over the six weeks period "at the expense of other market participants – primarily other High Frequency Traders or traders using algorithmic and/or automated systems."

== Providence vs Wall Street ==
On 18 April 2014 Robbins Geller Rudman & Dowd LLP filed a class-action lawsuit on behalf of the city of Providence, Rhode Island in Federal Court in the Southern District of New York. The complaint in the high frequency matter named "every major stock exchange in the U.S." This includes the New York Stock Exchange, Nasdaq, Better Alternative Trading System (Bats) — an electronic communication network (ECN) – and Direct Edge among others. The suit also names major Wall Street firms including but not limited to, Goldman Sachs, Citigroup, JPMorgan and the Bank of America. High-frequency trading firms and hedge funds are also named in the lawsuit. The lawsuit claimed that, "For at least the last five years, the Defendants routinely engaged in at least the following manipulative, self-dealing and deceptive conduct," which included "spoofing – where the HFT Defendants send out orders with corresponding cancellations, often at the opening or closing of the stock market, in order to manipulate the market price of a security and/or induce a particular market reaction."

== Dodd–Frank Wall Street Reform and Consumer Protection Act ==
CFTC's Enforcement Director, David Meister, explained the difference between legal and illegal use of algorithmic trading,

“While forms of algorithmic trading are of course lawful, using a computer program that is written to spoof the market is illegal and will not be tolerated. We will use the Dodd Frank anti-disruptive practices provision against schemes like this one to protect market participants and promote market integrity, particularly in the growing world of electronic trading platforms."

— David Meister CFTC 2013

It is "against the law to spoof, or post requests to buy or sell futures, stocks and other products in financial markets without intending to actually follow through on those orders." Anti-spoofing statute is part of the 2010 Dodd-Frank Wall Street Reform and Consumer Protection Act passed on July 21, 2010. The Dodd-Frank brought significant changes to financial regulation in the United States. It made changes in the American financial regulatory environment that affect all federal financial regulatory agencies and almost every part of the nation's financial services industry.

Eric Moncada, another trader is accused of spoofing in wheat futures markets and faces CFTC fines of $1.56 million.

In September 2020 the CFTC ordered JPMorgan Chase & Company and two of its subsidiaries to pay $920.2 million over spoofing and manipulation in precious metals and U.S. Treasury futures. It was the largest monetary relief the agency had ever imposed. According to the order, traders on the bank's precious metals and Treasuries desks placed hundreds of thousands of spoof orders from at least 2008 through 2016. The Department of Justice and the Securities and Exchange Commission announced parallel resolutions the same day.

== 2010 Flash Crash and the lone Hounslow day-trader ==
On April 21, 2015, five years after the incident, the U.S. Department of Justice laid "22 criminal counts, including fraud and market manipulation" against Navinder Singh Sarao, who became known as the Hounslow day-trader. Among the charges included was the use of spoofing algorithms, in which first, just prior to the Flash Crash, he placed thousands of E-mini S&P 500 stock index futures contract orders. These orders, amounting to about "$200 million worth of bets that the market would fall" were "replaced or modified 19,000 times" before they were cancelled that afternoon. Spoofing, layering and front-running are now banned. The CTFC concluded that Sarao "was at least significantly responsible for the order imbalances" in the derivatives market which affected stock markets and exacerbated the flash crash. Sarao began his alleged market manipulation in 2009 with commercially available trading software whose code he modified "so he could rapidly place and cancel orders automatically." Sarao is a 36-year-old small-time trader who worked from his parents’ modest semi-attached stucco house in Hounslow in suburban west London. Traders Magazine correspondent John Bates argues that by April 2015, traders can still manipulate and impact markets in spite of regulators and banks' new, improved monitoring of automated trade systems. For years, Sarao denounced high-frequency traders, some of them billion-dollar organisations, who mass manipulate the market by generating and retract numerous buy and sell orders every millisecond ("quote stuffing") — which he witnessed when placing trades at the Chicago Mercantile Exchange (CME). Sarao claimed that he made his choices to buy and sell based on opportunity and intuition and did not consider himself to be one of the HFTs. In November 2016 Sarao pleaded guilty in a Chicago federal court to one count each of wire fraud and spoofing. In January 2020 a Chicago court sentenced him to one year of home incarceration.

The 2010 Flash Crash was a United States trillion-dollar stock market crash, in which the "S&P 500, the Nasdaq 100, and the Russell 2000 collapsed and rebounded with extraordinary velocity." Dow Jones Industrial Average "experienced the biggest intraday point decline in its entire history," plunging 998.5 points (about 9%), most within minutes, only to recover a large part of the loss. A CFTC 2014 report described it as one of the most turbulent periods in the history of financial markets.

In 2011 the chief economist of the Bank of England — Andrew Haldane — delivered a famous speech entitled the "Race to Zero" at the International Economic Association Sixteenth World Congress in which he described how "equity prices of some of the world’s biggest companies were in freefall. They appeared to be in a race to zero. Peak to trough." At the time of the speech Haldane acknowledged that there were many theories about the cause of the Flash Crash but that academics, governments and financial experts remained "agog."

"The Flash Crash was a near miss. It taught us something important, if uncomfortable, about our state of knowledge of modern financial markets. Not just that it was imperfect, but that these imperfections may magnify, sending systemic shockwaves. Technology allows us to thin-slice time. But thinner technological slices may make for fatter market tails. Flash Crashes, like car crashes, may be more severe the greater the velocity. Physical catastrophes alert us to the costs of ignoring these events, of normalizing deviance. There is nothing normal about recent deviations in financial markets. The race to zero may have contributed to those abnormalities, adding liquidity during a monsoon and absorbing it during a drought. This fattens tail risk. Understanding and correcting those tail events is a systemic issue. It may call for new rules of the road for trading. Grit in the wheels, like grit on the roads, could help forestall the next crash."

— Andrew Haldane, Bank of England July 8, 2011 page 18

== See also ==
- Algorithmic trading
- Complex event processing
- Computational finance
- Dark liquidity
- Data mining
- Erlang (programming language) used by Goldman Sachs
- Flash trading
- Front running
- Hedge fund
- Hot money
- IEX
- Market maker
- Mathematical finance
- Offshore fund
- Pump and dump
- Quantitative trading
- Short (finance)
- Statistical arbitrage
