= Lotfi Raissi =

Algerian wrongly accused of terrorism (born 1974)

- Born: April 4, 1974 (age 52); Bab El Oued, Algiers, Algeria
- Citizenship: Algerian, British
- Known for: Wrongly accused of being involved with the 9/11 terrorist attacks
- Spouse: Sonia

Lotfi Raissi (Arabic: لطفي رئيسي, Luṭfī Rayissī; born April 4, 1974), was the first person charged in connection with the September 11, 2001, attacks. However, in 2003 a British court ruled that the charges against Raissi were without evidence, and that he had no association with the attacks. In April 2010 it was announced that he was eligible for compensation, the amount of which was as yet undecided.

== Background ==
Raissi was born and grew up in Bab el Oued, a suburb of Algiers. In November 1996, he moved to Phoenix, Arizona, USA, to attend flight school, including a 1998 stint at Sawyer School of Aviation a month after Hani Hanjour quit.

In April 2000, when his student visa expired, he moved back to Algeria and then to London, with his wife Sonia (née Demolis), whom he had met in the United States.

From June 11–18, 2001, Raissi had apparently visited Las Vegas, while Ziad Jarrah was in the city. On his way home from the city, he was given a citation for speeding in Arizona.

== Implication in 9/11 terrorist attacks ==
=== Arrest and Investigation ===
Raissi was living outside Colnbrook (near Heathrow) at the time of the attacks. He was arrested at 3 am on September 21, 2001, when he was taken from his house naked, along with his wife Sonia and his brother. The Times obtained a copy of the FBI's initial request for information about Raissi. In it, The Times asserts, the FBI requested that British authorities use discretion, in order not to tip him off that he was under suspicion.

Raissi's brother and wife Sonia were released by British police four days after the arrests, although Sonia lost her job working with Air France and his brother's wife lost her job at Heathrow Airport as well. From there Raissi was detained for five months at Belmarsh Prison, under suspicion of training the pilots who flew the jet into the Pentagon. He was also charged with using a "false identity" having gone by the name "Fabrice Vincent Algier", and for conspiring to help Redouane Dahmani lie on his visa application.

After a week of interrogation by US officials, and British prosecutor James Lewis, made an extradition request; ironically, due to a lack of evidence that he was involved in the September 11 attacks, the only charge he could be held on was lying on his pilot's licence application by not revealing he had undergone knee surgery after a tennis injury, and a charge for shoplifting at a London airport dating to 1993. Raissi's attorney was Richard Egan

British prosecutor Arvinder Sambei (who became a director of Amicus Legal Consultants, which is now Sambei, Bridger & Polaine) publicly announced that the FBI had discovered Raissi's name in Salem al-Hazmi's rental vehicle; that a raid on Raissi's home had turned up video evidence on his computer of him and Hani Hanjour celebrating together; that further telephone records confirmed their suspicions that he had trained four of the hijackers in an effort to help support terrorism against U.S. interests, that his pilot logbook was missing all data from March 2000 to June 2001, and stated that they might seek the death penalty. However once his trial began, they were unable to produce any such evidence. According to The Times;

A video that the FBI claimed showed Mr Raissi with Hani Hanjour, one of the hijackers, was revealed in court to be footage of him with his cousin.

On February 12, 2002, Judge Timothy Workman allowed Raissi to post £10,000 bail and surrender his passport, after stating that there seemed to be no credibility to the US claims. He was formally released from charges on April 21.

=== Lawsuits ===
In September 2003, Raissi announced he was suing the FBI and the Department of Justice for $10 million over claims that his life had been ruined by his being branded a terrorist and that he was unable to find work.

The suit, carried by Richard Egan and Jules Carey of Tuckers Solicitors, alleges false imprisonment, false arrest, malicious prosecution, malicious continuation of prosecution, abuse of process, intentional infliction of emotional distress, and negligence in infliction of emotional distress. Amnesty International's Paul Hoffman was one of the lawyers handling the case.

Raissi launched a civil suit against the Mail on Sunday for printing false information about criminal charges he faced, and citing the fact that airlines will not hire him because of the accusations against him. He was awarded an undisclosed sum.

On February 22, 2007, Raissi lost his case in the UK High Court to claim compensation for wrongful arrest and the 5 months he spent in Belmarsh Prison. Judges ruled him ineligible on the grounds that he had been held as part of an extradition case rather than 'in the domestic criminal process'. He took his case to the Court of Appeal and the High Court ruling was overturned, Appeal Judges stating that evidence showed the Crown Prosecution Service and the Police were responsible for "serious defaults".

Raissi's case remains a contentious issue in Algeria, whose government refuses to sign an agreement with Britain about extraditing hijackers until Britain acknowledges that its treatment of Raissi was flawed. British authorities continue to insist that British police and prosecutors acted properly, and it was American authorities who were at fault for supplying them with bad intelligence.

In February 2008, the UK Court of Appeal rejected this position, 'completely exonerated' Raissi, and ordered British authorities to reconsider his entitlement to compensation, which had previously been rejected. It also found that the Crown Prosecution Service and the police had presented false evidence to the courts.

His application for permission to enforce the order of the Court of Appeal, and contempt of court proceedings against the Home Office, resulted in an announcement on 23 April 2010 by the Secretary of State for Justice Jack Straw that Raissi is eligible for up to £2m compensation.
