= Trustifi =

- Type: Private
- Industry: Computer security
- Founded: 2017; 9 years ago in Las Vegas, Nevada
- Founders: Antoinette Chaltiel
- Headquarters: Las Vegas, Nevada, United States
- Area served: Worldwide
- Key people: Rom Hendler (CEO)
- Products: Trustifi platform
- Website: trustifi.com

Trustifi is a developer of cloud-based email security software based in Las Vegas, Nevada.

== History ==
The concept behind Trustifi was developed in 2009 by Las Vegas mayoral candidate Victor Chaltiel, who envisioned an email security service that could protect messages from interception and provide tracking for sent correspondence. Following his death in 2014, his wife, Antoinette "Toni" Chaltiel, founded Trustifi in 2017 to continue the project and appointed Idan Udi Edry as CEO.

In March 2018, Trustifi launched its SaaS-based "Postmarked Email" service, presented as a digital alternative to certified mail from the United States Postal Service.

In September 2020, Rom Hendler, a former executive at Las Vegas Sands and co-founder of Trustifi who had previously served as chairman, succeeded Edry as CEO.

In June 2025, Trustifi closed a $25 million Series A funding round led by New York City-based growth equity firm Camber Partners.

== Platform ==
Trustifi operates a cloud-based email security platform that detects phishing, malware, business email compromise (BEC), spoofing, and ransomware. Its core products include Inbound Shield, email encryption with multi-factor authentication, and data Loss Prevention (DLP) for detecting sensitive information in outbound emails. Other features include account takeover protection, email archiving, and security awareness training tools with phishing simulations and attack-based training content.
