= Aukai Collins =

American Islamist (1974–2016)

Aukai Collins aka "Abu Mudjahid "
- Born: February 13, 1974; Hawaii, United States
- Died: July 19, 2016 (aged 42); Oceanside, California, United States
- Occupations: Author; Mujahid

Aukai Collins, also known as Aqil Collins (February 13, 1974 – July 19, 2016) was an American convert to Islam and Chechen Mujahid of the Chechen Republic of Ichkeria.

He then, among other things, went on to work as a deep cover intelligence operative for the FBI.

His exploits, which included contacts with Al Qaeda leading operatives, are described in the autobiographical book My Jihad: One American's Journey Through the World of Usama Bin Laden—as a Covert Operative for the American Government (ISBN 0-7434-7059-1).

In this book, he distinguishes between the Chechen armed resistance against the Russian army, which he regards as justified according to Islam, and terrorism in Al Qaeda style, which he regards as contrary to Islam.

He also claimed that he warned the FBI long before the September 11 attacks that Hani Hanjour, one of the September 11 hijackers, was using a Phoenix flight school as his training ground for terrorism. The FBI emphatically denied that Collins provided any information to the FBI about Hanjour prior to 9/11 but admitted that Collins did have some dealings with FBI operatives.

He also appears in Canadian-born adventurer Robert Young Pelton's book, The Hunter, The Hammer, and Heaven: Journeys to Three Worlds Gone Mad and director Lech Kowalski's short film documentary Camera Gun.

After authoring My Jihad, Collins became a bounty hunter, which ultimately led to his arrest in Mexico on weapons charges. He was released in May 2006 after serving a 4-year prison sentence in Durango, Mexico.

He died on July 19, 2016, of sepsis in Oceanside, California.
