= Nanex =

American software firm

Nanex, LLC
- Type: Private
- Industry: Software engineering
- Founded: 2000; 26 years ago
- Founder: Eric Scott Hunsader
- Headquarters: Winnetka, Illinois, Chicago metropolitan area
- Key people: Eric Scott Hunsader (CEO)
- Products: Financial market data Stock Market
- Services: streaming data
- Number of employees: 8 (2013)
- Website: www.nanex.net

Nanex is a Chicago-based firm that offers streaming market data services, and real-time analysis and visualization tools. They offer data on all market transactions to their clients who are typically traders and other financial analysis firms. "The company can analyse millions of trades per second."

Nanex is the creator and developer of NxCore, a ticker plant that delivers streaming whole market data from Telvent DTN and provides an application programming interface. The company was founded in 2000 and is located in Winnetka, Illinois.

The founder and CEO of Nanex, Eric Scott Hunsader, is a vocal critic of some aspects of high-frequency trading and has clashed on Twitter with defenders of the system. Hunsader's firm is known for having coined the term quote stuffing. Bloomberg called Nanex the "nemesis" of high-frequency traders.

Hunsader's views, as well as the record of market transactions released by Nanex, have been cited in many financial analyses done in news articles about strange financial events, such as the 2010 Flash Crash, the Gold Flash Crash in early January 2014, and suspicious trading patterns.
