= 2018 Samsung fat-finger error =

Mistaken share distribution to employees

The 2018 Samsung fat-finger error was a fat-finger error on April 8, 2018, in which an employee of Samsung Securities mistakenly distributed shares worth US$100 billion to employees. The company is the stock trading arm of the Samsung conglomerate and is engaged in financial services including securities and investment banking sectors primarily in Korea, China, the United States, the United Kingdom, Japan, and Hong Kong.

== Error ==
The error happened when Samsung Securities tried to pay a dividend to about 2,000 employees who participated in the company stock ownership plan. The intent was to give each of those employees 1,000 South Korean won, worth about US$1, but instead issued 2.8 billion shares. These shares were worth about 112.6 trillion won, or 30 times the market capitalization of the company. The company noticed the error 37 minutes later. However, while the shares were issued and before the company noticed, 16 employees sold the shares which the company gave them. Some of these employees, according to the country's Financial Supervisory Service, proceeded with the sale despite receiving warnings from the company. The employees who sold their shares could have received US$9 million each. A South Korean financial watchdog later found that 21 employees traded or attempted to sell their shares to profit from the error and were promptly reported to prosecutors.

When Samsung Securities provided the shares, it used a process of naked short selling which is illegal in Korea and which the computer infrastructure was not supposed to allow.

== Consequences ==
The error caused the price of Samsung stock to drop by 11 percent within a day and to fluctuate after that. The Financial Supervisory Service said that the incident undermined trust in the Korean capital market.

The National Pension Service halted trading immediately after the error. This pension fund has 136 trillion won or US$127 billion invested in the Korean stock market. By May 7, 2018, Samsung Securities stated that it would file criminal lawsuits against employees who sold their shares during the fat finger incident. On May 28, 2018, government prosecutors raided the Samsung offices.
