= Rescission (contract law) =

Remedy which allows a contractual party to cancel the contract

In contract law, rescission is an equitable or legal remedy which allows a contractual party to cancel the contract. Parties may rescind if they are the victims of a vitiating factor, such as misrepresentation, mistake, duress, or undue influence. Rescission is the unwinding of a transaction. This is done to bring the parties, as far as possible, back to the position in which they were before they entered into a contract (the status quo ante).

== Taxonomy ==
Rescission is used throughout the law in a number of different senses. The failure to draw these crucial distinctions is productive of serious confusion. Although Judicature legislation has been enacted throughout the common law world, and jurisdictions vary in their recognition of a distinct body of law known as equity, reference to the jurisdictional origins is still important for the purposes of exposition.

- "Rescission" in the sense of termination. Rescission in this sense is not the focus of this article. Where a contract is terminated, obligations under the contract are only discharged prospectively; the contract is not rendered void ab initio. Rescission in the sense of termination covers two key situations:
  - First, where a party to a contract exercises an express right of termination, he or she is sometimes said to have exercised a right to rescind the contract.
  - Secondly, where a party is faced with a repudiation, the party can elect to terminate the contract; this too has often been referred to as an election to rescind.
- "Rescission" at common law. Rescission at common law (as distinct from rescission in equity) is a self-help remedy: historically, the common law courts simply gave effect to the rescinding party's unequivocal election to rescind the contract. Rescission at common law is only available for fraudulent misrepresentations and duress. Rescission renders the contract void ab initio, and courts will only grant rescission under common law if the parties can be restored to their original positions prior to the formation of the contract ("restitutio in integrum"). Courts of Equity exercised a jurisdiction to effect rescission where restoring the parties to the contract to their pre-contract positions was not possible at common law.
- "Rescission" in equity. Rescission is available in equity's exclusive jurisdiction in a wide range of situations. For example, where there has been an innocent but material misrepresentation, a breach of fiduciary duty, unconscionable conduct, or equitable fraud.

== In equity ==
As an equitable remedy, equitable rescission is available only at the discretion of the court. It is used as a synonym for termination at law. A court may decline to rescind a contract if one party has affirmed the contract by his action, or a third party has acquired some rights or there has been substantial performance in implementing the contract. To improve chances of being granted rescission, parties may do well to describe those circumstances which may give rise to an entitlement to terminate, as was done in Koompahtoo Local Aboriginal Land Council v Sanpine Pty Ltd. Furthermore, because rescission is supposed to be imposed mutually upon both sides to a contract, the party seeking rescission normally must offer to give back all benefits he or she has received under the contract (an "offer of tender").

The US state of Virginia uses the term "cancellation" for equitable rescission. Furthermore, a minority of common law jurisdictions, like South Africa, use the term "rescission" for what other jurisdictions call "reversing", "overturning" or "overruling" a court judgment. In this sense, the term means to be set aside or make void, on application to the court that granted the judgment or to a higher court. Applications to rescind a judgment are usually made on the basis of error or for good cause.

In Australia, the Court of Equity may grant partial relief under the contract if good conscience and practical justice are observed by the court.

== By private companies ==
In finance, law, and insurance, rescission is the termination of a contract from the beginning (as if it never existed), rendering it void ab initio. In 2009, one judge ruled that borrowers who refinanced into an adjustable-rate mortgage could force a bank to rescind mortgage loans if it acted similarly inappropriately. Rescission is typically viewed as "an extreme remedy" which is "rarely granted".

=== Stock market transactions ===
In order to have legal certainty and in order to avoid the situation that courts have to decide ex-post if a trade should be binding or not, erroneous trade rules of exchanges usually exclude civil-law rescission rights.

This explains why banks usually have to carry huge losses when clearly erroneous trades occurred that have not been detected within 30 minutes.

=== Insurance ===
Insurers have the right to rescind an insurance policy due to concealment, material misrepresentation, or material breach of warranty. Generally, to rescind, an insurer will send a notice to the insured and tender a check in the amount of the premium paid for the relevant policy period

In health insurance and specifically the individual and small group insurance markets, rescissions have generally followed the diagnosis of an expensive-to-treat illness in the patient (policyholder), typically because of withheld information about a pre-existing medical condition. Public awareness of this practice increased during the 2009 US healthcare debate, when it was described colloquially as "cancel coverage when you get sick". The practice of health insurance rescission was partially limited starting September 23, 2010, following the adoption of the Patient Protection and Affordable Care Act in 2010. A House committee report found that WellPoint (now Anthem), UnitedHealth Group and Assurant rescinded policies for more than 20,000 people over a five-year period; the House report also highlighted 13 particular cases.

In 2010, it was revealed that WellPoint specifically targeted women with breast cancer for aggressive investigation with the intent to cancel (rescind) their policies. The disclosures followed the discovery that Assurant Health similarly targeted all recently diagnosed HIV-positive (AIDS) policyholders for rescission. U.S. Department of Health and Human Services (HHS) Secretary Kathleen Sebelius sent a letter to WellPoint urging the insurer to immediately end their practice of dropping health insurance coverage for the women.

The software technology used by Wellpoint as well as other major American health insurance companies is provided by MIB Group. The software automatically triggered a fraud investigation on every policyholder recently diagnosed with breast cancer and searched for conditions not disclosed in the application. The MIB Group provides a "Follow-up Service" which allows for a "second chance" to underwrite based on additional, discovered information during the contestable period. The service is maintained for two years after initial underwriting and may include, among other information credit history, medical conditions, driving records, criminal activity, drug use, participation in hazardous sports, and personal or family genetic history. Consumers can request a copy of the data in their report from MIB Group. The insurer is additionally required to prove an "intent to deceive" in the misrepresentation, this fraud or intent requirement was extended federally for health insurance contracts effective September 23, 2010 by Section 2712 of the Patient Protection and Affordable Care Act. In the long-run the change may have little effect in practice given that the bill eventually will not allow underwriting based on preexisting conditions. Previously, most states required proving "intent to deceive".
