= Richard Egan (solicitor) =

- Born: Richard Egan
- Occupation: Defence lawyer
- Years active: 1990–present
- Known for: Advocacy in high-profile criminal cases
- Awards: Legal Aid Lawyer of the Year Award
- Website: TuckersSolicitors.com

Richard Egan is an English solicitor known for his work and advocacy in high-profile criminal defence cases. He is also known as a charity worker and a recipient of Legal Aid Lawyer of the Year award he was awarded in recognition for his work defending Lotfi Raissi who was wrongly accused of training September 11 hijackers. In 2014 Egan came to notice after successful defence of Tania Clarence who was charged with murder of her two children after her unsuccessful legal battle with social workers. After a series of defence motions, murder charge was reduced to that of a manslaughter by diminished responsibility and Clarence was given a hospital order.

== Career ==
Egan qualified as a solicitor in 1990 and joined Tuckers Solicitors, law firm based in London, where he became a partner in 2001. His work is focused mainly on criminal defence.

== Experience ==
Egan is a member of the London Criminal Courts Solicitors Association and Association of Military Court Advocates and Justice. He has gathered local attention in London for his aggressive defence style and was one of those who contended that solicitor advocates should be entitled to wear the same wig and gown in court as barristers.

=== Notable cases ===
Egan's work has included acting for:

- Lotfi Raissi, Algerian pilot who allegedly instructed four of the hijackers who crashed the plane into the Pentagon on September 11. The prosecution case was that Raissi qualified in the United States as a pilot in 1997, attending the same Arizona flight school as four of the hijackers involved in the attacks September 11. Raissi was acquitted after trial.
- Navinder Singh Sarao, accused of triggering a multibillion-dollar Wall Street crash, who was represented by Egan prior to and during extradition proceedings.
- Surinder Pal Singh Sappal, who was the only defendant acquitted in a trial relating to insider dealing. Egan and the Special Casework team acted for Sappal on a private basis in one of the rare cases brought by the FCA for insider dealing. The prosecution alleged that the 3 defendants were involved in a plan to make illegal profits from share dealing on secret information obtained by an insider on the board at Logica, a multinational IT and management consultant agency, shortly before the business was the subject of a takeover by CGI Group Holdings Ltd, netting the defendants massive profits. Sappal was acquitted by the jury, with his co-Defendants sentenced.
- Giorgina Ray, Jimmy Savile's love child.
- Egan also represented Tania Clarence, a wife of an investment banker, in her defence to a charge of murder in connection with the deaths of her three disabled children. Clarence family friends said the mother had felt under constant pressure by local authority and had been “very derogatory about Kingston social services”. Speaking after the trial, Clarence said "lessons need to be learned" from his wife's story of "dedication and love" which turned to "despair and utter hopelessness". After the trial, in a statement issued on Clarence' behalf, Egan blamed medical professionals and social services for contributing to Tania Clarence's depression.
- In another widely publicised case Egan represented Pervez Rafiq, British charity worker who was the only defendant acquitted in a trial relating to terrorism offences. Egan led Tuckers Solicitors Terrorist and Special Casework team who have secured the acquittal of Rafiq who was accused of terrorist offences whilst Syed Hoque and Mashoud Miah were both convicted of funding terrorism. Hoque was found guilty of using aid convoys to smuggle money to his nephew fighting with an al-Qaida linked group
- In 2019, Egan represented Jack Shepherd who was convicted of a speedboat murder.

== Television and Media appearances ==
Egan has appeared on multiple national news television programs to provide legal commentary, including "The Briefs", series which were aired on ITV in July 2013. The series gathered an audience of about 2.4 million viewers during the first show.

=== On-air commentary ===
In 2014, Egan has appeared as a guest on 107.8 Radio Jackie commenting on Tania Clarence case.

== Awards ==
In 2003, Egan was received Legal Aid Lawyer of the Year Award in recognition for successful defence of Lotfi Raissi who was wrongly accused of being the architect of the September 11th atrocities. In 2015, Egan was named Partner of the Year at The Lawyer awards.

== See also ==
- Defence lawyers
- Advocates
