= Freeway Airport =

Coordinates: 38°56′29″N 076°46′21″W

- IATA: none; ICAO: none; FAA LID: W00

Summary
- Airport type: Private
- Owner: Freeway Airport Inc.
- Serves: Mitchellville, Maryland
- Location: Mitchellville, Maryland, US
- Elevation AMSL: 168 ft (51 m)
- Website: http://freewayaviation.com/

Map
- Location of airport in Maryland W00 (the United States)

Runways
Direction	Length		Surface
Direction	ft	m	Surface
18/36	2,420	738	Asphalt

Statistics (2023)
- Aircraft operations (year ending 8/9/2023): 32,115
- Source: Federal Aviation Administration

Freeway Airport (FAA LID: W00) is a privately owned airport located in Mitchellville, Prince George's County, Maryland, United States. It has Cessna 172s and a PA28R-200 IFR available to rent.

== History ==
Freeway Airport became active in June 1961, in Prince George's County, 2 miles NW of Mitchellville, Maryland. It has maintained an active flight school operation since its founding.

Hani Hanjour, one of the hijackers involved in the events of September 11, 2001, attempted to rent an aircraft at Freeway Airport after claiming to be qualified to do so. A month before the attack, "instructors at Freeway Airport in Bowie flew with him and deemed him unfit to rent a plane by himself".

== Crashes and incidents ==
In February 2006, a Cessna 172 crashed at Freeway Airport due to poor visibility.

On September 3, 2013, a Mooney M20 had crashed while taking off from runway 36. The three people on board were badly injured.

On September 12, 2019, a small Mooney plane (N202JB) crashed on U.S. Route 50, striking a car. Two people aboard the plane suffered minor injuries but did not seek medical attention at a hospital, and two people in the car suffered minor injuries.
