= Rayed Mohammed Abdullah Ali =

Saudi pilot

Rayed Mohammed Abdullah Ali (born 1978) is a Saudi Arabian student pilot, notable for having been deported from New Zealand in 2006 after it was realised that he had lived and trained in the United States with Hani Hanjour, one of the hijacking pilots in the 11 September 2001 attacks.

== Time in New Zealand ==
Ali entered New Zealand in February 2006 on a student visa, saying his dream was to become a commercial airline pilot and that he needed an English language qualification to assist. He then moved to Auckland to learn English and then moved to Palmerston North to fly at the Manawatu Aero Club. He told the Palmerston North flight school that he had obtained his private pilot's certificate in the United States and spent several years there before returning to Saudi Arabia to work in his father's textile business. He wanted to pass the International English Language Testing System (IELTS) exam so he could return home to train for his commercial pilot's licence.

On 29 May 2006, New Zealand authorities raided Ali's Palmerston North home, and on 30 May he was deported back to Saudi Arabia under escort. On 10 June 2006 the New Zealand government released a statement saying that Ali was deported because he "posed a threat to national security" and confirmed that he had lived and trained in Phoenix, Arizona, US, with fellow Saudi Hani Hanjour in the months leading up to the 11 September 2001 attacks.

== Section 72 ==
It was only the second time that section 72 of the New Zealand Immigration Act has been used to deport someone. Its use requires the consent of the Governor-General, and there is no right of appeal. It was used for the deportation of Soviet spy Anvar Kadyrov, a former KGB operative who was apprehended by New Zealand authorities in 1991 while attempting to obtain a New Zealand passport using a copy of a birth certificate of a deceased. Section 72 provides that where the Immigration Minister certifies that the continued presence in New Zealand of a person constitutes a threat to national security, the Governor-General may, by order in council, order that person's deportation.

== Rayed Ali's connections ==
New Zealand Immigration Minister David Cunliffe said that Ali "was directly associated with persons responsible for the terrorist attacks in the United States on Sept. 11, 2001" He also quoted excerpts from the U.S. government's 9/11 Commission Report on the attacks regarding Rayed Mohammed Abdullah Ali. The report says Ali lived and trained in Phoenix, Arizona with Hani Hanjour, the Saudi Arabian who have piloted Flight 77 into the Pentagon, on 11 September 2001. Abdullah was a leader at the Islamic Cultural Center in Phoenix where, the FBI says, he "reportedly gave extremist speeches at the mosque". Immigration Minister David Cunliffe also said that he could not comment on what happened after Ali returned to Saudi Arabia nor could he comment on what information he had on him or where it came from. "We're satisfied he is the right man."

Flight instructors at the Manawatu Aero Club say Ali wore a baseball cap, smart shirts and baggy trousers and favoured burgers and fries over halal food. One of the instructors, Captain Singh, a former Indian Air Force officer trained in intelligence, who accompanied Ali on several flights in a Cessna 152 aircraft, says Ali had a Yemeni passport and he was naturally suspicious at first. "At the time of September 11 he would have been in the US. I asked him some very direct questions about his US flying experience and found he was quite intelligent and a moderate person. He was not at all fundamentalist - he was against those people." "I found his standard to be very good", "He wanted to fly in Saudi Arabia or the [Arab] Emirates and was doing instrument training in the US before September 11 but said that since then everyone had treated him suspiciously. I'm 99 per cent sure he was genuine."

Ali told Captain Singh he was born and raised in Saudi Arabia but travelled on a Yemeni passport because his father was from Yemen and Saudi Arabia had refused to give him citizenship. When he returned to Palmerston North, he told Captain Singh he had missed an application deadline and been unable to sit the IELTS exam in Auckland. He planned to re-apply in Palmerston North for the IELTS course, where it was cheaper to fly than in Auckland.

== The tip off ==
On 13 July 2006, the New Zealand Herald newspaper reported that New Zealand's security agencies discovered the identity of Rayed Mohammad Abdullah Ali after a tip off from Ardmore Flying School, which is approximately 20 kilometres south of the Auckland CBD.

The New Zealand Herald reported: "A month later, on April 12, Ali visited Ardmore Flying School and attempted to enroll in a flying course - an action which school general manager Craig Hunter believes may have been the beginning of the end of Ali's time in New Zealand. The school would not let Ali fly as he did not want to follow rules established to protect overseas student." "He was not the least bit interested in complying with the rules, in terms of we would have made him pay a third of his total fee and he would have been granted an eight-month visa and we would have made him reapply for a student visa with the Ardmore Flying School as his training provider", the Herald reported.

Prime Minister Helen Clark defended her government's decision to deport Ali, "When you have someone who clearly has been a close associate of a terrorist who took a plane into the Pentagon, it's clearly not useful to be providing them with pilot training in New Zealand".
