= Hani Hanjour =

Saudi terrorist and 9/11 hijacker (1972–2001)

- هاني حنجور
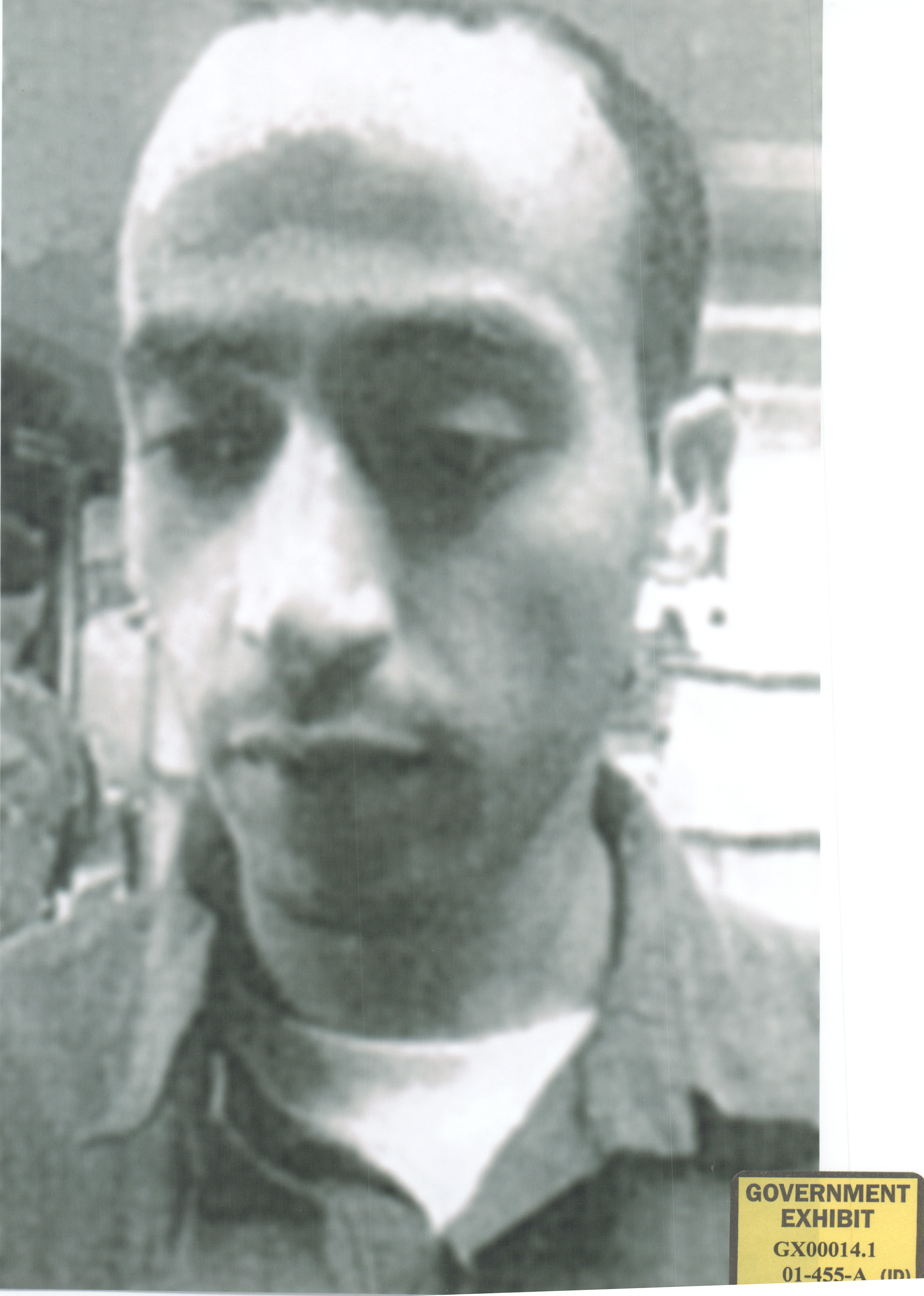
- Hanjour at an ATM on September 5, 2001
- Born: Hani Salih Hasan Hanjour; August 30, 1972; Taif, Saudi Arabia
- Died: September 11, 2001 (aged 29); Arlington County, Virginia, U.S.
- Cause of death: Suicide by plane crash against the Pentagon during the September 11 attacks
- Education: University of Arizona
- Known for: Hijacking American Airlines Flight 77 during the September 11 attacks
- Height: 5 ft 6 in (1.68 m)
- Allegiance: al-Qaeda
- Accomplices: Nawaf al-Hazmi, Khalid al-Mihdhar, Majed Moqed, and Salem al-Hazmi

Details
- Victims: 184 (not including himself and four other hijackers)
- Date: September 11, 2001; 9:37 a.m. (EDT)
- Locations: Arlington County, Virginia, United States
- Target: The Pentagon
- Injured: 106
- Weapons: Boxcutters; Hijacked Boeing 757-223

Hani Salih Hasan Hanjour (Arabic: هاني صالح حسن حنجور, romanized: Hānī Ṣāliḥ Ḥasan Ḥanjūr; August 30, 1972 – September 11, 2001) was a Saudi terrorist and member of al-Qaeda. Hanjour was the hijacker-pilot of American Airlines Flight 77, crashing the plane into the Pentagon as part of the September 11 attacks in 2001.

Hanjour first went to the United States in 1991, studying English for less than two months at the University of Arizona before returning to Saudi Arabia early the next year. He returned to the United States in 1996, studying English in California before he began taking flying lessons in Florida and then Arizona. He received his commercial pilot certificate in 1999, and went back to his native Saudi Arabia to find a job as a commercial pilot. Hanjour applied to civil aviation school in Jeddah, but was turned down. Hanjour left his family in late 1999, telling them that he would be traveling to the United Arab Emirates to find work. According to Khalid Sheikh Mohammed, Osama bin Laden or Mohammed Atef identified Hanjour at an Afghanistan training camp as a trained pilot and selected him to participate in the 11 September attacks.

Hanjour arrived in the United States again in December 2000. He joined up with Nawaf al-Hazmi in San Diego. They immediately left for Arizona, where Hanjour engaged in refresher pilot training. In April 2001, they relocated to Falls Church, Virginia, and then Paterson, New Jersey, in late May where Hanjour took additional flight training.

Hanjour returned to the Washington, D.C., metropolitan area on September 2, 2001, checking into a motel in Laurel, Maryland. On 11 September, Hanjour boarded American Airlines Flight 77, took control of the aircraft after his team of hijackers helped subdue the pilots, passengers, and crew, and flew the plane into the Pentagon as part of the 11 September attacks. The crash killed all 64 occupants on board the aircraft and 125 people in the Pentagon.

While in Florida and Arizona, Hanjour befriended and trained with Rayed Mohammed Abdullah Ali, a fellow Saudi Arabian who emigrated to Manawatū-Whanganui in 2006 to train as a pilot. He was deported from his Palmerston North home after his links to Hanjour were exposed.

== Early life and education ==
Hanjour was one of seven children, born to a food-supply businessman in Ta'if, Saudi Arabia. During his youth, Hanjour wanted to drop out of school to become a flight attendant, although his brother Abdulrahman discouraged this route, and tried to help him focus on his studies.

According to his eldest brother, Hanjour traveled to Afghanistan in the late 1980s as a teenager to participate in the conflict against the Soviet Union. The Soviets had already withdrawn by the time he arrived in the country and he instead worked for a relief agency.

== Career ==
=== Early 1990s ===
Hanjour was the first to arrive in the United States, much earlier than other hijackers. Hanjour arrived in Tucson, Arizona on 3 October 1991 from Saudi Arabia by way of New York, to study English at the University of Arizona's Center for English as a Second Language (ESL). Hanjour's eldest brother Abdulrahman helped him apply for the eight-week English program and found a room for Hanjour in a three-bedroom home on the corner of 4th Avenue and 4th Street near the Islamic Center of Tucson. He returned to Saudi Arabia in February 1992. Hanjour was the only hijacker to visit the United States prior to any intentions for a large-scale attack and was not linked to the Hamburg cell in Germany, which composed of the three hijackers who were taking flight lessons to become pilots. He was the first to receive a license out of the three other men, most likely due to arriving to the U.S. prior to the preparations for the attacks.

Over the next five years, Hanjour remained in Saudi Arabia, helping the family manage a lemon and date farm near Ta'if. His family often reminded Hanjour that he was getting past the age where he ought to get married and start a family, but Hanjour insisted he wanted to settle down more. While in Saudi Arabia, Hanjour applied for a job with Saudi Arabian Airlines, but was turned down due to poor grades. The airline told Hanjour they would consider him if he obtained a commercial pilot's license in the United States.

=== 1996 ===
In April 1996, Hanjour returned to the United States, staying with family friends, Susan and Adnan Khalil, in Miramar, Florida, for a month before heading to Oakland, California, to study English and attend flight school. (Note: Hanjour obtained a visa in March 1996, and arrived in the United States on 2 April 1996. "Staff Monograph on 9/11 and Terrorist Travel" (PDF). 9/11 Commission. 2004.) Hanjour was admitted to the Sierra Academy of Aeronautics, but before beginning flight training, the academy arranged for Hanjour to take intensive English courses at ESL Language Center in Oakland. The flight school also arranged for Hanjour to stay with a host family, with whom he moved in on 20 May 1996. Hanjour completed the English program in August, and in early September 1996, he attended a single day of ground school courses at the Sierra Academy of Aeronautics before withdrawing, citing financial worries about the $35,000 cost.

Hanjour left Oakland in September and moved to Tucson, Arizona, paying $4,800 for lessons at CRM Flight Cockpit Resource Management. Receiving poor marks, Hanjour dropped out of flight school, and returned to Saudi Arabia at the end of November 1996.

=== Late 1990s ===
Hanjour re-entered the United States on 15 November 1997, taking additional English courses in Florida, then returning to Tucson, where he shared an apartment with Bandar al-Hazmi near the University of Arizona, where he enrolled.

After arriving in Florida in November 1997, Hanjour met a man Rayed Mohammed Abdullah Ali, a mutual friend through Bandar al-Hazmi. Al-Hamzi had suggested that Ali train to be a pilot in Florida. Hanjour and Ali subsequently trained together both in Florida and Arizona, and became friends. Ali was a leader at the Islamic Cultural Centre in Tucson where, the FBI says, he "reportedly gave extremist speeches at the mosque". This, however, was disputed by a mosque staff member, who told the New Zealand Herald in June 2006 that Ali "was never a leader for the mosque and he never gave speeches at the mosque".

The 9/11 Commission Report reported that Abdullah attended the same Phoenix flight school as Hanjour and records show the pair used a flight simulator together on 23 June 2001. Ali later emigrated to New Zealand, where he settled in Auckland and then in Palmerston North to train as a pilot. He was identified as a friend and colleague of Hanjour in July 2006, less than six months after he first arrived in New Zealand. Immigration Minister David Cunliffe said that Ali "was directly associated with persons responsible for the terrorist attacks in the United States on Sept. 11, 2001".

In December, he resumed training at CRM Flight Cockpit Resource Management for a few weeks, before pursuing training at Arizona Aviation. Bandar al-Hazmi and Hanjour stayed in Arizona, continued taking flight lessons at Arizona Aviation throughout 1998 and early 1999. After moving out of Bandar's place in March, Hanjour lived in several apartments in Tempe, Mesa and Phoenix. In February, financial records showed that Hanjour had taken a trip to Las Vegas, Nevada. In addition to flight training at Arizona Aviation, Hanjour enrolled in flight simulator classes at the Sawyer School of Aviation where he made only three or four visits. Lotfi Raissi would begin taking lessons at the same school a month after Hanjour quit, part of what piqued the FBI's interest in Raissi.

An FBI informant named Aukai Collins claims he told the FBI about Hanjour's activities during 1998, giving them Hanjour's name and phone number, and warning them that more and more foreign-born Muslims seem to be taking flying lessons. The FBI admits it paid Collins to monitor the Islamic and Arab communities in Phoenix at the time, but denies Collins told them anything about Hanjour.

Hanjour gained his FAA commercial pilot certificate in April 1999, getting a "satisfactory" rating from the examiner. After receiving his commercial pilot certificate, Hanjour went on to train at other flight schools for more advanced flying. This caused concern among the instructors as they thought “he was so bad a pilot and spoke such poor English that they contacted the Federal Aviation Administration to verify that his license was not a fake.” The FAA verified his license and offered to provide him with English language tutors. Hanjour's bank records indicate that he travelled to Ontario, Canada, in March 1999 for an unknown reason.

He traveled to Saudi Arabia to get a job working with Saudi Arabian Airlines as a commercial pilot but was rejected by a civil aviation school in Jeddah. His brother, Yasser, relayed that Hanjour, frustrated, "turned his attention toward religious texts and cassette tapes of militant Islamic preachers." He told his family in late 1999 he was heading to the United Arab Emirates to find work. However, it is likely that he headed to al-Qaeda training camps in Afghanistan. He was known by al-Qaeda as Urwa al-Taa'ifi.

=== 2000 ===
In May 2000, a third person accompanied Nawaf al-Hazmi and Khalid al-Mihdhar to Sorbi's Flying Club where he waited on the ground as they took a flight lesson. It has been theorized this may have been Hanjour.

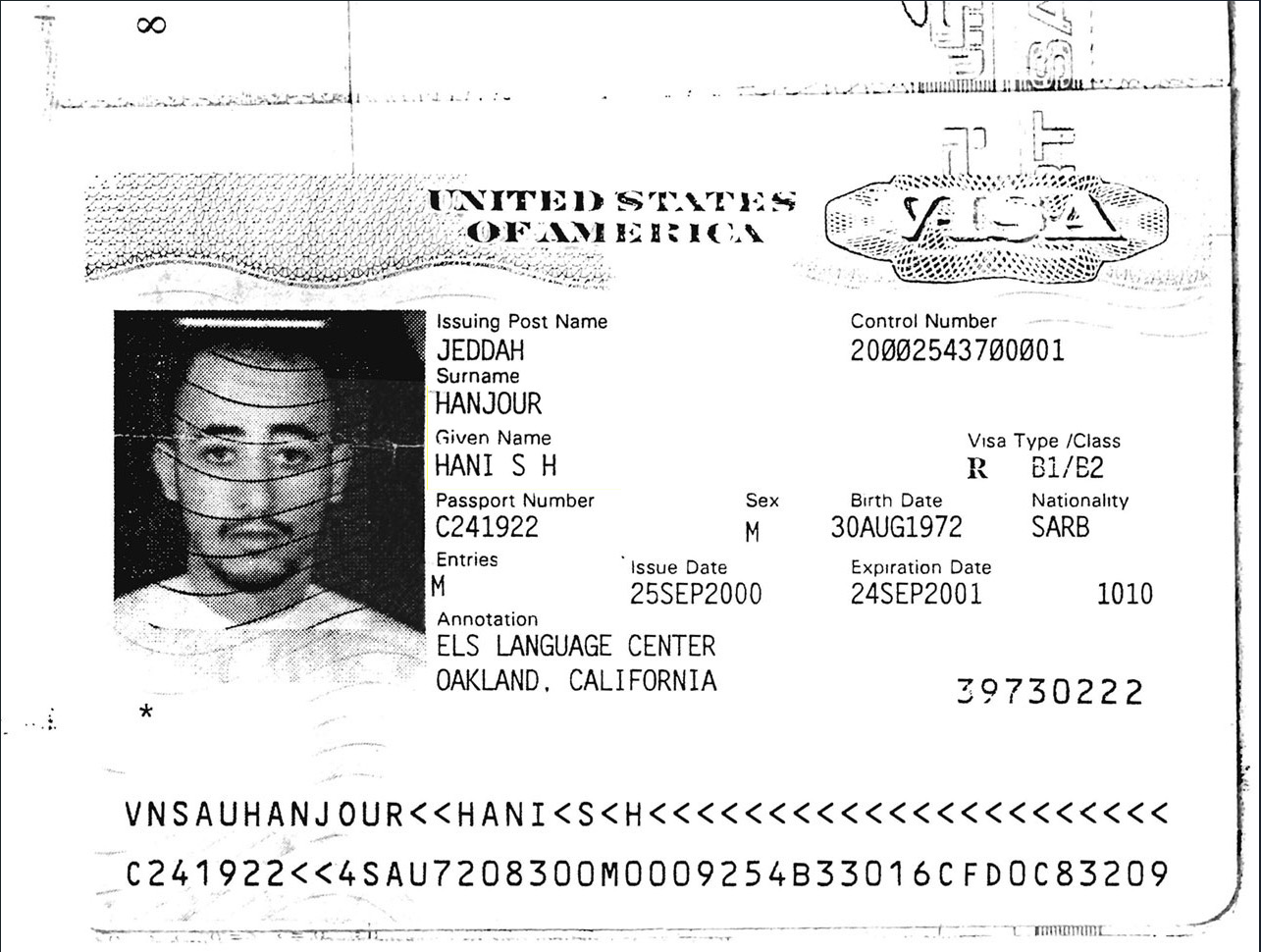
Hanjour's U.S. visa

In September Hanjour again sent his $110 registration to the ELS Language Center, which leased space on Holy Names College campus in Oakland, California, to continue his English studies. He also applied for another U.S. student visa. Although he was accepted, after the attacks, it would be reported that his visa application was 'suspicious'. Granted an F-1 student visa in Jeddah, Saudi Arabia, on 25 September 2000, he failed to reveal that he had previously traveled to the U.S. He never turned up for classes at the ELS Language Center, and when the school contacted its Saudi representative, he reported that he could not find Hanjour either.

On 5 December, Hanjour opened a CitiBank account in Deira, Dubai. On 8 December, Hanjour was recorded flying into the Cincinnati/Northern Kentucky International Airport, and is thought to have met with Nawaf al-Hazmi in San Diego shortly thereafter.

=== 2001 ===
Hanjour’s Virginia identification card

Hanjour came back to San Diego in December 2000, frequently visiting Abdussattar Shaikh's house, which was shared with Nawaf al-Hazmi and Khalid al-Mihdhar. During this time Hanjour may have visited the San Diego Zoo in February, as a security guard recalls having to page his name to reclaim a lost briefcase containing cash and Arabic documents and later recognized his photograph. Shortly afterwards, the three hijackers moved out of Shaikh's house to Falls Church, Virginia.

The ELS Language Center at Oakland University said Hanjour reached a level of proficiency sufficient to "survive very well in the English language". However, in January 2001, Arizona JetTech flight school managers reported him to the FAA at least five times because his English was inadequate for the commercial pilot certificate he had already obtained. It took him five hours to complete an oral exam meant to last just two hours, said Peggy Chevrette. Hanjour failed UA English classes with a 0.26 GPA and a JetTech manager said "He could not fly at all." The certificate was a requirement for him to join the Saudi Arabian pilot's academy. His FAA certificate had become invalid late in 1999 when he failed to take a mandatory medical examination. In February, Hanjour began advanced simulator training in Mesa, Arizona.

He and al-Hazmi moved out of Mesa at the end of March, and they were in Falls Church, Virginia, by 4 April. Falls Church was the location of the Dar al-Hijrah mosque in the Washington, D.C., metropolitan area. Anwar Al-Awlaki was the recently appointed new Imam whom al-Hazmi had met with in San Diego.

At the mosque, Hanjour and al-Hazmi soon met Eyad Alrababah, a Jordanian who later pleaded guilty to document fraud and was deported. They had told him that they were looking for an apartment to rent, and he found a friend who rented them an apartment in Alexandria where they stayed. On 4 April 2001, Hanjour asked to forward his utility deposits to 3159 Row Street, Falls Church, Virginia, which was the same address as the mosque.

When police raided the Hamburg apartment of Ramzi bin al-Shibh (the "20th hijacker") while investigating the 9/11 attacks, Awlaki's telephone number was found among bin al-Shibh's personal contact information.

On 2 May 2001, two new roommates joined them in Virginia: Majed Moqed and Ahmed al-Ghamdi, both of whom had just flown into the United States from the Middle East.

Alrababah later suggested they all go together to look at apartments in Fairfield, Connecticut. On 8 May, Alrababah, Hanjour, al-Hazmi, Moqed, and al-Ghamdi traveled to Fairfield to look for housing. While there, they also called several local flight schools. They then travelled briefly to Paterson to look at that area as well. Rababah has contended that, after this trip, he never saw any of the men again.

Sometime at the end of May 2001, Hanjour rented a one-bedroom apartment in Paterson, New Jersey. He lived there with at least one roommate and was visited by several other hijackers, including Mohamed Atta. During his time in New Jersey, he and al-Hazmi rented three different cars including a sedan in June that Hanjour cosigned with the alias "Hani Saleh Hassan". He later made his last phone call to his family back in Saudi Arabia, during which he claimed to be phoning from a payphone in the United Arab Emirates, where he was supposedly still working.

Hanjour, along with at least five other future hijackers, are believed to have traveled to Las Vegas several times in mid-2001, where they allegedly drank alcohol, gambled, and visited lap dancing clubs.

On 20 July, Hanjour flew to the Montgomery County Airpark in Maryland from New Jersey on a practice flight with fellow hijacker Nawaf al-Hazmi.

On 1 August, Hanjour and al-Mihdhar returned to Falls Church to obtain fraudulent documentation at a 7-Eleven convenience store where an illegal side business operated for such a service. There they met Luis Martinez-Flores, himself also an illegal immigrant, who agreed to help them for a $100 fee. They drove together to a DMV office at a mall in nearby Springfield, Virginia, where Martinez-Flores gave them a false address in Falls Church to use, and signed legal forms attesting that they lived there. Hanjour and al-Mihdhar were then granted state identity cards. (Martinez-Flores was later sentenced to 21 months in prison for aiding them, and giving false testimony to police.) On that same day, Hanjour was stopped by police for driving a Toyota Corolla 55 mph (89 km/h) in a 30 mph (48 km/h) zone in Arlington, Virginia, for which he paid a $70 fine.

Employees at Advance Travel Service in Totowa, New Jersey later claimed that Moqed and Hanjour had both purchased tickets there. They claimed that Hanjour spoke very little English, and Moqed did most of the speaking. Hanjour requested a seat in the front row of the airplane. Their credit card failed to authorize, and after being told the agency did not accept personal checks, the pair left to withdraw cash. They returned shortly afterwards and paid the $1,842.25 total in cash.

Hanjour began making cross-country flights in August to test security, and tried to rent a plane from Freeway Airport in Maryland; though he was declined after exhibiting difficulty controlling and landing a single-engine Cessna 172. He moved out of his New Jersey apartment on 1 September, and was photographed four days later using an ATM with fellow hijacker Majed Moqed in Laurel, Maryland, where all five Flight 77 hijackers had purchased a 1-week membership in a local Gold's Gym. There, Hanjour claimed that his first name translated as warrior when a gym employee asked if there was an English translation of their Arabic names. (Hani actually translates as "contented.")

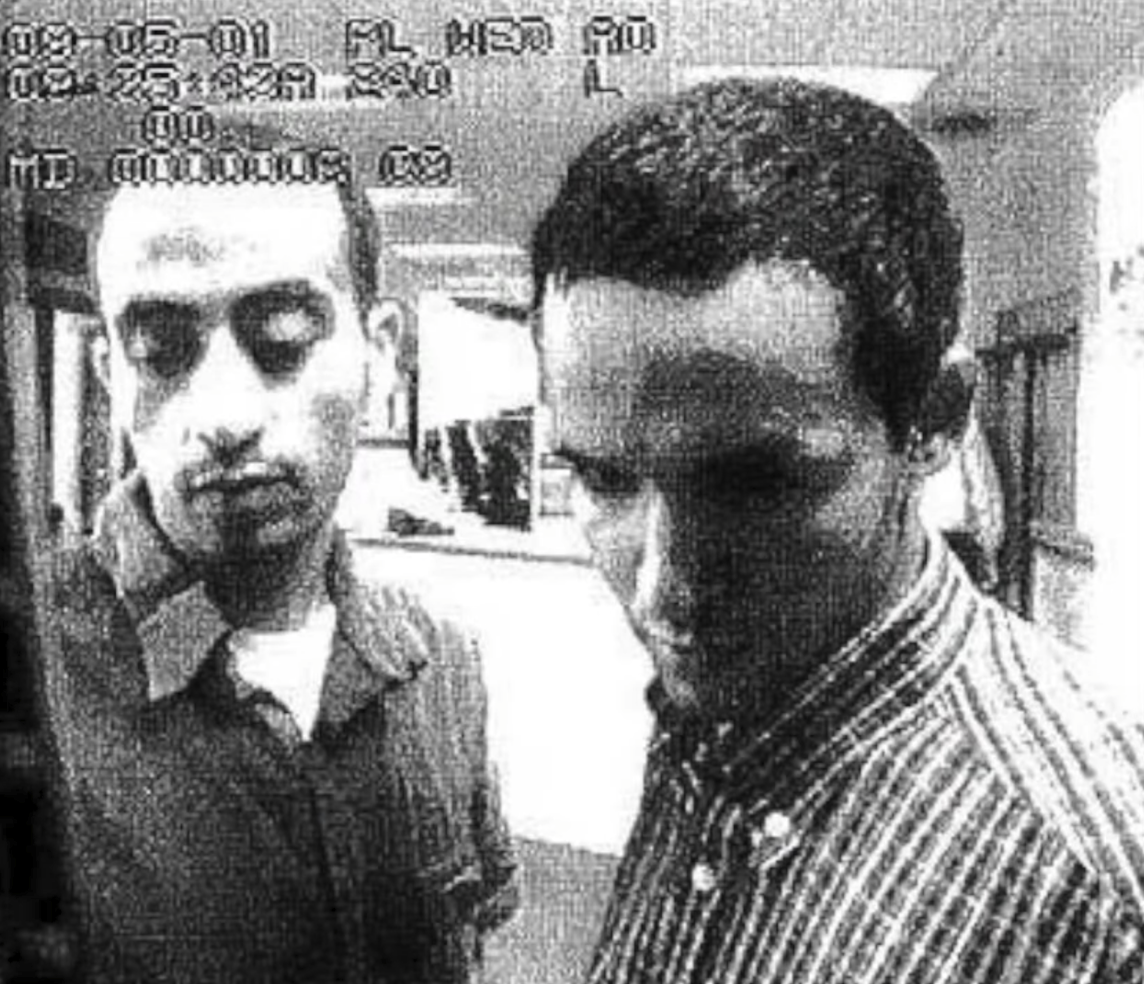
Hanjour, along with Majed Moqed, who helped hijack the plane, on September 5, 2001, on CCTV footage

On 10 September 2001, Hanjour, al-Mihdhar, and al-Hazmi checked into the Marriott Residence Inn in Herndon, Virginia where Saleh Ibn Abdul Rahman Hussayen, a prominent Saudi government official, was staying. No evidence was ever uncovered that they had met, or knew of each other's presence.

== 9/11 attacks and death ==
At 7:35 a.m. on September 11, 2001, Hanjour arrived at the passenger security checkpoint at Washington Dulles International Airport, 26 miles (42 km) west of Washington, D.C., en route to board American Airlines Flight 77.

Some earlier reports stated he may not have had a ticket or appeared on any manifest, however he was documented by the 9/11 Commission as having been assigned to seat 1B in first class, and reported to have bought a single first-class ticket from Advance Travel Service in Totowa. In the security tape footage released in 2004, Hanjour appears to walk through the metal detector without setting it off, which likely means that agents at the terminal were not looking at any warning signal that indicated if he had weapons. With this, it allowed Hanjour to board Flight 77 without any authorization.

At 9:37 AM, Hani Hanjour crashed American Airlines Flight 77 into the Pentagon, the crash was captured on security footage.

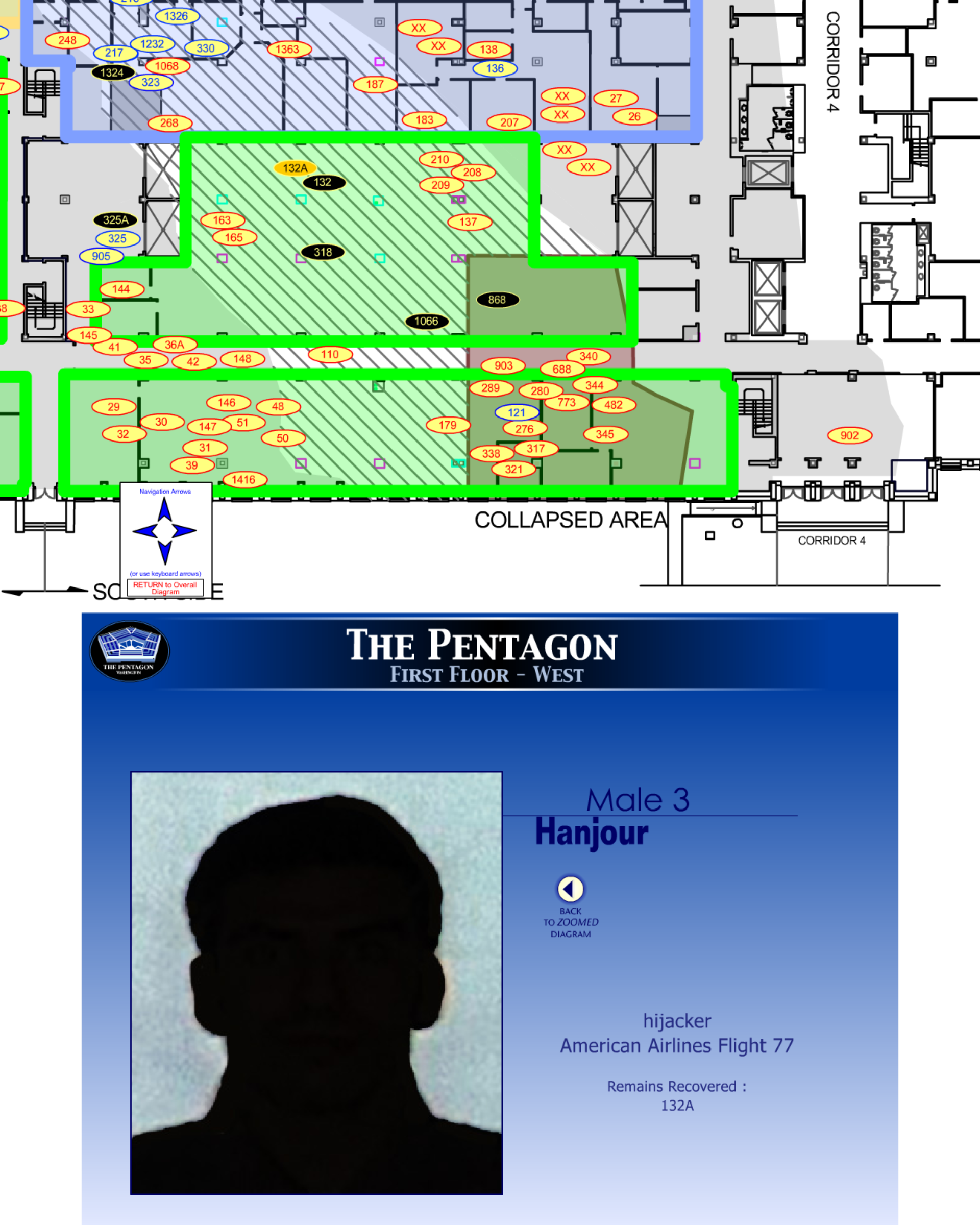
Information about the recovery of Hanjour's remains (132A) from a Moussaoui trial presentation. It is unclear how they identified "Male 3" as Hanjour.

The flight was scheduled to depart at 8:10, but ended up departing 10 minutes late from Gate D26 at Dulles. The last normal radio communications from the aircraft to air traffic control occurred at 08:50:51. At 08:54, Flight 77 began to deviate from its normal, assigned flight path and turned south, and then hijackers set the flight's autopilot heading for Washington, D.C. Passenger Barbara Olson called her husband, United States Solicitor General Ted Olson, and reported that the plane had been hijacked and that the assailants had box cutters and knives. Using the flight intercom, Hanjour announced the flight was hijacked. As Flight 77 was 5 miles (8.0 km) west-southwest of the Pentagon, it made a 330-degree turn. At the end of the turn, it was descending through 2,200 feet (670 m), pointed toward the Pentagon and downtown Washington. Hanjour advanced the throttles to maximum power and dove towards the Pentagon at a speed of over 530 mph (850 km/h). At 09:37:46, Hanjour crashed the Boeing 757 into the west façade of the Pentagon, killing himself and all 63 passengers and 6 crew members aboard along with 125 on the ground in the Pentagon. While level above the ground and seconds from the crash, the airplane's wings knocked over light poles and its right engine smashed into a power generator, creating a smoke trail seconds before smashing into the Pentagon. In the recovery process at the Pentagon, remains of all five Flight 77 hijackers were identified through a process of elimination, as not matching any DNA samples for the victims, and put into custody of the FBI.

=== Family denial ===
After the September 11 attacks, Hanjour's family in Saudi Arabia vehemently stated that they could not, and would not, believe he had been involved as one of the hijacker pilots, and also stated that he had phoned them just eight hours prior to the hijackings and his voice did not sound strange or unusual at all.

== In popular culture ==
- Afghan-Canadian actor Qaseem Gul portrayed Hani Hanjour in the Canadian TV series Mayday Season 16: Episode 2 (2016) called "9/11: The Pentagon Attack" and Air Crash Investigation Special Report Season 2: Episode 1 (2019) called "Headline News".

== See also ==
- Rayed Mohammed Abdullah Ali
- PENTTBOM
- Hijackers in the 11 September attacks
