= Eric Hunsader =

American software developer

Eric Scott Hunsader is an American software developer, the founder and CEO of Nanex.

Hunsader grew up in Manatee County, Florida, the son of a tomato farmer father, and the second eldest of four children.

Hunsader is a leading critic of high-frequency trading (HFT).

Before he founded Nanex in 2000, he was a senior software engineer with Quote.com.

In February 2016, the Securities and Exchange Commission (SEC) awarded him $750,000 in respect of his activities as a whistleblower, which led to a $5 million fine against the NYSE.

He works in Winnetka, Illinois.
