= Armin S. =

German securities trader (b. 1976/1977)

Armin S. (complete name unknown, born 1976 or 1977) is a German independent securities trader. He achieved international recognition in 2017 when he filed a lawsuit against BNP Paribas for its continued refusal to deliver €163 million in securities he had purchased in December 2015, one of the largest civil cases brought by a private investor in Germany.

== Career ==
Armin S. started his career as a trader at the German WestLB Investment boutique. Afterwards he worked eight years at Citigroup on the trading floor.

Subsequently, he set up his own office to trade for his own account. Armin S. compared his job with the work of a used car dealer, constantly buying and selling shares of stock in a corporation, or securities representing other financial instruments, making his margin on the bid–ask spread, the difference between the selling price and buying price. He tracks the high-speed changes in these prices through a computer program, which alerts him to changes in the bid–ask spread of a share or security, and the computer can even submit purchase orders for these based on criteria he has included in the program. This focus on short term moves of bid–ask spreads means that he isn't researching the underlying long-term expectations for a specific company, nor even necessarily the underlying components that make up a security. For example, the security he purchased that led to his €163 million lawsuit against BNP Paribas was only known to him as DE000AA2GDQ0, with no further information identifying what the security actually represented, but his program identified it as having a bid–ask spread worthy of a purchase.

== Lawsuits filed against BNP Paribas ==
In June 2016, the German magazine Focus was the first to publish an article regarding a December 2015 erroneous trade of €163m allegedly involving BNP Paribas Arbitrage. The bank had sold 3,000 units of a security to the then-38-year-old Armin S. at BNP's posted price of €108.80 per unit, totaling €326,400, but the true price should have been €54,312 per unit, valuing the securities at €163 million, according to BNP. The error had gone unnoticed by BNP for several days, and BNP had even reconfirmed sale to Armin S. at the €108.80 per unit price. The prevailing erroneous trade rules allowed any such trades greater than €20,000 to be canceled as late as 11 a.m. of the next trading day; as the trade had occurred on Friday 4 December 2015, BNP had until 11 a.m. on Monday 7 December 2015, but did not try to cancel until 15 December 2015 – the seventh trading day after BNP's erroneous trade. The lawyer for Armin S., Mario Bögelein, stated that a bank not recognizing an error of this magnitude should not be protected by law.

In September 2016, Armin S. commented on his case in the German magazine AnlegerPlus, questioning the breaches on the risk-management side of BNP.

On 19 May 2017, Armin S. filed an initial €1 million civil suit against BNP in Frankfurt District Court, believing that a decision by the court in favor of his position could then confirm that BNP must pay the remainder, while avoiding the significant legal cost of his losing a full €163 million civil suit. He stated that he would refile with a €152 million suit if BNP were to drag the case into Germany's Federal Court of Justice – the largest civil case by one individual in German history.

On 5 July 2017, Armin S. commented that the lawsuit would not have been necessary if, in 2015, BNP had simply acknowledged that it had made a mistake and had also broken the erroneous trade rules, then tried to negotiate a settlement on the €163 million trade. He reemphasized that the third largest bank in Europe, with (then) €42 billion in gross annual income, should have trading systems and risk management that actually works, rather than simply relying on "arrogance... They think they're the best and smartest — which they often are — but as soon as something goes against them, they ignore you."

In July 2017, after Armin S. filed his lawsuit, Swiss-based lawyer and financial controller Michael Lusk wrote an article questioning "Do banks' internal control systems work?", and discussing how Armin S. had approached the Federal Financial Supervisory Authority (BaFin) of Germany, as well as the European Central Bank (ECB), to highlight that BNP put the German and European financial systems at risk by not spotting the mistake in their risk management programs and thereby violated supervisory rules of the ECB.

In September 2018, Armin S. filed a €152 million lawsuit in BNP's home country of France. The applicable statute of limitations set a three-year deadline (4 December 2018) to file in France, and the German courts had not yet moved forward on his May 2017 lawsuit; in addition, this also allowed for the possibility of the German court ruling that Germany was not the relevant jurisdiction for the lawsuit, which indeed it did on 26 February 2019. Coincident with his filing in France, he increased his claim in the German District Court to €6 million, still concerned about the legal fees in Germany should he lose a full €163 million lawsuit.

== BNP trading and risk-management failures ==
On 11 March 2017, the French newspaper Les Echos published an article about the BNP error, which a member of the European Banking Authority immediately retweeted, commenting that it was "a concrete example of what is called "operational" risk in the banking sector".

In May 2017, Professor Hans-Peter Burghof, holder of the Chair of Banking and Financial Services in the Faculty of Business Administration at the University of Hohenheim, told Bloomberg News that BNP was the party with the "obligation to conduct its business properly", and had failed to do so.

In July 2017, a spokesperson for the Frankfurt Stock Exchange confirmed that their systems were set up to catch an erroneous trade within two hours, but was surprised that BNP, which executed the transaction over-the-counter (OTC) rather than through a stock exchange, had not set up its own systems to catch the €163 million error.

The Financial Times (FT) reported in March 2018 that internal documents from BNP Paribas (BNP) revealed that the error had not been detected because BNP forgot to book any of the trades it made in structured products in Germany from 2 December 2015 to 9 December 2015. The FT estimated that this included 8,500 trades BNP had made. It also questioned if BNP had followed the normal business protocol of hedging its financial positions if it did not even know what trades it had made. Armin S. is quoted: "BNP wants to rely on statutory safeguard clauses but on the other hand they ignored all control-tasks imposed by the regulators — ECB, BaFin and AMF — for a whole week".

== See also ==
- Erroneous trade (Mistrade)
- List of pseudonyms
- List of trading losses
