= Layering (finance) =

High-frequency trading strategy

Layering is a strategy in high-frequency trading where a trader makes and then cancels orders that they never intend to have executed in hopes of influencing the stock price. For instance, to buy stock at a lower price, the trader initially places orders to sell at or below the market ask price. This may cause the market's best ask price to fall as other market participants lower their asking prices because they perceive selling pressure as they see the sell orders being entered on the order book. The trader may place subsequent sell orders for the security at successively lower prices as the best ask price falls (to increase the appearance of selling interest). After the price has fallen sufficiently, the trader makes a real trade, buying the stock at the now lower best ask price, and cancels all the sell orders. It is considered a form of stock market manipulation.

== Instances ==
In 2011, British regulators fined Swift Trade £8 million for using the technique and the firm went out of business. The case drew a lot of attention as Swift Trade was a Canadian firm and it was one of the first cases of the Financial Services Authority fining foreign firms.

== See also ==
- Spoofing (finance)
