= Fat-finger error =

Keyboard input error

A fat-finger error is a keyboard input error or mouse misclick that occurs from a simple input mistake, causing unwanted secondary behavior. In common parlance, it simply refers to a common typographical error made on a touchscreen or physical keyboard that occurs when the wrong selection is made, or multiple selections are made due to options or keyboard keys being too close together.

In the context of financial markets, a fat finger error is specifically an instance where the details of a buy or sell order are mistakenly entered by a trader.

== In financial marketing ==
In the context of financial markets such as the stock market or foreign exchange market, a fat-finger error is an instance where an order to buy or sell is placed of far greater size than intended, for the wrong stock or contract, at the wrong price, or with any number of other input errors.

Automated systems within trading houses may catch fat-finger errors before they reach the market or such orders may be cancelled before they can be fulfilled. The larger the order, the more likely it is to be cancelled, as it may be an order larger than the amount of stock available in the market.

Fat-finger errors are a product of the electronic processing of orders which requires details to be input using keyboards. Before trading was computerised, erroneous orders were known as "out-trades" which could be cancelled before proceeding. Erroneous orders placed using computers may be harder or impossible to cancel.

=== Deadlines for review and cancellation ===
In order to have legal certainty at the stock exchange, all exchanges have tight deadlines to request a review and cancellation, if possible. At the NYSE, BATS, CBOT, NASDAQ, OMX and American Stock Exchange requests for review must be received "within thirty (30) minutes of execution time".

At the NYSE-Euronext Liffe (Paris, Brussels, Amsterdam), "Where a member has executed an Erroneous trade, he will have a maximum of 30 minutes from the time of execution within which he may contact Market Services to request an invalidation".

At the London Stock Exchange, "any requests from member firms to cancel trades should be made to the Market Supervision department as soon as possible and in any event within 30 minutes of the trade time".

At the Singapore Exchange, "the matter must be referred to SGX-ST within sixty (60) minutes from the time the error trade occurred".

The Frankfurt Stock Exchange in Germany applies the following rules: in case of transactions in securities traded in Continuous Auction, the Mistrade application shall be submitted within two trading hours upon receipt of the execution confirmation pursuant to § 2 Paragraph 1 Clause 2. As far as transactions of securities other than structured products, which are traded in Continuous Auction, are concerned, the application term ends according to Clause 1 upon closing of trading hours for that day, so the mistrade application has to be submitted "within half an hour after the closing of trading hours" at the latest.

=== Exclusion of rescission rights ===
In order to have legal certainty and in order to avoid the situation that courts have to decide ex-post if a trade should be binding or not, erroneous trade rules of exchanges usually exclude civil-law rescission rights.

This explains why banks usually have to carry huge losses when clearly erroneous trades occurred that have not been detected within 30 minutes.

=== Examples ===
Fat-finger errors are a regular occurrence in the financial markets:

- In 2001, UBS sold 610,000 Dentsu-shares at ¥6, instead of 6 Dentsu-shares at ¥610,000. Even though the error was spotted immediately, the Tokyo Stock Exchange did not cancel the trades and UBS had to buy back the shares at market-value which caused them a loss of US$100m.
- In 2006, a fat-finger error by a trader at Mizuho Securities in Japan caused the firm to short sell a stock in an error that cost the firm ¥40 billion to unwind.
- In 2014, a Japanese broker erroneously placed orders for more than US$600bn (£370bn) of stock in leading Japanese companies, including Nomura, Toyota Motors, and Honda, which were subsequently cancelled.
- In 2015, a junior employee at Deutsche Bank whose superior was on vacation confused gross and net amounts while processing a trade, causing a payment to a US hedge fund of US$6bn, orders of magnitude higher than the correct amount. The bank reported the error to the British Financial Conduct Authority, the European Central Bank and the US Federal Reserve Bank, and retrieved the money on the following day.
- In 2015, the investor Armin S. bought certificates from BNP Paribas at a price of €108 instead of €54,400 each. This caused a loss of €160m for BNP. The error was not detected because BNP failed to book more than 8000 trades for a whole week.
- In 2016, it was believed a fat-finger error caused the British pound to drop 6% in just a few minutes to US$1.1841, its lowest value for 31 years. A report by the Bank for International Settlements later concluded that the drop was not caused by a single factor.
- On 8 April 2018, in the 2018 Samsung fat-finger error the company erroneously issued new shares to employees in a stock ownership plan. The error disrupted the Korean finance market.
- In 2018, Deutsche Bank mistakenly transferred 28 billion euros to one of its outside accounts, more than the bank's market value.

== See also ==
- Flash crash
- Typographical error
