= Intermarket sweep order =

Intermarket sweep orders (ISO) is a type of stock market order that sweeps several different market centers and scoop up as many shares as possible from them all. These work against the order-protection rule under regulation NMS.

For example, if a trader is trying to buy 1000 shares of X, and there are 100 shares of X being offered at $1 at one exchange and 2000 at $1.10 at another exchange, the order protection rule would let you buy ONLY those 100 shares at $1, after which you would need to send in other orders. With the ISO, you can buy the 100 shares at $1 and the remaining 900 at $1.10 on the other exchange subsequently.
