= Account takeover =

Cyberattack

In computer security, an attacker performs an account takeover (ATO) to take control of a victim's user account, allowing the attacker to perform functions on the victim's behalf. Account takeover can be the result of theft of session tokens, credential stuffing, malware, insecure design of access controls, social engineering, or many other vulnerabilities.
