= Front running =

Prohibited financial transaction

Front running, also known as tailgating, is the practice of entering into an equity (stock) trade, option, futures contract, derivative, or security-based swap to capitalize on advance, nonpublic knowledge of a large ("block") pending transaction that will influence the price of the underlying security. In essence, it means the use of knowledge of an impending trade to engage in a personal or proprietary securities transaction in advance of that trade. Front running is considered a form of market manipulation in many markets. Cases typically involve individual brokers or brokerage firms trading stock in and out of undisclosed, unmonitored accounts of relatives or confederates. Institutional and individual investors may also commit a front-running violation when they are privy to inside information. For example, unscrupulous employees with access to their firm's order management system may engage in front running after observing consistent stock price movements in response to the firm's largest trades. To hide the scheme, the employees typically feed information about the victimized firm's upcoming orders to a third-party who places earlier orders for the same securities with different brokers. A front-running firm either buys for its own account before filling customer buy orders that drive up the price or sells for its own account before filling customer sell orders that drive down the price. Front running is prohibited since the front-runner's profits come from nonpublic information, at the expense of its own customers, the block trade, or the public market. In a large scheme the front-running orders may approach or even exceed the size of the victimized firm's orders, pushing the price away from the firm's target price before it has placed its first order.

In 2003, several hedge fund and mutual fund companies became embroiled in an illegal late trading scandal made public by a complaint against Bank of America brought by New York Attorney General Eliot Spitzer. A resulting US Securities and Exchange Commission investigation into allegations of front-running activity implicated Edward D. Jones & Co., Inc., Goldman Sachs, Morgan Stanley, Strong Mutual Funds, Putnam Investments, Invesco, and Prudential Securities.

Following interviews in 2012 and 2013, the FBI said front running had resulted in profits of $50 million to $100 million for the bank. Wall Street traders may have manipulated a key derivatives market by front running Fannie Mae and Freddie Mac.

In 2021 and 2022, the SEC charged three separate front running schemes discovered by its own data analysis. The largest of the three schemes discovered using the Consolidated Audit Trail was alleged to have generated ill-gotten gains of nearly $50 million.

The terms originate from the era when stock market trades were executed via paper carried by hand between trading desks. The routine business of hand-carrying client orders between desks would normally proceed at a walking pace, but a broker could literally run in front of the walking traffic to reach the desk and execute a personal account order immediately before a large client order. Likewise, a broker could tail behind the person carrying a large client order to be the first to execute immediately after. Such actions amount to a type of insider trading, since they involve non-public knowledge of upcoming trades, and the broker privately exploits this information by controlling the sequence of those trades to favor a personal position.

== Explanation ==
For example, suppose a broker receives a market order from a customer to buy a large block—say, 400,000 shares—of some stock, but before placing the order for the customer, the broker buys 20,000 shares of the same stock for their own account at $100 per share, then afterward places the customer's order for 400,000 shares, driving the price up to $102 per share and allowing the broker to immediately sell their shares for, say, $101.75, generating a significant profit of $35,000 in just a short time. This $35,000 is likely to be just a part of the additional cost to the customer's purchase caused by the broker's self-dealing.

This example uses unusually large numbers to get the point across. In practice, computer trading splits up large orders into many smaller ones, making front-running more difficult to detect. Moreover, the U.S. Securities and Exchange Commission's 2001 change to pricing stock in pennies, rather than fractions of no less than 1/8 of a dollar, facilitated front running by reducing the extra amount that must be offered to step in front of other orders.

By front-running, the broker has put his or her own financial interest above the customer's interest and is thus committing fraud. In the United States, they might also be breaking laws on market manipulation or insider trading.

== Other uses of the term ==
A third-party trader may find out the content of another broker's order and buy or sell in front of it in the same way that a self-dealing broker might. The third-party trader might find out about the trade directly from the broker or an employee of the brokerage firm in return for splitting the profits, in which case the front-running would be illegal. The trader might, however, only find out about the order by reading the broker's habits or tics, much in the same way that poker players can guess other players' cards. For very large market orders, simply exposing the order to the market, may cause traders to front-run as they seek to close out positions that may soon become unprofitable.

In insurance sales, front running is a practice in which agents "leak" information (usually false) to consumers about a competitor insurance company that leads the consumer to believe that the company's products or services are inferior, or worthless. The agent subsequently obtains a sale at the consumer's expense, earns a commission, and the consumer may have given up a perfectly good product for an inferior one as the result of the subterfuge.

"Front running" is sometimes used informally for a broker's tactics related to trading on proprietary information before its clients have been given the information. Analysts and brokers who buy shares in a company just before the brokerage firm is about to recommend the stock as a strong buy, are practicing this type of "front running". Brokers have been convicted of securities laws violations in the United States for such behavior. In 1985, a writer for the Wall Street Journal, R. Foster Winans, tipped off brokers about the content of his column "Heard on the Street", which, based upon publicly available information, would be written in such a way as to give either good or bad news about various stocks. The tipped-off brokers traded on the information. Winans and the brokers were prosecuted by the prosecutor Rudolph Giuliani, tried, and convicted of securities fraud. Their convictions were upheld by the United States Supreme Court in 1986.

== Recent cases ==
In July 2020 Ken Griffin's Citadel Securities was fined $700,000 for trading ahead of its clients from 2012 to 2014.

== See also ==
- Domain name front running
- Principal–agent problem (An economic theory applicable to front running, where stock brokers are agents, and brokerage clients are principals)
