= Tuckers Solicitors =

British law firm

Tuckers
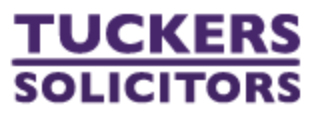
- No. of offices: 12
- No. of attorneys: Over 200
- Major practice areas: Criminal Defence
- Key people: Richard Egan; Barry Tucker; Jim Meyer; Franklin Sinclair; Phil Smith; Adrian Macho; Richard Harrold
- Date founded: 1980
- Company type: Limited Liability Partnership
- Website: Official website

Tuckers Solicitors LLP, known as Tuckers Solicitors, is a United Kingdom criminal defence law firm that has particular specialisation in serious crime, extradition, martial and military law, civil liberties, human rights, cyber crime and is one of the largest law firms headquartered in London. The firm featured in series of television shows about crime and disorder on national channels and has appeared on national news, commenting on various legal affairs.

== History ==
The firm was formed in 1980 by Barry Tucker, its founding partner, and from its earliest days it devoted much of its practise to criminal defence, although it has since diversified into a full-service law firm that provides legal advice to a wide range of clients across many practice areas including civil litigation and immigration. In the early 2010, the firm began to move away from pure legally aided criminal defence work towards private client, merging with other criminal practises around the country. It continued to expand throughout northern England and as far north as Manchester. By 2016, Tuckers have employed more than 200 lawyers in over 12 offices throughout London, Kent, Manchester and Birmingham.

== Mergers ==
Tuckers have continually been growing in size. In December 2013 they announced merger with Robin Murray & Co solicitors based in Kent, with the benefits to both firms coming through the sharing of resources and back-office functions, to lower practice costs. In September 2013, Tuckers had gone into partnership with Mulrooney Craghill, a Sussex-based criminal practice based near Brighton and Sussex which has kept its own name and format after the merger. In October 2016 Tuckers added Kent Defence Ltd based in Margate to their operation in Kent.

== Television appearances ==
In 2012, the firm featured in "The Briefs", ITV series which drew an audience of about 2.4 million viewers during the first show. The second show was up against the likes of Usain Bolt show with audience of nearly 3 million viewers.

== Practice areas ==
Tuckers Solicitors' practice areas include:

- Regulatory law
- Litigation & Advocacy
- Immigration
- Health and Safety
- Military Law & Courts Martial
- Fraud
- Civil Liberties
- Human Rights
- Confiscation, restraint and cash forfeiture

== Notable solicitors ==
- Richard Egan, senior partner at Tuckers, represented Syed Hoque who was found guilty of using aid convoys to smuggle money to his nephew fighting with an al-Qaida-linked group while his “fixer” Mashoud Miah, 28, from east London, was convicted on one count of helping Hoque get £1,500 to Syria. Pervez Rafiq was facing allegations of using convoys to provide financial and material support to extremists in Syria along with three others. It was alleged they were using aid convoys bound for Syria to transport money and items which would be used to commit terrorist offences. Rafiq, a prominent charity fundraiser had raised over £200,000 for charity organising humanitarian aid convoys. After a long trial at the Old Bailey Rafiq was acquitted. Two others, including Syed Hoque were convicted of involvement in funding terrorism.
- Franklin Sinclair, managing partner at Tuckers, has starred in ITV television series The Briefs. He has been described by TV Choice Magazine as Britain’s leading defense lawyer at one of UK’s biggest legal practices, whose clients include the likes of Wayne Rooney.
- Jim Meyer, senior partner at Tuckers, is a former president of the London Criminal Courts Solicitors Association and is regularly asked by criminal defence representative organisations to provide advice and contribute towards policy papers regarding criminal litigation practice and procedure. He is asked to provide commentary on behalf of, and quoted by, a number of media outlets, most notably on the demise of an adequately funded public criminal defence service and the growing inequality between those who can afford to pay for their own defence and those who must rely on legal aid. Such publications include The Telegraph, The Law Society Gazette and the New Law Journal. Meyer has consistently ranked as a top criminal solicitor in the independently researched trade directories The Legal 500 and Chambers and Partners.
- Phil Smith, senior partner at Tuckers, is a regular commentator for BBC on Newsnight, BBC News, Radio 4's Today Programme & World at One, Radio 5 Live Drive and Victoria Derbyshire Programme, ITN, Channel 4 News and Dispatches. He is also a commentator on Satellite broadcasting Arise TV and writes articles on legal topics for Huffington Post. Smith represented Neil Wallis, former Deputy Editor of The News of the World and Andy Coulson's confidante, recently acquitted of conspiracy to hack mobile phones after a high profile Old Bailey trial, throughout the entire four years’ Metropolitan Police Operations Weeting and Pine Tree and also at the Leveson Inquiry on three occasions when he gave evidence. He also represented a former Mirror Editor throughout Operation Golding, the police investigation into phone-hacking at Mirror Newspapers, also representing him in related High Court litigation.
- Richard Harrold, partner at Tuckers, in most compelling international case successfully defended a number of Albanian Nationals who have previously claimed to be "Kosovan”. The UK Border Agency were seeking to deprive them of their British citizenship. However, after a long drawn-out litigation, the UK Border Agency had confirmed that they will take no further action against them and agreed for them to be free to remain as citizens. According to statistics, more than 80,000 refugees settled in Britain when NATO expelled Serbian forces from the province amid accusations of "ethnic cleansing" in 1999. UK Border Agency were aware, through applications for Entry Clearance, Naturalisation or British Passports, of persons who have produced details of their identity which are different from the details previously provided. It was noted that Albanian Nationals were among those who posed as Kosovan Nationals during the conflict. The Secretary of State for the Home Department has been using this information to consider depriving citizenship under section 40(3) of the British Nationality Act 1981. This would mean that subjects would be stripped of their citizenship and be requested to return their passports and Naturalisation certificates. The UK Border Agency would then investigate how they obtained their status and take the appropriate action. Tuckers were involved in successfully challenging this process by means of Judicial Review which found that deprivation of citizenship i.e. the exclusion of perceived undesirables from the UK is one of the most important trends in immigration at the moment. Between 1983 and 2009 there were apparently no recorded instances of citizenship deprivation on the basis of dishonesty but since 2009 there were 30 such decisions, and the numbers have steadily been increasing.

== Recognition ==
In 2016 Chambers and Partners named Tuckers the nation’s biggest criminal law practice, and is the only law firm to receive the national recognition for their work in defence.

== See also ==
- Criminal defence
- Criminal justice
