= Market manipulation =

Deliberate attempt to interfere with and subvert the free market

In economics and finance, market manipulation occurs when someone intentionally alters the supply or demand of a security to influence its price. This can involve spreading misleading information, executing misleading trades, or manipulating quotes and prices.

Market manipulation is prohibited in most countries, in particular, it is prohibited in the United States under Section 9(a)(2) of the Securities Exchange Act of 1934, in the European Union under Article 12 of the Market Abuse Regulation, in Australia under Section 1041A of the Corporations Act 2001, and in Israel under Section 54(a) of the securities act of 1968. In the US, market manipulation is also prohibited for wholesale electricity markets under Section 222 of the Federal Power Act and wholesale natural gas markets under Section 4A of the Natural Gas Act.

In India it is illegal under the SEBI (Prohibition of Fraudulent and Unfair Trade Practices relating to Securities Market) Regulations, 2003.

== Examples ==
=== Pools ===
Agreements, often written, among a group of traders to delegate authority to a single manager to trade in a specific stock for a work period of time and then to share in the resulting profits or losses. In Australia section 1041B prohibits pooling.

=== Runs ===
When a group of traders create activity or rumours in order to drive the price of a security up. An example is the Guinness share-trading fraud of the 1980s. In the US, this activity is usually referred to as painting the tape.

=== Ramping (the market) ===
Actions designed to artificially raise the market price of listed securities and give the impression of voluminous trading in order to make a quick profit.

=== Bear raid ===
In a bear raid there is an attempt to push the price of a stock down by heavy selling or short selling.

=== Quote stuffing ===
Quote stuffing is made possible by high-frequency trading programs that can execute market actions with incredible speed. However, high-frequency trading in and of itself is not illegal. The tactic involves using specialized, high-bandwidth hardware to quickly enter and withdraw large quantities of orders in an attempt to flood the market, thereby gaining an advantage over slower market participants.

=== Cross-market manipulation ===
Cross-market manipulation occurs when a trader trades in one market for the purpose of manipulating the price of an asset in another market, capitalizing off the price-moving effects thus generated, instead of with the bona fide intent of profiting off the initial trade itself.

=== Cornering the market ===
In cornering the market, the manipulators buy a sufficiently large amount of an asset, often a commodity, so they can control the price creating in effect a monopoly. For example, the brothers Nelson Bunker and William Herbert Hunt attempted to corner the world silver markets in the late 1970s and early 1980s, at one stage holding the rights to more than half of the world's deliverable silver. During the Hunts' accumulation of the precious metal, silver prices rose from $11 an ounce in September 1979 to nearly $50 an ounce in January 1980. Silver prices ultimately collapsed to below $11 an ounce two months later, much of the fall occurring on a single day now known as Silver Thursday, due to changes made to exchange rules regarding the purchase of commodities on margin.

=== Pinging and spoofing ===
Pinging involves making small orders and then cancelling them with a computerized program in an effort to induce others in the marketplace to react to the "pings" and reveal their trading intentions to the party pinging. Similarly, with spoofing, a computerized program submits or cancelling multiple bids or offers to manipulate the price of a security.

=== Electronic front running ===
Similar to traditional front running, electronic front running uses knowledge of future orders to execute trades ahead of a future price. However, electronic front running utilizes financial technology to evaluate price changes and financial transactions for parties to execute advantageous trades.

== See also ==
- Ponzi scheme
- Insider trading
- Abuse of information – Improper usage or mistreatment
