= Strategist =

Person with responsibility for the formulation and implementation of a strategy

A strategist is a person with responsibility for the formulation and implementation of a strategy. Strategy generally involves setting goals, determining actions to achieve the goals, and mobilizing resources to execute the actions. A strategy describes how the ends (goals) will be achieved using the means (resources). Organizations generally task senior leaders with determining strategy. Strategy can be intended or can emerge as a pattern of activity as the organization adapts to its environment or competes. It involves activities such as strategic planning and strategic thinking.

== Types of strategists by field ==
The strategy role exists in a variety of organizations and fields of study.

In large corporations, strategic planners or corporate financial planning and analysis (FP&A) personnel are involved in the formulation and implementation of the organization's strategy. The strategy is typically set by business leaders such as the chief executive officer and key business or functional leaders and is reviewed by the board of directors.

An AI strategist uses evidence and reason to make circumstance-dependent decisions that shape the development of AI towards a set of desired outcomes. The scope of AI development can range from within small organizations to global landscape.

A design strategist has the ability to combine the innovative, perceptive and holistic insights of a designer with the pragmatic and systemic skills of a planner to guide strategic direction in context of business needs, brand intent, design quality and customer values.

An economic strategist is a person who can create a sustainable commercial advantage by applying innovative and quantitative ideas and systems at a sell side financial institution.

A political strategist is a multi-discipline strategist who works within political campaigns. Also known as political consulting, the political strategist will advise a campaign on a range of activities such as media, resourcing, opposition research, opinion polling and engagement strategy.

A sport strategist is a professional that performs scouting and analysis of the players involved in an upcoming competitive match. Sports strategists typically analyze film footage, organize video libraries, and recommend attacks and defensive strategies in order to capitalize on an opponent's weaknesses.

Working closely with investment managers, a principal investment strategist contributes revenue by providing principal investment analytics and alternative product structuring.

A sales strategist develops innovative trade ideas and assists in the marketing of those trades to buy side clients.

A banking strategist partners with investment bankers and capital market experts on corporate finance and capital structure analyses to identify and execute banking transactions.

A trading strategist contributes revenue to the business in which his team is embedded by developing and delivering innovative trade ideas, models and analytic systems to the trading desk.

Within the financial services industry, strategists are known as “strats”.

A military strategist develops strategies in the field of warfare with the objective of outmaneuvering their opponent.

An IT Strategist develops an IT strategy that is aligned with the business strategy to implement systems to give business processes efficiency and productivity gains and therefore a possible competitive advantage.

== Career paths ==
People who possess a strategist mindset are generally capable of doing well in any possible field due to the various traits that they own. Strategists tend to follow a career path that challenges them mentally in terms of development, and seek to work with people who are in the same caliber in terms of intelligence and competency. As it is highly likely that people with a strategist mindset tend to be more single-minded and may not be appreciative of others' effort, it is crucial for them to work in a suitable working environment.

Common careers that strategists tend to choose are:

1. Academia
2. Computing
3. Engineering
4. Sciences
5. Project Management
6. Research and development
7. Management

Strategists can have a variety of backgrounds such journalism, speech writing, data analyzing, or telemarketing. People with a background of public relations or advertising can be hired as strategists because of their experience in market research and message delivery.

== See also ==
- Business strategy
- Military strategy
- Grand strategy
- Naval strategy
- U.S. Army Strategist
