= List of electronic trading protocols =

Communications on electronic trading platforms are based on a list of well-defined protocols.

Although FIX protocol has grown significant market share, the exchange specific protocols (also called "Native" interfaces) have found a strong backing with people using low latency trading.

== Protocols used by electronic exchanges ==
List of Electronic Exchanges along with the protocols they currently expose as their E-Trading interface.

=== Americas ===
Exchange	Native Order Flow	FIX Order Flow	Market Data
B3 (stock exchange) (aka BM&FBovespa)	FIX	FIX4.4	UMDF (FIX/FAST)
Bolsa Mexicana de Valores	FIX	4.4 - version 2.4	INTRA (UDP) / SIVA (TCP)
BIVA	OUCH	FIX 5.0	ITCH
Boston Options Exchange	SAIL	4.2	HSVF
Cboe	BOE	4.2	PITCH
Chicago Mercantile Exchange	iLink	FIX	Simple Binary Encoding
Montreal Exchange	SAIL	4.2	HSVF
Nasdaq	OUCH 5.0 Client	4.0 - 4.2	ITCH5.0
NYSE	Pillar	4.2	
TSX	FIX Client	TSX-FIX	QUANTUMFEED
Aequitas Neo	FIX	FIX	NITCH
ICE	FIX	FIX	iMpact

=== Europe ===
Exchange	Native Order Flow	FIX Order Flow	Market Data
Cboe Europe	BOE	4.2	PITCH
Eurex	T7 ETI (Derivatives Markets Reference)	4.4	EOBI / FIX/FAST
Euronext	SBE	5.0	SBE
Borsa Italiana IDEM Derivatives	SAIL	4.2	HSVF
Liffe (ICE EU)	FIX	FIX	iMpact
London Stock Exchange	Native	5.0sp2	GTP
Moscow Exchange (MICEX)	MTESRL-TSMR	4.4	FIX/FAST
Moscow Exchange (RTS)	Plaza2	4.4	FIX/FAST
Oslo Børs (Derivatives)	SBE	5.0	SBE
Oslo Børs (Equities)	SBE	5.0	SBE
London Stock Exchange UK Derivatives	SAIL (Native)	4.2	HSVF
Turquoise	Native		GTP
Warsaw Stock Exchange	UTP	4.4	XDP
Xetra	T7 ETI (Cash Markets Reference)	4.4	EOBI / FIX/FAST

=== Asia ===
Exchange	Native Order Flow	FIX Order Flow	Market Data
Taiwan Stock Exchange	TMP (TWSE Message Protocol)	4.4	FIX/FAST
Taipei Exchange	TMP (TWSE Message Protocol)	4.4	
Tokyo Stock Exchange	Arrowhead	4.2	FLEX
Indonesia Stock Exchange	OUCH	5.0	ITCH
Singapore Exchange Securities Trading (SGXST)	OMEX	-	
Singapore Exchange Derivatives Trading (SGXDT)	OMEX	-	
Hong Kong Stock Exchange (HKSE)	OCG	5.0 SP2	OMD
Hong Kong Futures Exchange (HKFE)	OMEX	-	OMD
National Stock Exchange (NSE)	NEAT		
