= Systematic trading =

Trading modality

Systematic trading (also known as mechanical trading) is a way of defining trade goals, risk controls and rules that can make investment and trading decisions in a methodical way.

Systematic trading includes both manual trading of systems, and full or partial automation using computers. Although technical systematic systems are more common, there are also systems using fundamental data such as those in equity long:short hedge funds and GTAA funds. Systematic trading includes both high frequency trading (HFT, sometimes called algorithmic trading) and slower types of investment such as systematic trend following. It also includes passive index tracking.

The opposite of systematic trading is discretionary trading. The disadvantage of discretionary trading is that it may be influenced by emotions, isn't easily back tested, and has less rigorous risk control.

Systematic trading is related to quantitative trading. Quantitative trading includes all trading that uses quantitative techniques; most quantitative trading involves using techniques to value market assets like derivatives but the trading decision may be systematic or discretionary.

== History ==
Systematic trading began with the growth of computers in the 1970s. The Designated Order Turnaround (DOT) system used by the New York Stock Exchange to electronically route orders.

In the 1990s, various trading strategies were developed by major banks, including statistical arbitrage, trend following and mean reversion. High-frequency trading strategies that combined computing power, speed, and large databases were gaining more popularity due to their success rates.

After 2000, millions of trades were executed by the largest hedge funds in mere seconds with their black box systems.

== Approach ==
Suppose we need to replicate an index with futures and stocks from other markets with higher liquidity levels. An example of a systematic approach would be:

1. Identify, using fundamental analysis, which stocks and futures should be used for replication.
2. Analyze correlations between the targeted index and selected stocks and futures, looking for the strategy which provides a better approximation to index.
3. Define a coherent strategy to combine dynamically stocks and futures according to market data.
4. Simulate the strategy including transaction costs, rollovers, stop-loss orders, and all other wanted risk controls.
5. Apply the strategy in the real world using algorithmic trading for signal generation and trying to optimize the P&L, controlling continuously the risks.

== Risk management ==
Systematic trading associates with a number of risks, the returns can be very volatile and funds can quickly amass substantial trading losses without proper risk management. Therefore, systematic trading should take into account the importance of risk management, using a systematic approach to quantify risk, consistent limits and techniques to define how to close excessively risky positions.

Systematic trading, in fact, lends itself to control risk precisely because it allows money managers to define profit targets, loss points, trade size, and system shutdown points objectively and in advance of entering each trade.

By holding a diversified portfolio of individual systematic trading funds, the high level of volatility and manager-specific model risk can be mitigated.

== Systematic Traders ==
- Perry J. Kaufman, American systematic trader, index developer, and quantitative financial theorist.

== See also ==
- Risk modeling
- Quantitative trading
- Stock picking
- Security analysis
- Stock selection criterion
