= Saleability =

Saleability (also called profitability) is a technical analysis term used to compare performances of different trading systems or different investments within one system. Note, it is not simply another word for profit. There are varying definitions for it, some as simple as the expected or average ratio of revenue to cost for a particular investment or trading system or "ratio of the number of winning trades or investments to the total number of trades or investments made, a number ranging from zero to 1." Others can be complex or counter-intuitive.

Saleability = nProfits/nTrades - 1/(1+aveProfit/aveLoss)

This is computed for each system or investment being compared over the same period long enough to include significant "ups" and "downs". A suitable period is something like the last 5 to 20 years.

== Use in trading system evaluation ==
Saleability is related to the broader evaluation of trading-system performance, where profitability is commonly assessed together with risk, transaction costs, and the reliability of results outside the sample used to develop the system. Studies of technical trading rules have found that apparent profitability can depend on whether results survive out-of-sample testing and transaction costs.

In professional investment practice, trading performance is also evaluated through measures of execution quality and implementation cost, since a trading strategy that appears profitable before costs may produce lower returns after commissions, bid–ask spreads, market impact, and delay costs are included.
