= Alpha generation platform =

Technology used in algorithmic trading

An alpha generation platform is a technology used in algorithmic trading to develop quantitative financial models, or trading strategies, that generate consistent alpha, or absolute returns. The process of alpha generation refers to generating excess returns. Alpha generation platforms are tools used by hedge funds, banks, CTAs and other financial institutions to help develop and test quantitative trading strategies. Alpha generation platforms support quants in the creation of efficient and productive quantitative trading strategies.

== Background ==
Traditionally, quants have used tools such as MATLAB, R, C++ and other computer programming languages to create complex trading strategies that help them perform high-frequency trading. However, as market data volumes increase and more traders create financial models that deal with multi-asset class data, news sentiment data and more, quants must spend a large amount of time programming models, debugging code, and integrating multiple market data sources. This is why some firms have begun adding alpha generation platforms to their quant infrastructures.

These platforms are often seen as a complement to traditional quantitative tools as they can help quantitative analysts process huge volumes of market data. With many of these platforms, users can write out models in English, program models using the platform's supported computer languages, or import strategies written in MATLAB, C++, R and other languages. Alpha generation platforms also often include data integration and storage capabilities through built-in database solutions that capture, standardize and store massive volumes of financial tick data.

== Methodology ==
Alpha generation platforms are used to locate excess return in the capital market. They enable the development of mathematical and statistical models that help determine whether or not a specific investment may be profitable. In some quant-driven funds, these models make the final decision on whether to buy or sell an investment.

These systems cannot be fully trusted and require qualified quantitative analysts to try to prevent massive drawdowns. The dangers of relying upon a platform were illustrated in a 2007 paper by Andrew Lo.

The average quantitative strategy may take from 10 weeks to seven months to develop, code, test and launch. Alpha generation platforms differ from low latency algorithmic trading systems. Alpha generation platforms focus solely on quantitative investment research rather than the rapid trading of investments. While some of these platforms do allow analysts to take their strategies to market, others focus solely on the research and development of these highly complex mathematical and statistical models.

== See also ==
- Alpha capture system
