= Perry J. Kaufman =

American financial theorist

- Born: October 17, 1943 (age 82); New York, NY, USA
- Occupations: Rocket scientist, writer, systematic trader, investment manager, entrepreneur
- Website: www.perrykaufman.com and www.kaufmananalytics.com

Perry J. Kaufman is an American systematic trader, rocket scientist, index developer, and quantitative financial theorist. He is considered a leading expert in the development of fully algorithmic trading programs (mostly written in Fortran).

== Career ==
Kaufman publishes KaufmanSignals.com, geared towards individual traders, and the Kaufman Research Report, for systematic strategy developers. He received a BS in Mathematics from the University of Wisconsin and an MBA from the New York Institute of Technology.

=== Aerospace background ===
Beginning as a “rocket scientist” in the aerospace industry, Kaufman worked on the navigation and control systems for the Orbiting Astronomical Observatory, the predecessor of the Hubble Space Telescope. Moreover, he was involved in the development of navigation systems for Project Gemini which were later used for Apollo missions.

=== Trading experience ===
Kaufman worked in trading, research and advisory functions at major commercial banks, securities houses, central banks, and hedge funds.

After leaving the aerospace industry, Kaufman became a partner in an Illinois-based farm management company where, as a commercial hedger, he developed expertise in trading commodity futures markets. Between 1981 and 1991, Kaufman resided in Bermuda where he worked as Head of Trading Systems for Transworld Oil, Ltd. (Bermuda). He was a principal at Man-Drapeau Research (Singapore) from 1992 to 1998 and worked in consulting functions for Cinergy and Prudential-Bache. Between 2003 and 2008, Perry J. Kaufman worked as a portfolio manager and senior quantitative analyst for Graham Capital Management, a hedge fund with a focus on managed futures trading strategies. Kaufman is currently a consultant to Mizuho Alternative Investments and serves as a board member at ARIAD Asset Management GmbH. Kaufman also advises the Aquantum Group and collaborates with the company in the design of systematic trading programs and indices.

== Publications & Canon Contributions ==
Kaufman is the founder of the Journal of Futures Markets and creator of John Wiley & Sons's Traders Advantage series.

=== Books ===
- Point and Figure Commodity Trading Techniques (Investors Intelligence, Larchmont, New York, 1975)
- Commodity Trading Systems and Methods (John Wiley & Sons, 1978)
- Technical Analysis in Commodities (John Wiley & Sons, 1980), also in Japanese (UNI 1986)
- Handbook of Futures Markets (John Wiley & Sons, 1984)
- The Concise Handbook of Futures Markets (John Wiley & Sons, 1986)
- The New Commodity Trading Systems and Methods (John Wiley & Sons, 1987)
- Smarter Trading (McGraw-Hill, 1995)
- Global Equity Investing, with Alberto Vivanti (McGraw-Hill, 1997)
- A Short Course in Technical Trading (John Wiley & Sons, 2003), also in Chinese (Guangdong, 2006)
- Alpha Trading (John Wiley & Sons, 2011), also in Chinese (Guangdong, 2006)
- Trading Systems and Methods (John Wiley & Sons, sixth edition, 2020)
- Kaufman Constructs Trading Systems (2020)
- Learn to Trade: Trade To Win With A Rule-Based Method Paperback (2022)

=== Book contributions ===
- "Technical Analysis" in Nancy Rothstein's The Handbook of Financial Futures (McGraw-Hill, 1984)
- "Moving Averages and Trends" in Todd Lofton's Trading Tactics (Traders Press, 1991)
- "Essential Mathematics for Traders” in Ralph Acampora's Masters of Technical Analysis and Strategy (John Wiley & Sons, 2008)

== Board memberships and affiliations ==
- Advisor, Aquantum Group
- Board member, Ariad GmbH
