= FAST protocol =

Adaptation of the FIX protocol

The FAST protocol (FIX Adapted for STreaming) is a technology standard developed by FIX Protocol Ltd., specifically aimed at optimizing data representation on the network. It is used to support high-throughput, low latency data communications between financial institutions.

In particular, it is a technology standard that offers significant compression capabilities for the transport of high-volume market data feeds and ultra low latency applications.

== History ==
=== Timeline ===
- 2004 Market Data optimization Working Group (“mdowg”) was formed
- 2005 Proof of Concept (“POC”) project
- 2006 FAST 1.0 released
- 2007 FAST 1.1 released
- 2009 FAST 1.2 proposed

In November 2004, Mike Cormack (then CEO Archipelago Holding) spoke at the FPL (FIX Protocol Ltd) conference in New York regarding a call for action to meet the challenges of the increased market data volumes. The increasing volumes of market data were causing delays, preventing market data from reaching traders in a timely fashion, thus disrupting their ability to trade. The classic FIX tag value format was considered to be too verbose and had a high processing overhead. A working group was formed within FPL shortly after the conference.

== Current version of FAST ==
The approved standard is currently at version 5.0, and is used in commercially available products. There are Open Source implementations of the Protocol available.

== Exchanges that have adopted FAST ==
- NYSE Archipelago
- CME Group (CME)
- International Securities Exchange (ISE)
- NasdaqOMX
- Eurex
- Xetra
- Bombay Stock Exchange (BSE Ltd, India)
- BATS
- ICAP
- OPRA
- B3
- Nordic Growth Market (NGM)
- Moscow Exchange (MOEX)
- Shanghai Stock Exchange (SSE, China)

== Open source implementations ==
Source code for implementations of the FAST Specification are available from the following sources:

Description	Language	URL	License	Notes
FPL Reference Implementation	C (not C++)	https://www.fixtrading.org/standards/fast/	W3C Software License.	Not a complete implementation. Reference only.
FPL Reference Implementation	C#	https://www.fixtrading.org/standards/fast/	W3C Software License.	Not a complete implementation. Reference only.
OpenFAST	Java	https://openfast.sourceforge.net/	Mozilla Public License	Includes SCP 1.1
OpenFAST.NET	C#	www.sourceforge.net/projects/openfastdotnet/	Mozilla Public License	Includes SCP 1.1
QuickFAST	C++	https://github.com/objectcomputing/quickfast	New BSD License	Includes C# (.NET) wrapper
goFAST	Golang	www.github.com/co11ter/goFAST	Apache License 2.0	Not a complete implementation.

== See also ==
- Simple Binary Encoding is considered to be the successor to the FAST protocol
- List of electronic trading protocols
