= Sola Access Information Language =

Sola Access Information Language (SAIL) native protocol is primary form of front end access electronic communication protocol of Sola Trading platform

== See also ==
- List of active electronic trading protocols
