= Economic calendar =

Economic monitoring system

An economic calendar is used by investors to monitor market-moving events, such as economic indicators and monetary policy decisions. Market-moving events, which are typically announced or released in a report, have a high probability of impacting the financial markets.

An economic calendar is usually displayed as a chart showing the days, weeks and months of a particular year. Each day lists several market-moving events in chronological order, giving investors time to research and anticipate the specific release of interest to them.

== Economic indicator ==
An economic indicator is a statistic that conveys certain information about economic activity. Economic indicators allow investors to analyze the economic performance of a state, country or region, as well as make forecasts about future performance.

For example, each quarter the United States releases data on gross domestic product (GDP). This economic indicator allows investors to analyze the performance of the US economy over the previous three-month period, and make comparisons against the previous year. How fast the US economy grows can have a significant impact on market behavior.

Economic indicators are usually released by governments, international organizations and private research firms.

== Monetary policy ==
Monetary policy refers to the process by which central banks and other monetary authorities control the money supply. Each country and economic region has a monetary authority that seeks to promote stability and economic growth within its jurisdiction. One of the ways a monetary authority might do this is by adjusting (either increasing or decreasing) interest rates.

Central banks and monetary authorities meet several times each year to discuss current market conditions and determine whether or not monetary policy needs to be adjusted to achieve the desired result of stability and growth. These events are outlined in the economic calendar.

For example, the European Central Bank (ECB) meets every month to discuss monetary policy and determine the appropriate interest rate. The ECB's Governing Council announces the interest rate decision after the meetings. Investors use the announcement to not only hear about ongoing policy developments, but to forecast future ones.

Monetary policy is formulated and released by central banks and monetary authorities only.

== Volatility levels ==
An economic calendar not only lists daily events, but the volatility levels attached to them. A volatility level refers to the likelihood that a specific event will impact the markets. Economic calendars usually have a three-scale volatility gauge. If an event has a level one volatility, it is not expected to significantly affect the markets. An event with a volatility level of two is expected to impact the markets moderately, depending on other factors (e.g. other market-moving events, political factors, news items, etc.). An event with a volatility level of three is expected to have a significant impact on the markets. Highly volatile events are often the most closely monitored.

Below are some examples of level one, level two and level three events:

Volatility Level One

- Current Account
- Foreign Portfolio Investments
- Bill Auction

Volatility Level Two

- Purchasing Managers’ Index
- Retail Sales
- Industrial Production

Volatility Level Three

- Monetary Policy Announcement
- Consumer Price Index
- Employment data (job growth, unemployment rate)

Investors should also note that large, economically powerful countries usually have the biggest impact on the markets. In this case, an economic indicator released by a smaller country may not have the same impact as one released by a bigger country. For example, the consumer price index of Greece is unlikely to impact the markets, and some calendars will have it listed as a level one event. By contrast, consumer price index data from the United States or Eurozone will have the biggest impact on the markets. Countries and economic regions that tend to impact the markets the most are the United States, Eurozone, Japan and the United Kingdom.

Volatility levels are usually expressed in colour (see below):

| Volatility Level One |
| Volatility Level Two |
| Volatility Level Three |

== Event frequency ==
Events listed on the economic calendar are released at different intervals, depending on the nature of the event. Events usually occur weekly, monthly and quarterly (i.e. every three months). The frequency of the event also varies with each country and region.

As a general rule, most events occur monthly. Few events are released quarterly and even fewer are released weekly. Below are some examples.

Weekly Events

- Initial Jobless Claims (US)
- Business Outlook (Bank of Canada)
- M3 Money Supply (European Central Bank)

Monthly Events

- Unemployment Rate
- Consumer Price Index
- Building Permits

Quarterly Events

- Gross Domestic Product (GDP)
- Business Outlook (Bank of Canada)
- M3 Money Supply (European Central Bank)
