= Jump Trading =

American financial market trading firm

- Type: Private
- Founded: 1999
- Headquarters: Chicago, Illinois, US
- Key people: Bill Disomma, Paul Gurinas
- Products: Proprietary Trading
- Number of employees: 2000+
- Website: jumptrading.com

Jump Trading LLC is a proprietary trading firm with a focus on algorithmic and high-frequency trading strategies. The firm has over 2000 employees in Chicago, New York, Austin, London, Singapore, Shanghai, Bristol, Mumbai, GIFT City, Sydney, Amsterdam, Hong Kong, and Paris. The firm is active in futures, options, cryptocurrency, and equities markets worldwide.

The company is a member of the Principal Traders Group, an advisory group formed by the Futures Industry Association (FIA) to represent principal traders (i.e. independent proprietary trading firms that trade only on their own accounts).

Jump has been privately funded throughout its existence.

== History ==
Jump Trading was founded in 1999 by two former pit traders, Paul Gurinas and Bill Disomma, who met in the Deutsche Mark pit at the Chicago Mercantile Exchange (CME). While the firm got its start in the open outcry pits, Jump Trading does nearly all of its trading electronically.

The company has made substantial investments in high-frequency trading and infrastructure, including a Belgian microwave tower once owned by NATO, purchased in 2013 by a U.K. affiliate.

Following the 2010 flash crash, Disomma, Gurinas, and COO Matt Schrecengost met with CFTC chairman Gary Gensler to discuss the definition of spoofing as a disruptive trade practice as well as transparency and access to SEFs. This meeting contributed to regulatory efforts to implement new market rules stemming from the Dodd–Frank Act.

In April 2014, Jump was one of six high-speed trading firms subpoenaed by New York Attorney General Eric Schneiderman regarding their trading strategies, as well as the special arrangements they may have with exchanges and dark pools.

In May 2018, Jump was fined $250,000 by the U.S. Securities and Exchange Commission (SEC) due to a malfunction in one of its trading algorithms leading to the accidental accumulation of a short position worth hundreds of millions of dollars.

Gurinas and DiSomma also founded a venture capital firm, Jump Capital, in June 2012. By January 2016, the firm had invested in 30 companies. Jump Capital also invested $5 million in The Small Exchange in May 2019, a start-up retail trading futures exchange.

Jump Trading is a registered broker-dealer and member of multiple exchanges including the CME Group and the New York Stock Exchange. They are also members of most European exchanges including Eurex and the London Stock Exchange.

In September 2021, Jump announced their cryptocurrency business through a new brand named Jump Crypto.

== Lawsuit ==
On May 9, 2023, a class action suit was filed against Jump Trading and related entities and individuals, for violations of the Commodity Exchange Act, CFTC Regulations, and unjust enrichment. The lawsuit alleges Jump Trading participated in market manipulation of the stable coin UST and aided and abetted Do Kwon, alleging, "Jump had made over $1.28 billion in profits from selling the LUNA tokens it received at a steep discount in exchange for artificially propping up the price of UST and aUST." The lawsuit alleges Jump Trading used their acquisition of the wormhole bridge and investment in the Solana blockchain to artificially compel growth, as UST was one of limited stable coins offered in this ecosystem.

On December 20, 2024, Jump Trading's subsidiary, Tai Mo Shan, agreed to pay $123 million to the U.S. Securities and Exchange Commission (SEC) to settle allegations of misleading investors about the stability of UST.

== Philanthropy ==
In 2013, Jump Trading donated $25 million to fund the creation of the OSF HealthCare Jump Trading Simulation and Education Center.

In February 2014, Jump Trading donated an additional $25 million to fund a joint medical research project between OSF HealthCare and the University of Illinois at Urbana-Champaign's College of Engineering. In a statement from the institutions, the donation will support doctors and engineers working together on clinical simulation, education and health care issues striving to "improve the quality of care and outcomes for patients" and "reduce health care costs".
