= High Speed vendor Feed =

High Speed Vendor Feed (HSVF) is the market data vendor protocol of the electronic Sola Trading platform that is used for the dissemination of market data for options, futures, forwards and other exchange-listed derivative securities for five major derivative exchanges globally.

== History ==
As of 2011, the exchanges using the protocol include the following:

- Boston Options Exchange (BOX),
- Montreal Exchange(MX)
- Turquoise (trading platform), Derivatives, a multilateral trading facility for trading of IOB Russian (formerly EDX) and Pan European Derivatives
- Oslo Børs (Derivatives only) on the Oslo Stock Exchange,
- IDEM (Italian Derivatives Equity Market) on Borsa Italiana.

The HSVF protocol is part Sola Trading Solutions which was both designed and developed by The Montreal Exchange (Bourse de Montréal) which from May 2008 became a fully owned subsidiary of the TMX Group.

== Protocol definition ==
HSVF parses and broadcasts all of its market data in 4 major Sub categories:

- default Messages for Equity, ETF and Index options
- F Messages for futures
- B Messages for North American Options on Futures
- S Messages for all Derivative Strategies including Spreads, Strips, Straddles, Strangles, Combos, and User defined Complex orders.

The basic List of Messages that are available across all HSVF broadcasts are:

- Trades (C, CF, CB, CS)
- Request for Quotes (D, DF, DB, DS)
- Quotes (F, FF, FB, FS)
- Market Depth (H, HF, HB, HS)
- Trade Cancel (bust) (I, IF, IB, IS)
- Instrument Key (J, JF, JB, JS)
- Instrument Summary (N, NF, NB, NS)
- Beginning of Instrument Summary (Q, QF, QB, QS)

Various exchanges uses the following global Identifiers: Q = Montreal Exchange, B = Boston Options Exchange, E = Turquoise (trading platform) (Derivatives), O = Oslo Børs, I = IDEM (Italian Derivatives Equity Market) on Borsa Italiana.
