= High-frequency trading =

Type of algorithmic trading

High-frequency trading (HFT) is a type of algorithmic automated trading system in finance characterized by high speeds, high turnover rates, and high order-to-trade ratios that leverages high-frequency financial data and electronic trading tools. While there is no single definition of HFT, among its key attributes are highly sophisticated algorithms, co-location, and very short-term investment horizons in trading securities. HFT uses proprietary trading strategies carried out by computers to move in and out of positions in seconds or fractions of a second.

In 2016, HFT on average initiated 10–40% of trading volume in equities, and 10–15% of volume in foreign exchange and commodities. High-frequency traders move in and out of short-term positions at high volumes and high speeds aiming to capture sometimes a fraction of a cent in profit on every trade. HFT firms do not consume significant amounts of capital, accumulate positions or hold their portfolios overnight. As a result, HFT has a potential Sharpe ratio (a measure of reward to risk) tens of times higher than traditional buy-and-hold strategies. High-frequency traders typically compete against other HFTs, rather than long-term investors. HFT firms compensate for low profit margins by executing extremely high volumes of trades, often numbering in the millions.

A substantial body of research argues that HFT and electronic trading pose new types of challenges to the financial system. Algorithmic and high-frequency traders were both found to have contributed to volatility in the Flash Crash of May 6, 2010, when high-frequency liquidity providers rapidly withdrew from the market. Several European countries have proposed curtailing or banning HFT due to concerns about volatility. Other complaints against HFT include the argument that some HFT firms scrape profits from investors when index funds rebalance their portfolios.

== History ==
The rapid-fire computer-based HFT developed gradually since 1983 after NASDAQ introduced a purely electronic form of trading. At the turn of the 21st century, HFT trades had an execution time of several seconds, whereas by 2010 this had decreased to milli- and even microseconds. At that time, high-frequency trading was still a little-known topic outside the financial sector, with an article published by the New York Times in July 2009 being one of the first to bring the subject to the public's attention.

On September 2, 2013, Italy became the world's first country to introduce a tax specifically targeted at HFT, charging a levy of 0.02% on equity transactions lasting less than 0.5 seconds.

=== Market growth ===
In the early 2000s, high-frequency trading still accounted for fewer than 10% of equity orders, but this proportion was soon to begin rapid growth. According to data from the NYSE, trading volume grew by about 164% between 2005 and 2009 for which high-frequency trading might be accounted. As of the first quarter in 2009, total assets under management for hedge funds with high-frequency trading strategies were $141 billion, down about 21% from their peak before the worst of the 2008 financial crisis, although most of the largest HFTs are actually LLCs owned by a small number of investors. The high-frequency strategy was first made popular by Renaissance Technologies who use both HFT and quantitative aspects in their trading. Many high-frequency firms are market makers and provide liquidity to the market which lowers volatility and helps narrow bid–offer spreads, making trading and investing cheaper for other market participants.

=== Market share ===
In the United States in 2009, high-frequency trading firms represented 2% of the approximately 20,000 firms operating today, but accounted for 73% of all equity order volume. The major U.S. high-frequency trading firms include Jane Street Capital, Hudson River Trading, Jump Trading, Susquehanna International Group, Virtu Financial, Tower Research Capital, and IMC. The Bank of England estimates similar percentages for the 2010 UK market share, also suggesting that in Europe HFT accounts for about 40% of equity orders volume and for Asia about 5–10%, with potential for rapid growth. By value, HFT was estimated in 2010 by consultancy Tabb Group to make up 56% of equity trades in the US and 38% in Europe.

As HFT strategies become more widely used, it can be more difficult to deploy them profitably. According to an estimate from Frederi Viens of Purdue University, profits from HFT in the U.S. has been declining from an estimated peak of $5bn in 2009, to about $1.25bn in 2012.

Though the percentage of volume attributed to HFT has fallen in the equity markets, it has remained prevalent in the futures markets. According to a study in 2010 by Aite Group, about a quarter of major global futures volume came from professional high-frequency traders. In 2012, according to a study by the TABB Group, HFT accounted for more than 60 percent of all futures market volume in 2012 on U.S. exchanges.

== Strategies ==
High-frequency trading is quantitative trading that is characterized by short portfolio holding periods. All portfolio-allocation decisions are made by computerized quantitative models. The success of high-frequency trading strategies is largely driven by their ability to simultaneously process large volumes of information, something ordinary human traders cannot do. Specific algorithms are closely guarded by their owners. Many practical algorithms are in fact quite simple arbitrages which could previously have been performed at lower frequency—competition tends to occur through who can execute them the fastest rather than who can create new breakthrough algorithms.

The common types of high-frequency trading include several types of market-making, event arbitrage, statistical arbitrage, and latency arbitrage. Most high-frequency trading strategies are not fraudulent, but instead exploit minute deviations from market equilibrium.

=== Market making ===
According to SEC:

A "market maker" is a firm that stands ready to buy and sell a particular stock on a regular and continuous basis at a publicly quoted price. You'll most often hear about market makers in the context of the Nasdaq or other "over the counter" (OTC) markets. Market makers that stand ready to buy and sell stocks listed on an exchange, such as the New York Stock Exchange, are called "third market makers". Many OTC stocks have more than one market-maker. Market-makers generally must be ready to buy and sell at least 100 shares of a stock they make a market in. As a result, a large order from an investor may have to be filled by a number of market-makers at potentially different prices.

There can be a significant overlap between a "market maker" and "HFT firm". HFT firms characterize their business as "Market making" – a set of high-frequency trading strategies that involve placing a limit order to sell (or offer) or a buy limit order (or bid) in order to earn the bid-ask spread. By doing so, market makers provide a counterpart to incoming market orders. Although the role of market maker was traditionally fulfilled by specialist firms, this class of strategy is now implemented by a large range of investors, thanks to wide adoption of direct market access. As pointed out by empirical studies, this renewed competition among liquidity providers causes reduced effective market spreads, and therefore reduced indirect costs for final investors." A crucial distinction is that true market makers don't exit the market at their discretion and are committed not to, where HFT firms are under no similar commitment.

Some high-frequency trading firms use market making as their primary strategy. Automated Trading Desk (ATD), which was bought by Citigroup in July 2007, has been an active market maker, accounting for about 6% of total volume on both the NASDAQ and the New York Stock Exchange. In May 2016, Citadel LLC bought assets of ATD from Citigroup. Building up market making strategies typically involves precise modeling of the target market microstructure together with stochastic control techniques.

These strategies appear intimately related to the entry of new electronic venues. Academic study of Chi-X's entry into the European equity market reveals that its launch coincided with a large HFT that made markets using both the incumbent market, NYSE-Euronext, and the new market, Chi-X. The study shows that the new market provided ideal conditions for HFT market-making, low fees (i.e., rebates for quotes that led to execution) and a fast system, yet the HFT was equally active in the incumbent market to offload nonzero positions. New market entry and HFT arrival are further shown to coincide with a significant improvement in liquidity supply.

=== Quote stuffing ===
Quote stuffing is a form of abusive market manipulation that has been employed by high-frequency traders (HFT) and is subject to disciplinary action. It involves quickly entering and withdrawing a large number of orders in an attempt to flood the market, creating confusion in the market and trading opportunities for high-frequency traders.

=== Ticker tape trading ===
Much information happens to be unwittingly embedded in market data, such as quotes and volumes. By observing a flow of quotes, computers are capable of extracting information that has not yet crossed the news screens. Since all quote and volume information is public, such strategies are fully compliant with all the applicable laws.

Filter trading is one of the more primitive high-frequency trading strategies that involves monitoring large amounts of stocks for significant or unusual price changes or volume activity. This includes trading on announcements, news, or other event criteria. Software would then generate a buy or sell order depending on the nature of the event being looked for.

Tick trading often aims to recognize the beginnings of large orders being placed in the market. For example, a large order from a pension fund to buy will take place over several hours or even days, and will cause a rise in price due to increased demand. An arbitrageur can try to spot this happening, buy up the security, then profit from selling back to the pension fund. This strategy has become more difficult since the introduction of dedicated trade execution companies in the 2000s which provide optimal trading for pension and other funds, specifically designed to remove the arbitrage opportunity.

=== Statistical arbitrage ===
Another set of high-frequency trading strategies are strategies that exploit predictable temporary deviations from stable statistical relationships among securities. Statistical arbitrage at high frequencies is actively used in all liquid securities, including equities, bonds, futures, foreign exchange, etc. Such strategies may also involve classical arbitrage strategies, such as covered interest rate parity in the foreign exchange market, which gives a relationship between the prices of a domestic bond, a bond denominated in a foreign currency, the spot price of the currency, and the price of a forward contract on the currency. High-frequency trading allows similar arbitrages using models of greater complexity involving many more than four securities.

The TABB Group estimates that annual aggregate profits of high-frequency arbitrage strategies exceeded US$21 billion in 2009, although the Purdue study estimates the profits for all high frequency trading were US$5 billion in 2009.

=== Index arbitrage ===
Index arbitrage exploits index tracker funds which are bound to buy and sell large volumes of securities in proportion to their changing weights in indices. If a HFT firm is able to access and process information which predicts these changes before the tracker funds do so, they can buy up securities in advance of the trackers and sell them on to them at a profit.

=== News-based trading ===
Company news in electronic text format is available from many sources including commercial providers like Bloomberg, public news websites, and Twitter feeds. Automated systems can identify company names, keywords and sometimes semantics to make news-based trades before human traders can process the news.

=== Low-latency strategies ===
A separate, "naïve" class of high-frequency trading strategies relies exclusively on ultra-low latency direct market access technology. In these strategies, computer scientists rely on speed to gain minuscule advantages in arbitraging price discrepancies in some particular security trading simultaneously on disparate markets.

Another aspect of low latency strategy has been the switch from fiber optic to microwave and shortwave technology for long distance networking. The switch to microwave transmission was because microwaves traveling in air suffer a less than 1% speed reduction compared to light traveling in a vacuum, whereas with conventional fiber optics light travels over 30% slower. Especially since 2011, companies involved in HFT have massively invested in microwaves infrastructure to transmit data across key connections such as the one between New York City and Chicago but also between London and Frankfurt, going through Belgium thanks to a network of former US army antennas. However, microwave transmission requires line-of-sight propagation, which is difficult over long distances, driving some HFT firms to use shortwave radio instead. Shortwave radio signals can be transmitted over a longer distance, but carry less information; in 2020, a hedge fund partner quoted in Bloomberg News said that shortwave bandwidth is insufficient for transmitting full order book feeds for low-latency strategies. Firms have also looked into using satellites to transmit market data.

=== Order properties strategies ===
High-frequency trading strategies may use properties derived from market data feeds to identify orders that are posted at sub-optimal prices. Such orders may offer a profit to their counterparties that high-frequency traders can try to obtain. Examples of these features include the age of an order or the sizes of displayed orders. Tracking important order properties may also allow trading strategies to have a more accurate prediction of the future price of a security.

== Effects ==
The effects of algorithmic and high-frequency trading are the subject of ongoing research. High frequency trading causes regulatory concerns as a contributor to market fragility. Regulators claim these practices contributed to volatility in the May 6, 2010, Flash Crash and find that risk controls are much less stringent for faster trades.

Members of the financial industry generally claim high-frequency trading substantially improves market liquidity, narrows bid–offer spread, lowers volatility and makes trading and investing cheaper for other market participants.

An academic study found that, for large-cap stocks and in quiescent markets during periods of "generally rising stock prices", high-frequency trading lowers the cost of trading and increases the informativeness of quotes; however, it found "no significant effects for smaller-cap stocks", and "it remains an open question whether algorithmic trading and algorithmic liquidity supply are equally beneficial in more turbulent or declining markets. ...algorithmic liquidity suppliers may simply turn off their machines when markets spike downward."

In September 2011, market data vendor Nanex LLC published a report stating the contrary. They looked at the amount of quote traffic compared to the value of trade transactions over 4 and half years and saw a 10-fold decrease in efficiency. Nanex's owner is an outspoken detractor of high-frequency trading. Many discussions about HFT focus solely on the frequency aspect of the algorithms and not on their decision-making logic (which is typically kept secret by the companies that develop them). This makes it difficult for observers to pre-identify market scenarios where HFT will dampen or amplify price fluctuations. The growing quote traffic compared to trade value could indicate that more firms are trying to profit from cross-market arbitrage techniques that do not add significant value through increased liquidity when measured globally.

More fully automated markets such as NASDAQ, Direct Edge, and BATS, in the US, gained market share from less automated markets such as the NYSE. Economies of scale in electronic trading contributed to lowering commissions and trade processing fees, and contributed to international mergers and consolidation of financial exchanges.

The speeds of computer connections, measured in milliseconds or microseconds, have become important. Competition is developing among exchanges for the fastest processing times for completing trades. For example, in 2009 the London Stock Exchange bought a technology firm called MillenniumIT and announced plans to implement its Millennium Exchange platform which they claim has an average latency of 126 microseconds. This allows sub-millisecond resolution timestamping of the order book. Off-the-shelf software currently allows for nanoseconds resolution of timestamps using a GPS clock with 100 nanoseconds precision.

Spending on computers and software in the financial industry increased to $26.4 billion in 2005.

=== May 6, 2010 flash crash ===
The brief but dramatic stock market crash of May 6, 2010, was initially thought to have been caused by high-frequency trading. The Dow Jones Industrial Average plunged to its largest intraday point loss, but not percentage loss, in history, only to recover much of those losses within minutes.

In the aftermath of the crash, several organizations argued that high-frequency trading was not to blame, and may even have been a major factor in minimizing and partially reversing the Flash Crash. CME Group, a large futures exchange, stated that, insofar as stock index futures traded on CME Group were concerned, its investigation had found no support for the notion that high-frequency trading was related to the crash, and actually stated it had a market stabilizing effect.

However, after almost five months of investigations, the U.S. Securities and Exchange Commission (SEC) and the Commodity Futures Trading Commission (CFTC) issued a joint report identifying the cause that set off the sequence of events leading to the Flash Crash and concluding that the actions of high-frequency trading firms contributed to volatility during the crash.

The report found that the cause was a single sale of $4.1 billion in futures contracts by a mutual fund, identified as Waddell & Reed Financial, in an aggressive attempt to hedge its investment position. The joint report also found that "high-frequency traders quickly magnified the impact of the mutual fund's selling." The joint report "portrayed a market so fragmented and fragile that a single large trade could send stocks into a sudden spiral", that a large mutual fund firm "chose to sell a big number of futures contracts using a computer program that essentially ended up wiping out available buyers in the market", that as a result high-frequency firms "were also aggressively selling the E-mini contracts", contributing to rapid price declines. The joint report also noted "HFTs began to quickly buy and then resell contracts to each other – generating a 'hot-potato' volume effect as the same positions were passed rapidly back and forth." The combined sales by Waddell and high-frequency firms quickly drove "the E-mini price down 3% in just four minutes". As prices in the futures market fell, there was a spillover into the equities markets where "the liquidity in the market evaporated because the automated systems used by most firms to keep pace with the market paused" and scaled back their trading or withdrew from the markets altogether. The joint report then noted that "Automatic computerized traders on the stock market shut down as they detected the sharp rise in buying and selling." As computerized high-frequency traders exited the stock market, the resulting lack of liquidity "...caused shares of some prominent companies like Procter & Gamble and Accenture to trade down as low as a penny or as high as $100,000". While some firms exited the market, high-frequency firms that remained in the market exacerbated price declines because they "'escalated their aggressive selling' during the downdraft". In the years following the flash crash, academic researchers and experts from the CFTC pointed to high-frequency trading as just one component of the complex current U.S. market structure that led to the events of May 6, 2010.

== Granularity and accuracy ==
In 2015 the Paris-based regulator of the 28-nation European Union, the European Securities and Markets Authority, proposed time standards to span the EU, that would more accurately synchronize trading clocks "to within a nanosecond, or one-billionth of a second" to refine regulation of gateway-to-gateway latency time—"the speed at which trading venues acknowledge an order after receiving a trade request". Using these more detailed time-stamps, regulators would be better able to distinguish the order in which trade requests are received and executed, to identify market abuse and prevent potential manipulation of European securities markets by traders using advanced, powerful, fast computers and networks. The fastest technologies give traders an advantage over other "slower" investors as they can change prices of the securities they trade.

== Risks and controversy ==
According to author Walter Mattli, the ability of regulators to enforce the rules has greatly declined since 2005 with the passing of the Regulation National Market System (Reg NMS) by the SEC. As a result, the NYSE's quasi monopoly role as a stock rule maker was undermined and turned the stock exchange into one of many globally operating exchanges. The market then became more fractured and granular, as did the regulatory bodies, and since stock exchanges had turned into entities also seeking to maximize profits, the one with the most lenient regulators were rewarded, and oversight over traders' activities was lost. This fragmentation has greatly benefitted HFT.

High-frequency trading comprises many different types of algorithms. Various studies reported that certain types of market-making high-frequency trading reduces volatility and does not pose a systemic risk, and lowers transaction costs for retail investors, without impacting long term investors. Other studies, summarized in Aldridge, Krawciw, 2017 find that high-frequency trading strategies known as "aggressive" erode liquidity and cause volatility.

High-frequency trading has been the subject of intense public focus and debate since the May 6, 2010, Flash Crash. At least one Nobel Prize–winning economist, Michael Spence, believes that HFT should be banned. A working paper found "the presence of high frequency trading has significantly mitigated the frequency and severity of end-of-day price dislocation".

In their joint report on the 2010 Flash Crash, the SEC and the CFTC stated that "market makers and other liquidity providers widened their quote spreads, others reduced offered liquidity, and a significant number withdrew completely from the markets" during the flash crash.

Politicians, regulators, scholars, journalists and market participants have all raised concerns on both sides of the Atlantic. This has led to discussion of whether high-frequency market makers should be subject to various kinds of regulations.

In a September 22, 2010, speech, SEC chairperson Mary Schapiro signaled that US authorities were considering the introduction of regulations targeted at HFT. She said, "high frequency trading firms have a tremendous capacity to affect the stability and integrity of the equity markets. Currently, however, high frequency trading firms are subject to very little in the way of obligations either to protect that stability by promoting reasonable price continuity in tough times, or to refrain from exacerbating price volatility." She proposed regulation that would require high-frequency traders to stay active in volatile markets. A later SEC chair Mary Jo White pushed back against claims that high-frequency traders have an inherent benefit in the markets. SEC associate director Gregg Berman suggested that the current debate over HFT lacks perspective. In an April 2014 speech, Berman argued: "It's much more than just the automation of quotes and cancels, in spite of the seemingly exclusive fixation on this topic by much of the media and various outspoken market pundits. (...) I worry that it may be too narrowly focused and myopic."

The Chicago Federal Reserve letter of October 2012, titled "How to keep markets safe in an era of high-speed trading", reports on the results of a survey of several dozen financial industry professionals including traders, brokers, and exchanges. It found that

- risk controls were poorer in high-frequency trading, because of competitive time pressure to execute trades without the more extensive safety checks normally used in slower trades.
- "some firms do not have stringent processes for the development, testing, and deployment of code used in their trading algorithms."
- "out-of-control algorithms were more common than anticipated prior to the study and that there were no clear patterns as to their cause."

The CFA Institute, a global association of investment professionals, advocated for reforms regarding high-frequency trading, including:

- Promoting robust internal risk management procedures and controls over the algorithms and strategies employed by HFT firms.
- Trading venues should disclose their fee structure to all market participants.
- Regulators should address market manipulation and other threats to the integrity of markets, regardless of the underlying mechanism, and not try to intervene in the trading process or to restrict certain types of trading activities.

=== Flash trading ===
Exchanges offered a type of order called a "Flash" order (on NASDAQ, it was called "Bolt" on the Bats stock exchange) that allowed an order to lock the market (post at the same price as an order on the other side of the order book) for a small amount of time (5 milliseconds). This order type was available to all participants but since HFT's adapted to the changes in market structure more quickly than others, they were able to use it to "jump the queue" and place their orders before other order types were allowed to trade at the given price. Currently, the majority of exchanges do not offer flash trading, or have discontinued it. By March 2011, the NASDAQ, BATS, and Direct Edge exchanges had all ceased offering its Competition for Price Improvement functionality (widely referred to as "flash technology/trading").

== Violations and fines ==
=== Regulation and enforcement ===
In March 2012, regulators fined Octeg LLC, the equities market-making unit of high-frequency trading firm Getco LLC, for $450,000. Octeg violated Nasdaq rules and failed to maintain proper supervision over its stock trading activities. The fine resulted from a request by Nasdaq OMX for regulators to investigate the activity at Octeg LLC from the day after the May 6, 2010, Flash Crash through the following December. Nasdaq determined the Getco subsidiary lacked reasonable oversight of its algo-driven high-frequency trading.

In October 2013, regulators fined Knight Capital $12 million for the trading malfunction that led to its collapse. Knight was found to have violated the SEC's market access rule, in effect since 2010 to prevent such mistakes. Regulators stated the HFT firm ignored dozens of error messages before its computers sent millions of unintended orders to the market. Knight Capital eventually merged with Getco to form KCG Holdings. Knight lost over $460 million from its trading errors in August 2012 that caused disturbance in the U.S. stock market.

In September 2014, HFT firm Latour Trading LLC agreed to pay a SEC penalty of $16 million. Latour is a subsidiary of New York-based high-frequency trader Tower Research Capital LLC. According to the SEC's order, for at least two years Latour underestimated the amount of risk it was taking on with its trading activities. By using faulty calculations, Latour managed to buy and sell stocks without holding enough capital. At times, the Tower Research Capital subsidiary accounted for 9% of all U.S. stock trading. The SEC noted the case is the largest penalty for a violation of the net capital rule.

In response to increased regulation, such as by FINRA, some have argued that instead of promoting government intervention, it would be more efficient to focus on a solution that mitigates information asymmetries among traders and their backers; others argue that regulation does not go far enough. In 2018, the European Union introduced the MiFID II/MiFIR regulation.

=== Order types ===
On January 12, 2015, the SEC announced a $14 million penalty against a subsidiary of BATS Global Markets, an exchange operator that was founded by high-frequency traders. The BATS subsidiary Direct Edge failed to properly disclose order types on its two exchanges EDGA and EDGX. These exchanges offered three variations of controversial "Hide Not Slide" orders and failed to accurately describe their priority to other orders. The SEC found the exchanges disclosed complete and accurate information about the order types "only to some members, including certain high-frequency trading firms that provided input about how the orders would operate". The complaint was made in 2011 by Haim Bodek.

Reported in January 2015, UBS agreed to pay $14.4 million to settle charges of not disclosing an order type that allowed high-frequency traders to jump ahead of other participants. The SEC stated that UBS failed to properly disclose to all subscribers of its dark pool "the existence of an order type that it pitched almost exclusively to market makers and high-frequency trading firms". UBS broke the law by accepting and ranking hundreds of millions of orders priced in increments of less than one cent, which is prohibited under Regulation NMS. The order type called PrimaryPegPlus enabled HFT firms "to place sub-penny-priced orders that jumped ahead of other orders submitted at legal, whole-penny prices".

=== Quote stuffing ===
In June 2014, high-frequency trading firm Citadel LLC was fined $800,000 for violations that included quote stuffing. Nasdaq's disciplinary action stated that Citadel "failed to prevent the strategy from sending millions of orders to the exchanges with few or no executions". It was pointed out that Citadel "sent multiple, periodic bursts of order messages, at 10,000 orders per second, to the exchanges. This excessive messaging activity, which involved hundreds of thousands of orders for more than 19 million shares, occurred two to three times per day."

=== Spoofing and layering ===
In July 2013, it was reported that Panther Energy Trading LLC was ordered to pay $4.5 million to U.S. and U.K. regulators on charges that the firm's high-frequency trading activities manipulated commodity markets. Panther's computer algorithms placed and quickly canceled bids and offers in futures contracts including oil, metals, interest rates and foreign currencies, the U.S. Commodity Futures Trading Commission said. In October 2014, Panther's sole owner Michael Coscia was charged with six counts of commodities fraud and six counts of "spoofing". The indictment stated that Coscia devised a high-frequency trading strategy to create a false impression of the available liquidity in the market, "and to fraudulently induce other market participants to react to the deceptive market information he created".

In November 7, 2019, it was reported that Tower Research was ordered to pay $67.4 million in fines to the CFTC to settle allegations that three former traders at the firm engaged in spoofing from at least March 2012 through December 2013. The New York-based firm entered into a deferred prosecution agreement with the Justice Department.

=== Market manipulation ===
In October 2014, Athena Capital Research LLC was fined $1 million on price manipulation charges. The high-speed trading firm used $40 million to rig prices of thousands of stocks, including eBay, according to U.S. regulators. The HFT firm Athena manipulated closing prices commonly used to track stock performance with "high-powered computers, complex algorithms and rapid-fire trades", the SEC said. The regulatory action is one of the first market manipulation cases against a firm engaged in high-frequency trading. Reporting by Bloomberg noted the HFT industry is "besieged by accusations that it cheats slower investors".

In January 2023, Citadel Securities was fined ₩11.88 billion ($9.66 million) by the Financial Services Commission of South Korea for distorting stock prices with the use of immediate-or-cancel orders and by filling gaps in bid prices.

=== Frontrunning by a wholesaler ===
In July 2020, Citadel Securities was fined $700,000 by FINRA for trading ahead of customer orders.

== Advanced trading platforms ==
Advanced computerized trading platforms, including tools for high-frequency trading and market gateways are becoming standard tools for traders. Broker-dealers now compete on routing order flow directly, speed, and efficiency in sending the order for execution. Ultra-low latency direct market access (ULLDMA) is a widely discussed issue among brokers and technology vendors, such as Goldman Sachs, Credit Suisse, and UBS. Typically, ULLDMA systems can handle high amounts of volume and round-trip order execution speeds (from hitting "transmit order" to receiving an acknowledgment) of 10 milliseconds or less.

Such performance is achieved with the use of hardware acceleration or even full-hardware processing of incoming market data, in association with high-speed communication protocols, such as 10 Gigabit Ethernet or PCI Express. More specifically, some companies provide full-hardware appliances based on FPGA technology to obtain sub-microsecond end-to-end market data processing.

Buy side traders made efforts to curb predatory HFT strategies. Brad Katsuyama, co-founder of the IEX, led a team that implemented THOR, a securities order-management system that splits large orders into smaller sub-orders that arrive at the same time to all the exchanges through the use of intentional delays. This largely prevents information leakage in the propagation of orders that high-speed traders can take advantage of. In 2016, after having Intercontinental Exchange Inc. and others fail to prevent SEC approval of IEX's launch and having failed to sue as it had threatened to do over the SEC approval, Nasdaq launched a "speed bump" product of its own to compete with IEX. According to Nasdaq CEO Robert Greifeld "the regulator shouldn't have approved IEX without changing the rules that required quotes to be immediately visible". The IEX speed bump—or trading slowdown—is 350 microseconds, which the SEC ruled was within the "immediately visible" parameter. The slowdown promises to impede HST ability "often [to] cancel dozens of orders for every trade they make".

Outside of US equities, several notable spot foreign exchange (FX) trading platforms—including ParFX, EBS Market, and Refinitiv FXall—have implemented their own "speed bumps" to curb or otherwise limit HFT activity. Unlike the IEX fixed length delay that retains the temporal ordering of messages as they are received by the platform, the spot FX platforms' speed bumps reorder messages so the first message received is not necessarily that processed for matching first. In short, the spot FX platforms' speed bumps seek to reduce the benefit of a participant being faster than others, as has been described in various academic papers.

== See also ==
- Complex event processing
- Computational finance
- Dark liquidity
- Data mining
- Erlang (programming language) used by Goldman Sachs
- Flash Boys
- Flash trading
- Front running
- Hedge fund
- Hot money
- Market maker
- Mathematical finance
- Offshore fund
- Pump and dump
- Jump Trading
- Outline of finance § Quantitative investing

== Sources ==
- Aldridge, Irene, ed. (2012). High-Frequency Trading. doi:10.1002/9781119203803. ISBN 978-1-118-34350-0.
- Aldridge, Irene; Krawciw, Steven (2017). Real-Time Risk. doi:10.1002/9781119319030. ISBN 978-1-119-31896-5.
