= SuperDot =

Defunct electronic trading platform

SuperDot was the electronic system used by the New York Stock Exchange to route market orders and limit orders from investors or their agents to a specialist located on the floor of the exchange. SuperDot was the upgraded form of the previous electronic system used to route orders, known as the Designated Order Turnaround (DOT) system. Since 1976, most of the orders in NYSE had been transmitting electronically to specialists screens over the DOT or via the upgraded SuperDot. In 2009, SuperDOT was replaced by the new NYSE Super Display Book system (SDBK) for processing orders. In 2012, Display Book was replaced by Universal Trading Platform (UTP).

The user, either an investor or a broker, used to enter the order into the system, which immediately reached the specialist to be executed. The users received a confirmation report of the transaction in real time, once the order was executed. Most individual investors never had direct access to the SuperDot system. However, they indirectly utilized the system through software or online services offered by brokerages that in turn placed the client orders into the SuperDot.

== See also ==
- Electronic communication network
- Electronic trading
