= Sell side =

Financial institutions that provide investment services

Sell side is a term used in the financial services industry to mean providing services to sell securities. Firms or institutions on this side include investment banks, brokerages and market makers, who facilitate offering securities to investors, conducting research and creating financial products.

The three main markets for this selling are the stock, bond, and foreign exchange market. It is a general term that indicates a firm that sells investment services to asset management firms, typically referred to as the buy side, or corporate entities. The sell side and the buy side work hand in hand and each side could not exist without the other. These services encompass a broad range of activities, including broking/dealing, investment banking, advisory functions, and investment research.

== Use ==
In the capacity of a broker-dealer, "sell side" refers to firms that take orders from buy side firms and then "work" the orders. This is typically achieved by splitting them into smaller orders which are then sent directly to an exchange or to other firms. Sell side firms are intermediaries whose task is to sell securities to investors (usually the buy side i.e. investing institutions such as mutual funds, pension funds and insurance firms).

Sell side firms are paid through commissions charged on the sales price of the stock to its customers because the firm handles all the details of the trade on the customer's behalf. Another source of money would be the idea of a spread. A spread is the difference when one sell side firm sells to a client and then goes on to sell the security to another client. Clients of the sell side can be high-net-worth individuals or institutions that include retirement funds for cities or states, as well as mutual funds. Sell side firms employ research analysts, traders and salespeople who collectively strive to generate ideas and execute trades for buy side firms, enticing them to do business.

== Roles of sell side analysts ==
Sell side analysts have many roles. Sell side analysts rank stocks on a regular basis with three main options: buy, sell and hold. Part of the research analyst's job includes publishing research reports on public companies; these reports analyze their business and provide recommendations on the purchase or sale of the stock. Often, research analysts on the sell side cover an entire fund with a specific purpose or devoted to a specific sector. Sometimes a different approach is taken whereby multiple committees are in charge of different parts of the investment making process. Sell side analysts generally get their information for their reports from a variety of sources including public and private sources. The research reports ultimately published contain earnings forecasts, future prospects and recommendations as previously mentioned. In addition to the aforementioned, sell side analysts have the responsibility to take time and develop relationships with their clients as well as the companies they are researching. There has been research into the relationship between the quality of the research and the amount of capital that the firm collectively raises for its many clients. Many research analysts focus on one particular sector or industry such as telecom, technology, or healthcare, among many others. Sell side analysts are responsible for creating a pitch, usually in the form of a book, that is then presented to prospective clients usually for new stock.

In 1975, the structure of sales commissions underwent significant reform when the US Congress ended the SEC's requirement of having a minimum commission, also known as deregulation. One recent trend in the industry has been the unbundling of commission rates; simply put, this is the process of separating the cost of trading the stock (e.g. trader's salaries) from the cost of research (e.g. research analyst salaries). This process allows buy side firms to purchase research from the best research firms and trade through the best trading firms, which often are not one and the same.

== Tracking analyst performance ==
Analyst performance is ranked by a range of services such as StarMine owned by Thomson Reuters, Institutional Investor magazine, TipRanks, or Anachart. In particular the Institutional Investor categorizes by many subdivisions including leading analysts, global rankings, and leading executives. Analyst accuracy has been measured as well in studies involving forecast information. Generally analyst forecasting is measured by absolute forecast error. Generally absolute forecast error and overall inaccuracy are smallest when institutional investors are present. This also applies to future performance because when analysts have reasonably small forecast errors they will tend to have smaller forecast errors in their future predictions as well. It has been proven that higher analyst ranking and reputation leads to more trading volume, and when analysts are accurate in predictions they end up with better reputations at the end of the set period being measured by the ranking system. In addition to the above, Analyst Performance is housed in Financial/Nelson Information Directory of Fund Managers. This is a bit different, as it contains information on fund structure, investment style, and performance, as well as the decision-making process behind the investment choices.

== Conflict of interest ==
After the bursting of the dot-com bubble, many US sell side firms were accused of self-dealing in a lawsuit brought by New York Attorney General Eliot Spitzer. The charges were formally brought against several Bank of America Merrill Lynch analysts. In addition to the business done with buy side firms as described above, sell side firms also performed investment banking services for corporations, such as stock and debt offerings, loans, etc. These corporate clients generally did not like to see negative press put out about their own companies. To try to prevent the publishing of negative research, corporate clients would pressure the sell side firms by threatening to withhold lucrative banking business or equally lucrative shares in IPOs - essentially bribing the sell side firm. While the $1.4 billion settlement of this lawsuit made significant progress in cleaning up the industry in the US, it is notable that the lawsuit only went after sell side firms, leaving the arguably equally culpable corporations relatively unscathed.

In the past few years the role of a research analyst has changed. After the dot-com bubble, more research has been completed to see the actual roles and duties of a research analyst to get a better idea behind their decision-making process.

Other provisions such as the Sarbanes–Oxley Act (2002) and other regulations were enacted by the Securities and Exchange Commission in response to public outcry following the legal concerns. The Sarbanes–Oxley Act (2002) limits the relationship between investment banking and research analysts and prohibits promises of favorable research, as well as restricting and inciting pre-clearance requirements for traders' personal trading.

Sell side analysts can also have conflicting duties. One issue that has been brought up has been the idea of sell side stock rankings and maintaining a positive rating for an extended period of time. This was addressed in the New York Attorney General's case against Bank of America Merrill Lynch. It also has been proven that the longer an analyst has been following and researching a stock, the more and more favorable the recommendations become. The idea behind this is that the sell side analyst may become too comfortable and lose objectivity, something known as the capture hypothesis. Other conflicts of interest include opposing incentives for sell side analysts. Sell side analysts generally have a personal need for a good reputation, and if an analyst cares about their reputation he or she will try to report truthful information. However, analysts also have the desire to receive incentives to make positive recommendations because brokerage firms in and of themselves have internal conflicts of interest between differing departments such as trading, underwriting and sales. One conflict of interest would be the need for an analyst to provide this research mentioned above, i.e. research that is unbiased and reliable, which could lead to higher trading business for the firms for which the analysts work. Hence the trade-off or conflict of interest for an analyst would be the need for generating their firm business and their own personal career goals.

Under Chinese wall restrictions there is a threat of litigation, leading analysts to have less of an issue with bias in their research. A Chinese wall restriction is used to make sure important and private information is not inadvertently shared or "leaked" and that all clients within large multinational firms are protected. The actual idea stems back decades to the Great Depression, and has allowed the financial services industry to maintain one entity between investment banks and brokerages as opposed to requiring firms to have those two departments be separate entities.

Another conflict of interest is the idea of performance rankings. The Institutional Investor All Star Poll, one of the most popular ranking systems, facilitates a conflict of interest in that a high ranking on their platform can influence analyst career paths and their compensation. However, it also forces analysts to produce the best research and ensure it is timely as well. Another conflict of interest would be the presence of institutional investors. Sell side analysts taking the larger institutional investors into account leads to the issue of giving the larger investors more influence over stock recommendations.

Potential conflicts of interest in terms of biased research by sell side analysts are an issue on the sell side. There are recommendations that brokers use to help curb conflicts of interest. Suggestions include putting client commitments first, disclosing information as to how the broker is paid to clients, and providing the proper help so clients understand the level of risk they are undertaking with their investments.
