= Buy side =

Financial institutions that buy investment services

Buy-side is a term used in investment banking to refer to advising institutions concerned with buying investment services. Private equity funds, mutual funds, life insurance companies, unit trusts, hedge funds, and pension funds are the most common types of buy side entities.

In sales and trading, the split between the buy side and sell side should be viewed from the perspective of securities exchange services. The investing community must use those services to trade securities. The "Buy Side" is the buyer of those services; the "Sell Side", also called "prime brokers", is the seller of those services.

Sell side brokerages are registered members of a stock exchange, and are required to be market makers in a given security. Buy side firms usually take speculative positions or make relative value trades. Buy side firms participate in a smaller number of overall transactions, and aim to profit from market movements and accruals rather than through risk management and the bid–offer spread. The 2010 Thomson Reuters Extel/UKSIF Survey shows that buy-side firms are placing more emphasis on sustainability issues in the research and advisory services they receive from brokers.

Typically buy side firms do not provide custody services.

Buy side can also refer to real estate. There is a sell side and a buy side in every transaction. While most real estate technology currently focuses on the sell side, there are a few companies that are developing tools for the buy-side.

== Challenges facing buy-side ==
Globally buy-side asset managers are looking at increased regulation in regards to their use of financial index and benchmark data, including adhering to IOSCO Principles. This is expected to increase cost and time for the buy-side in managing their data.
