= List of stock exchanges in the Americas =

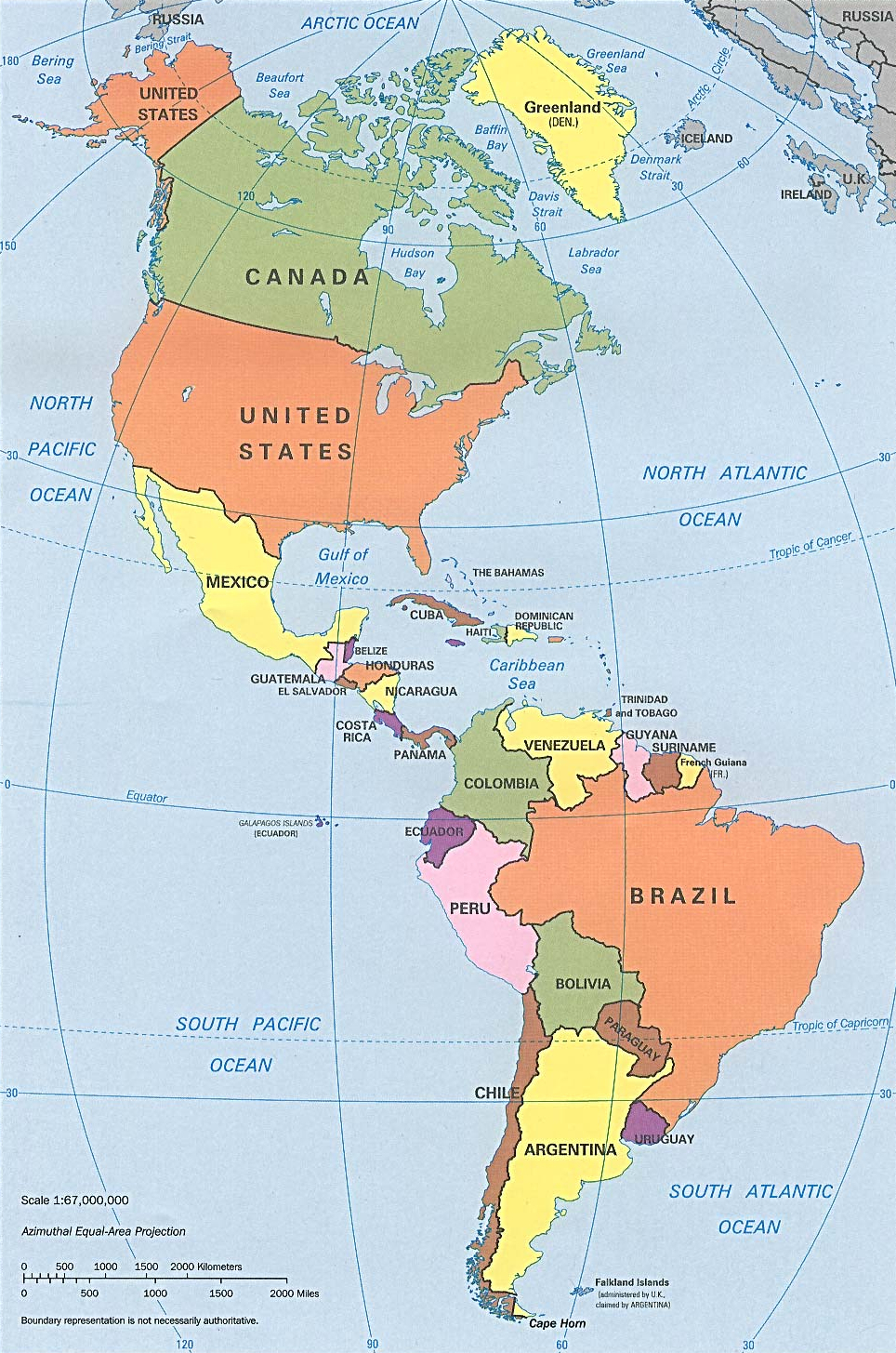
Political map of the Americas

This is a list of active stock exchanges in the Americas. Stock exchanges in Latin America (where Spanish and Portuguese prevail) use the term Bolsa de Valores, meaning "bag" or "purse" of "values". (compare Börse in German or bourse in French).

Several Caribbean states formed one regional stock exchange: the Eastern Caribbean Securities Exchange (ECSE), which serves Anguilla, Antigua and Barbuda, Dominica, Grenada, Montserrat, Saint Kitts and Nevis, Saint Lucia, and Saint Vincent and the Grenadines. The service area of the ECSE corresponds to the service area of the Eastern Caribbean Central Bank and Organisation of Eastern Caribbean States, with which it is associated. Further, a number of states in Latin America additionally formed a cross-linked between several stock exchanges known as AMERCA. The Latin-bloc namely features the nations of: Costa Rica, Curacao (and by-extension the Dutch Caribbean), Dominican Republic, Ecuador, El Salvador, Guatemala, Honduras, Nicaragua, and Panama in the regional cross-link service.

== Stock exchanges in the Americas ==
=== Stock exchanges in North America ===
Country	Group	Exchange	Location	Founded	Link	Operating MIC
Canada	CNSX Markets Inc.	Canadian Securities Exchange	Toronto	2004	CSE	XCNQ
Canada	Nasdaq, Inc.	NASDAQ Canada	New York City	2000	Nasdaq Canada	
Canada	TMX Group	Montreal Exchange	Montreal	1872	MX	
Canada	TMX Group	Toronto Stock Exchange	Toronto	1861	TSX	
Canada	TMX Group	TSX Venture Exchange	Calgary	2001	TSX	
Canada	Cboe Global Markets	Cboe Canada (formerly NEO Exchange)	Toronto	2015	Aequitas Neo	
Mexico		Bolsa Mexicana de Valores	Mexico City	1886	BMV	
Mexico		BIVA - Bolsa Institucional de Valores	Mexico City	2017	BIVA	
United States	TMX Group	BOX Exchange (formerly BOX Options Exchange)	Boston	2002	BOX	
United States	Cboe Global Markets	Cboe BYX Exchange (formerly Bats BYX Exchange; BATS Y-Exchange)	Chicago	2005	Cboe U.S. Equities	
United States	Cboe Global Markets	Cboe BZX Exchange (formerly Bats BZX Exchange; BATS Exchange)	Chicago	2005	Cboe U.S. Equities	
United States	Cboe Global Markets	Cboe EDGA Exchange (formerly Bats EDGA Exchange; EDGA Exchange)	Chicago	1998	Cboe U.S. Equities	
United States	Cboe Global Markets	Cboe EDGX Exchange (formerly Bats EDGX Exchange; EDGX Exchange)	Chicago	1998	Cboe U.S. Equities	
United States	Cboe Global Markets	Cboe Exchange	Chicago	1973	Cboe U.S. Options	
United States	Cboe Global Markets	Cboe C2 Exchange	Chicago	2010	Cboe U.S. Options	
United States	Cboe Global Markets	~~BATS Global Markets~~ (acquired by Cboe)	Lenexa, Kansas	2005	CBOE	
United States	Cboe Global Markets	~~CBOE Stock Exchange~~ (ceased trading April 30, 2014)	Chicago	1973	CBOE	
United States	IEX Group?	Investors Exchange (IEX)	New York City	2012	IEX	
United States	LTSE Group?	Long-Term Stock Exchange	New York City	2019	LTSE	
United States	?	Members Exchange (MEMX)	Jersey City	2019	MEMX	
United States	Miami International Holdings	Miami International Securities Exchange (MIAX)	Miami, Florida	2012	MIAX	
United States	Miami International Holdings	MIAX Pearl	Miami, Florida	2017	MIAX Pearl	
United States	Miami International Holdings	MIAX Pearl Equities	Miami, Florida	2020	MIAX Pearl Equities	
United States	Miami International Holdings	MIAX Emerald	Miami, Florida	2019	MIAX Emerald	
United States	Nasdaq, Inc.	The Nasdaq Stock Market	New York City	1971	Nasdaq	
United States	Nasdaq, Inc.	Nasdaq BX (formerly NASDAQ OMX BX; Boston Stock Exchange)	Boston	1834	Nasdaq BX	
United States	Nasdaq, Inc.	Nasdaq PHLX (formerly NASDAQ OMX PHLX; Philadelphia Stock Exchange)	Philadelphia	1790	Nasdaq PHLX	
United States	Nasdaq, Inc.	Nasdaq GEMX (formerly ISE Gemini)	New York City	2000/2013	Nasdaq	
United States	Nasdaq, Inc.	Nasdaq ISE (formerly International Securities Exchange)	New York City	2000/2013	Nasdaq	
United States	Nasdaq, Inc.	Nasdaq MRX (formerly ISE Mercury)	New York City	2000/2013	Nasdaq	
United States	Intercontinental Exchange	New York Stock Exchange	New York City	1817	NYSE	
United States	Intercontinental Exchange	NYSE Arca	Chicago	2006	NYSE Arca	
United States	Intercontinental Exchange	NYSE Chicago (formerly Chicago Stock Exchange)	Chicago	1882	NYSE Chicago	
United States	Intercontinental Exchange	NYSE American (formerly NYSE MKT, NYSE Amex, NYSE Alternet US, and the American Stock Exchange)	New York City	1908	NYSE American	
United States	Intercontinental Exchange	NYSE National (formerly National Stock Exchange; Cincinnati Stock Exchange)	Jersey City	1885	NYSE National	
United States	TXSE Group Inc	TXSE	Dallas	2026	TXSE	

=== Stock exchanges in Latin America and the Caribbean ===
Country	Group	Exchange	Location	Founded	Link	Operating MIC
Anguilla		ECSE				
Antigua and Barbuda		ECSE				
Argentina		Buenos Aires Stock Exchange	Buenos Aires	1854	BCBA	
Argentina		Mercado Abierto Electrónico	Buenos Aires	1988	MAE	
Argentina		Rosario Stock Exchange	Rosario	1884	BCR	
(The Bahamas) Bahamas		Bahamas Securities Exchange	Nassau	1999	BISX	
Barbados		Barbados Stock Exchange	Bridgetown	1987	BSE	
Bermuda	Miami International Holdings	Bermuda Stock Exchange	Hamilton	1971	BSX	
Bolivia		Bolsa Boliviana de Valores	La Paz	1990	BBV	
Brazil		B3 — Brasil, Bolsa, Balcão	São Paulo	1890	B3	
Brazil		Bolsa de Cereais e Mercadorias de Maringá	Maringá	1982	BCMM	
Cayman Islands		Cayman Islands Stock Exchange	George Town	1997	CSX	
Chile		Santiago Stock Exchange (MILA)	Santiago	1893	SSE	
Chile		Bolsa Electronica de Chile	Santiago	1989	BEC	
Colombia		Colombia Stock Exchange (MILA)	Bogotá	1928	BVC	
Costa Rica		Bolsa Nacional de Valores	San José	1976	BNV	
(Curaçao) Curacao		Dutch Caribbean Securities Exchange	Willemstad	2010	DCSX	
Dominica		ECSE				
Dominican Republic		Latin American International Financial Exchange	Guayacanes	proposed	LAIFEX	
Dominican Republic		Bolsa de Valores de la República Dominicana	Santo Domingo	1991	BVRD	
Ecuador		Bolsa de Valores de Guayaquil	Guayaquil	1969	BVG	
Ecuador		Bolsa de Valores de Quito	Quito	1969	BVQ	
El Salvador		Bolsa de Valores de El Salvador	San Salvador	1992	BVES	
Grenada		ECSE				
Guatemala		Bolsa Nacional de Valores	Guatemala City	1987	BVNSA	
Guyana		Guyana Stock Exchange	Georgetown	2003	GASCI	
Haiti		Haitian Stock Exchange		2007	HSE	
Honduras		Bolsa Centroamericana de Valores	Tegucigalpa	2005	BCV	
Honduras		Bolsa Hondureña de Valores		1993	BHV	
Jamaica		Jamaica Stock Exchange	Kingston	1968	JSE	
Montserrat		ECSE				
Nicaragua		Bolsa de Valores de Nicaragua	Managua	1990	BVDN	
Panama		Bolsa de Valores de Panamá	Panama City	1989	BVP	
Paraguay		Bolsa de Valores de Asunción	Asunción	1977	BVA	
Peru		Lima Stock Exchange (MILA)	Lima	1860	BVL	
Saint Kitts and Nevis		Eastern Caribbean Securities Exchange	Basseterre, Saint Kitts	2001	ECSE	
Saint Lucia		ECSE				
Saint Vincent and the Grenadines		ECSE				
Suriname		Suriname Stock Exchange	Paramaribo	1994	SSE	
Trinidad and Tobago		Trinidad and Tobago Stock Exchange	Port of Spain	1981	TTSE	
Uruguay		Bolsa de Valores de Montevideo	Montevideo	1867	BVM	
Uruguay		Bolsa Electronica de Valores de Uruguay	Montevideo	1993	BEVSA	
Venezuela		Bolsa de Valores de Caracas	Caracas	1947	BVC	

== See also ==
- List of futures exchanges
- List of stock exchanges
