= Economy of Curaçao =

- Currency: Caribbean guilder (XCG)
- Fiscal year: Calendar Year
- Trade organisations: Trade Union Centre of Curaçao
- Country group: Developed/Advanced; High-income economy

Statistics
- GDP: $4.312 billion (2023 est.)
- GDP growth: 4,2% (2023 est.)
- GDP per capita: $27,700 (2023 est.)
- GDP by sector: agriculture: 0.3%; industry: 11.7%; services: 73.3% (2023 est.)
- Inflation (CPI): 3.8% (2021 est.)
- Labour force: 74,539 (2019 est.)
- Labour force by occupation: agriculture: 1.2%; industry: 16.9%; services: 81.8% (2006)
- Unemployment: 7.8% (2024)
- Main industries: Tourism; Petroleum refining Petroleum transshipment Light manufacturing Financial services

External
- Exports: $2.107 billion (2023 est.)
- Export goods: Petroleum products
- Main export partners: United States 15.1% Guatemala 11.2% Panama 10.7% Dominican Republic 9.6% Haiti 7.6% Bahamas 6.1% Costa Rica 5.1% (2009 est.)
- Imports: $2.764 billion (2023 est.)
- Import goods: Food and Crude Petroleum
- Main import partners: Venezuela 57.3% United States 18.3% Mexico 10.5% Brazil 8.1% Netherlands 5.7% Chile 3.5% (2009 est.)

Public finance
- Government debt: $1.0 billion
- All values, unless otherwise stated, are in US dollars.

The economy of Curaçao is a high income economy, as defined by the World Bank. The island has a well-developed infrastructure with strong tourism and financial services sectors. Shipping, international trade, oil refining, and other activities related to the port of Willemstad (like the Free Trade Zone) also make a significant contribution to the economy.

Curaçao has one of the highest standards of living in the Caribbean, ranking 73rd in the world in terms of GDP (PPP) per capita and 56th in the world in terms of nominal GDP per capita.

To achieve the government's aim to make its economy more diverse, efforts are being made to attract more foreign investment. This policy, called the 'Open Arms' policy, features a heavy focus on information technology companies.

== History ==
Early in its history, Curaçao's economy was centered on salt mining from saline-rich ponds located in the eastern part of the island. Up until that time, dating back to the 16th century, settlers (first Spanish & later Dutch & Sephardic Portuguese Jews) made numerous, failed attempts at creating an agricultural industry. Curaçao's arid climate, which features few freshwater sources, made it difficult and unprofitable.

Although the island's geography was at first considered an obstacle economically, it later proved to be invaluable due to its ideal location for trade and commerce. Shipping and trading operations centered on the port of Willemstad played an important role in the development of the economy.

In the early 20th century, discovery of oil in Venezuela caused major oil companies to invest in the region. Beginning in 1920, oil refining has become a key part of the island's economy, representing nearly 90% of its exports.

During WWII, Curaçao was a safe-haven for Dutch multi-national companies, beginning the island's history as a financial services center.

Tourism is also becoming an increasingly important sector of the economy. The construction of the Mega Pier has recently allowed larger cruise ships to dock at Curaçao, increasing its position as a tourism destination.

== Tourism ==
Curaçao is a major international tourism destination, drawing significant visitor markets from the Netherlands, the United States, South America, and Germany. The island's location outside the primary Atlantic hurricane belt provides a structural advantage for year-round cruise and maritime operations. According to data from the Ministry of Economic Development and the Curaçao Tourist Board (CTB), the tourism sector experienced unprecedented growth by 2024, welcoming 700,249 stayover visitors and 834,922 cruise arrivals, generating an estimated total economic impact of US$2.7 billion. To accommodate this multi-modal expansion, air infrastructure was modernized; by 2025, Curaçao International Airport (Hato) logged a record-breaking 2,461,000 total passenger movements, operating as a diversified regional hub connecting twenty-four international gateways.

The island's unique marine geology makes it a highly sought-after destination for scuba diving and eco-tourism. The surrounding narrow insular shelf drops off precipitously close to shore, a bathymetric feature known as the "Blue Edge." On the windward northern coastline, this drop-off occurs within approximately 60 meters (200 ft) of the shore, while the leeward southern coast features a shallow reef terrace extending 50 to 100 meters before plunging into deep waters. This close proximity allows divers to access prominent coral ecosystems directly from the shore without the use of watercraft. The sheltered southern coast is characterized by calmer, navigable waters with a dominant east-to-west current flow driven by the broader Caribbean Current. This stable hydrodynamic profile protects numerous sandy bays, with locations like Jan Thiel and Cas Abao serving as prominent recreational hubs and vessel moorings.

However, rapid coastal development and heavy recreational usage have exerted severe anthropogenic pressures on local marine habitats. In response to regional coral degradation, community and private entities have implemented active ecological restoration projects. At Playa Porto Mari, ongoing experiments utilize artificial coral substrate matrices, such as concrete modules and specialized artificial structures, to stabilize the seabed, promote coral larval settlement, and re-establish critical biomass pathways for tropical reef fish populations.

== Oil refining ==
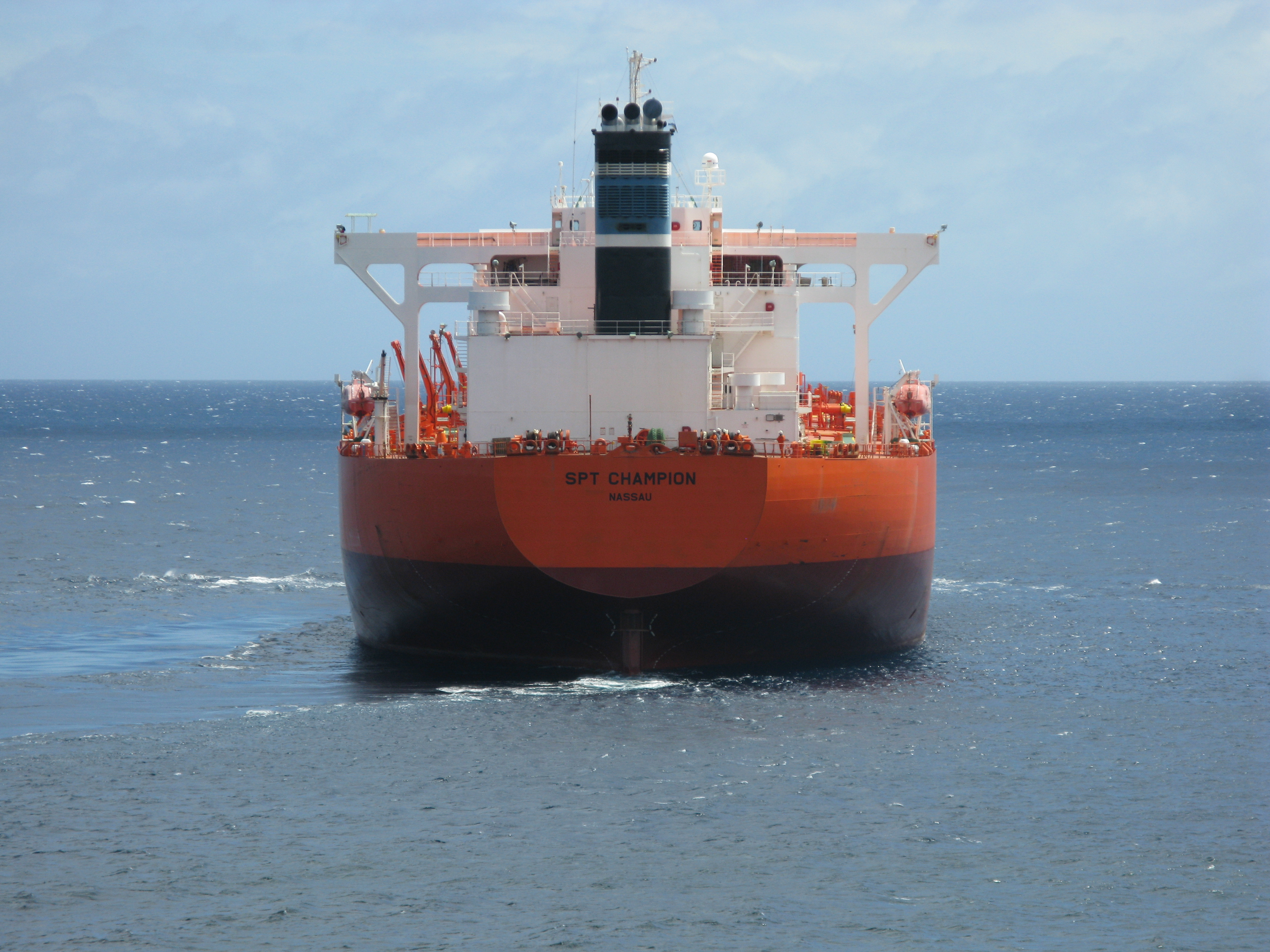
Oil tanker departing from the port of Willemstad

The discovery of oil in the Maracaibo Basin of Venezuela in the early 20th century forced the Venezuelan government to search for ideal locations for large scale refining. Curaçao's proximity to the country, naturally deep harbors, and stable government led Royal Dutch Shell to construct the Isla oil refinery, the largest refinery in the world at the time. The refinery is located in the Schottegat, the natural harbour beyond Willemstad and began operating in 1918.

Venezuela's state oil company, Petróleos de Venezuela (PDVSA) operated the Isla refinery, which had a 320,000 barrel per day capacity until it closed in 2019.

In 2017, negotiations were underway with a Chinese company, Guangdong Zhenrong Energy (GZE). In July, the discussions were suspended but Prime Minister Rhuggenaath announced that he would travel to China later in the year to reopen negotiations.

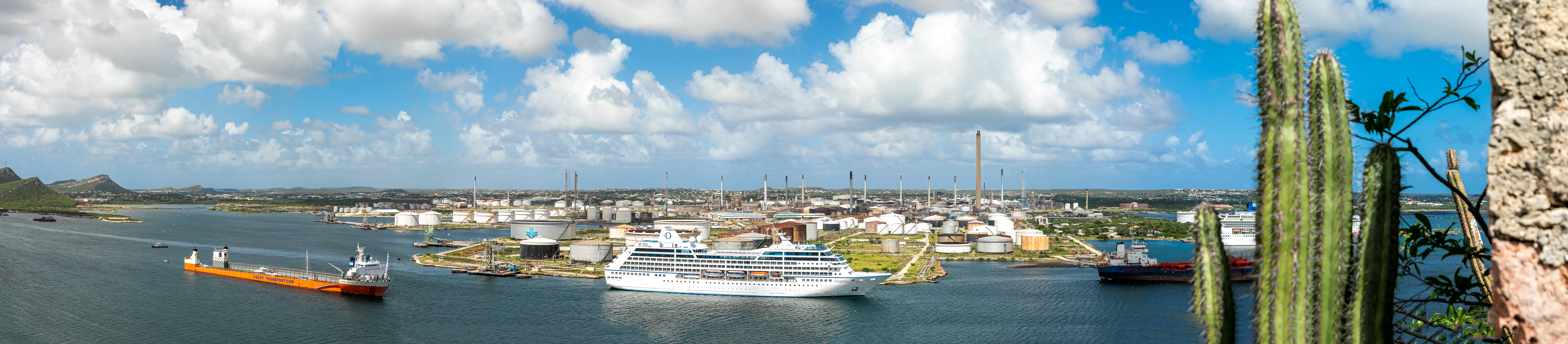
Isla Oil Refinery in Port of Willemstad photographed from Fort Nassau

== Financial services ==
Curaçao's history in financial services dates from World War I with the conversion of the financial arms of local merchant houses into commercial banks. As the economy grew, these banks began assuming additional functions eventually becoming full-fledged financial institutions. The Dutch Caribbean Securities Exchange is located in the capital of Willemstad, as is the Central Bank of Curaçao and Sint Maarten; the latter of which dates to 1828 making it the oldest central bank in the Western Hemisphere. The island's legal system supports a wide variety of corporate structures and is a popular corporate haven. Curaçao is considered a tax haven yet it adheres to the EU Code of Conduct against harmful tax practices. It holds a qualified intermediary status from the United States I.R.S. and is an accepted jurisdiction of the OECD and Caribbean Financial Action Task Force on Money Laundering. The country strongly enforces Anti-Money Laundering and Counter-Terrorism funding compliance.

In addition to these financial services, Curaçao has become a hub for online gambling companies, thanks to its favorable regulatory environment. Many international online gaming platforms, including Stake, are registered in Curaçao.

== See also ==
- Curaçao Economy
- Economy of the Caribbean
- Caribbean guilder
- Central Bank of Curaçao and Sint Maarten
- Central banks and currencies of the Caribbean
- Dutch Caribbean Securities Exchange
- List of countries by credit rating
- List of Latin American and Caribbean countries by GDP (nominal)
- List of Latin American and Caribbean countries by GDP (PPP)
- List of countries by tax revenue as percentage of GDP
- List of countries by future gross government debt
- List of countries by leading trade partners
