= Bursa (disambiguation) =

Bursa is a large city in Turkey.

Bursa may also refer to:

== Places and jurisdictions ==
- Bursa Province, Asian Turkey, named after its above capital
  - Bursa (electoral district)
- Bursa (woreda), a district in Southern Nations, Nationalities, and Peoples' Region, Ethiopia

== Biology ==
- Bursa (genus), a genus of gastropods
- Bursa of Fabricius, a lymphatic organ in birds
- Bursa Tumbler, a breed of domestic pigeon
- Synovial bursa, a fluid filled sac located between a bone and tendon

== Finance ==
- Bursa Efek Indonesia or Indonesia Stock Exchange, previously two separate entities:
  - Bursa Efek Jakarta or Jakarta Stock Exchange
  - Bursa Efek Surabaya or Surabaya Stock Exchange
- Bursa Malaysia, the Malaysian stock exchange
- Tel Aviv Stock Exchange, also known as The Bursa

== Other uses ==
- Bursa (liturgy), an embroidered pouch containing the corporal used in the Holy Mass
- Bursa (Romanian newspaper), published in Bucharest
- Bursa (Star Wars), a fictional creature
- SS Bursa, a British tanker in service 1946–1961
- Bursa, a 1946 meteorite that fell in Bursa, Turkey
- Bursa (education), a dormitory or a boarding school by an educational institution

== See also ==
- Bursar
- Bourse (disambiguation)
- Brusa (disambiguation)
