= List of stock exchanges in the United Kingdom, Crown Dependencies and British Overseas Territories =

This is a list of stock exchanges located in the United Kingdom, the Crown Dependencies, or the British Overseas Territories. They are as follows:

Several nations of the Caribbean comprise one of two major regional stock exchanges: the Eastern Caribbean Securities Exchange (ECSE), which covers the two overseas territories of Anguilla and Montserrat, along with the independent countries of Antigua and Barbuda, Dominica, Grenada, Saint Kitts and Nevis, Saint Lucia, and Saint Vincent and the Grenadines. The service area of the ECSE corresponds to the service area of the Eastern Caribbean Central Bank, with which it is associated.

== Exchanges ==
Exchange	Location	Headquarters	Founded	Listings	Link
Bermuda Stock Exchange	Bermuda	Hamilton	1971	800	BSX
Cayman Islands Stock Exchange	Cayman Islands	George Town	1997	900	CSX
Eastern Caribbean Securities Exchange (ECSE)	Anguilla Montserrat Alongside the independent countries of: Antigua and Barbuda; Dominica; Grenada; Saint Kitts and Nevis; Saint Vincent and the Grenadines	Basseterre, Saint Kitts	2001		ECSE
Gibraltar Stock Exchange	Gibraltar	Gibraltar	2014		GSXL
The International Stock Exchange	(Guernsey) (Jersey) Channel Islands	Guernsey	2013	4200	TISE
London Stock Exchange	United Kingdom	London	1801	1918	XLON
PLUS Markets Group (ceased operations in 2012)	United Kingdom	London	2004		PLSX

== See also ==
- Hong Kong Stock Exchange
- List of British currencies
- List of countries by leading trade partners
- List of Commonwealth of Nations countries by GDP
- List of stock exchanges in the Commonwealth of Nations
