= Cosmin Marinescu =

Romanian economist

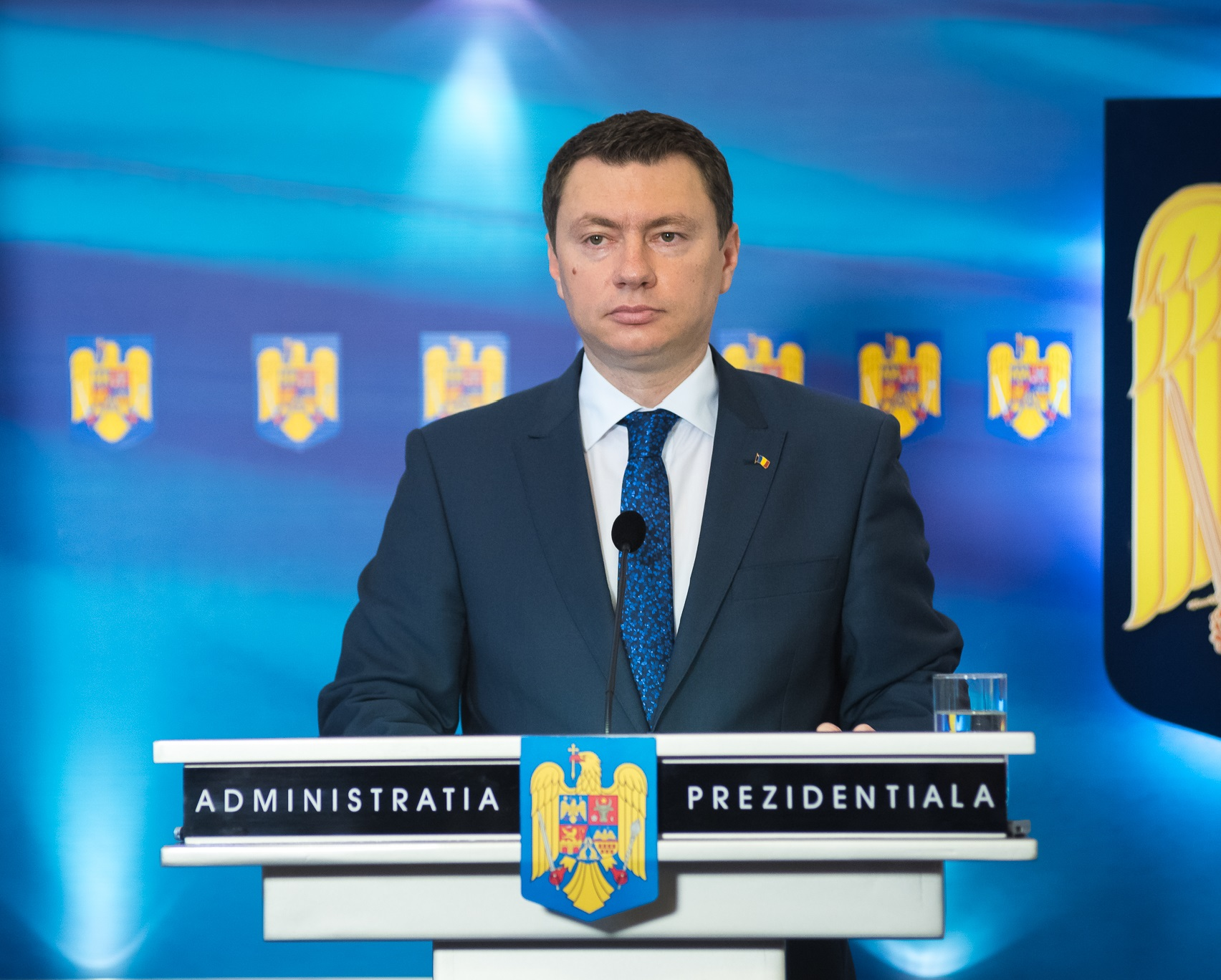

Presidential Advisor
- Incumbent
- Assumed office 22 December 2014
- President: Klaus Iohannis

Personal details
- Born: 29 March 1976 (age 50) Târgoviște, Romania
- Education: Bucharest Academy of Economic Studies
- Occupation: Economist, Professor

Cosmin-Ștefan Marinescu (born 29 March 1976) is a Romanian economist and professor of economics at the Bucharest Academy of Economic Studies. On 22 December 2014, he was appointed Presidential Advisor on Economic and Social Policy to the President of Romania. Previously, he served as Advisor to the Romanian Minister of Economy, Trade and Business Environment (2012), and the Advisor to the Romanian Minister of Public Finance (2013). He is also the founder of the Centre for Economics and Liberty - ECOL, a Romanian non-profit educational and research initiative aiming to promote the principles of democracy and economic freedom.

== Background ==
Born in Târgoviște, Dâmbovița County, Romania, Marinescu attended high school between 1990 and 1994, following a mathematics-physics specialisation at “Mihai Viteazul” National College in Ploiești. He then pursued his university studies in economics at the Bucharest Academy of Economic Studies, completing his Bachelor's studies in 1998 and his Masters studies in 1999. During his last year as a bachelor student, Marinescu also studied in France, at Lille University of Science and Technology. In 1999 he started his doctoral studies at the Bucharest Academy of Economic Studies, obtaining his Ph.D. in economics in 2003.

== Career ==
=== Academic ===
Marinescu started his academic career in 1998, when he became a junior teaching assistant. He became a teaching assistant in 2000, a lecturer in 2003, an associate professor in 2007 and, starting from 2015, he is a full-time professor at the Bucharest Academy of Economic Studies, where he teaches Macroeconomics and Microeconomics. In 2005, he founded the first Institutional economics course in Romania, addressing the role of institutions for economic development, and published an Institutional economics textbook. At the same time, he brought an important contribution to the area of Institutional economics through research and analysis work focused on interpreting the transition process and the EU integration through an institutional perspective. He also co-authored several editions of the economics textbook published by the Department of Economics at the Bucharest Academy of Economic Studies.

Marinescu has led economic research projects since 2005. Over time, he won numerous research grant competitions and conducted research work on topics such as institutions, economic freedom, and quality of the business environment. In 2011-2012, he obtained a postdoctoral scholarship from the Romanian Academy - “Costin C. Kirițescu” National Institute of Economic Research and, as part of this project, he was invited by Claude Ménard as visiting researcher at Centre d’Economie de la Sorbonne (in June 2012). Previously, he conducted research work also at ESCP Europe (June 2010), Middlesex University (April 2008), Institut d'Administration des Entreprises Lille (June 2002), and Maison des Sciences Economiques (October 2001).

Marinescu has published a large number of books and papers as coordinator, author, and coauthor, on different topics, the most important being: “Education: an Economic Perspective” (2001), “Liberalization of Foreign Economic Exchanges” (2003), “Institutions and Prosperity. From Ethics to Efficiency” (2004), “Performance in the Context of Lisbon Agenda” (2006), “Market Economy. Institutional Foundations of Prosperity” (2007), “Economic Freedom and Property” (2011), “Capitalism. The Logic of Liberty” (2012), “Transaction Costs and Economic Performance” (2013). In 2008, Marinescu received the "Third Prize for Economic Literature" from the Association of Economic Faculties in Romania. His book, Capitalism. The Logic of Liberty, published by Humanitas Publishing House and constructed as a collection of essays aiming to explain and defend the true logic of capitalism and economic freedom, was selected as "The Book of the Year 2013" at Wall-street.ro Gala. The book also received the support and endorsement of famous international members of the academia, such as Pascal Salin, Leszek Balcerowicz, János Kornai, Walter Block, Vasile Ișan and Aurelian Dochia.

Marinescu is accused of plagiarism by RePEc plagiarism committee. He has a double plagiarism accusation so far.

=== Professional ===
Between 2013 and 2014, Marinescu was the Vice-president of the Commission for Budget and Finance of the National Liberal Party, where he contributed to the development of government policies and programs. He was the Advisor to the Romanian Minister of Economy, Trade and Business Environment in 2012, and the Advisor to the Romanian Minister of Public Finance in 2013. he also served as the Economic Advisor to the President of the National Liberal Party between June and December 2014. On 22 December 2014, he was appointed Presidential Advisor on Economic and Social Policy to the President of Romania. H

In 2008, Marinescu founded the Centre for Economics and Liberty - ECOL, a Romanian non-profit educational and research initiative that gathers together students, researchers and professors with the aim of promoting, in Romania, the principles of a free economy and society. ECOL reflects the initiatives of a group of young intellectuals whose scientific and editorial interests aim to enhance and disseminate the knowledge regarding the workings of economics and society. The Centre publishes regularly economic articles and studies, as well as translations of famous international texts. He publishes constantly in leading Romanian newspapers, magazines, and online platforms, such as Ziarul Financiar, Bursa, Hotnews.ro, and Contributors
