= MIAX Pearl Equities =

American exchange and clearing house company

- Type: Stock exchange
- Location: Princeton, New Jersey, United States
- Founded: September 2020; 5 years ago
- Owner: Miami International Holdings
- Currency: United States dollar
- Website: MIAX Pearl Equities

MIAX Pearl Equities (MIAX), is an American stock exchange headquartered in Princeton, New Jersey. The exchange also has offices in Miami, Florida, where its parent company Miami International Holdings is based.

== History ==
In March 2019, financial conglomerate and exchange operator Miami International Holdings (MIH), announced plans to launch a new US stock exchange, which would later become MIAX Pearl Equities. Prior to this, MIH had already set up three equity options exchanges in the US. According to then-Chairman and CEO Tom Gallagher, MIH hoped to complement its options offerings and later break into the listings business.

On August 18, 2020, the Securities Exchange Commission approved MIH's filing to register the stock exchange, paving the way for its launch.

MIAX Pearl Equities was launched in September 2020, in the same month as the Long-Term Stock Exchange and Members Exchange. This brought the total number of US stock exchanges at the time to 16, with MIAX Pearl Equities being the latest entrant.

Initially, the exchange raised $22 million by selling prepaid blocks of fees to a group of market makers that included Citadel Securities and UBS. The exchange also waived fees for market data and offered a rebate of 32 cents per 100 shares for market makers to display orders on the platform, a level which sits toward the higher end of what incumbent exchanges such as the New York Stock Exchange and Nasdaq offered, in hopes of gaining market share and trading volume.

The exchange began trading on September 29, 2020, initially offering only a single low-volume symbol, Netgear (NTGR), before gradually expanding to all US listed stocks.

In May 2022, MIAX's parent company Miami International Holdings announced that it had confidentially submitted paperwork with the regulators for a U.S. IPO.

== Operations ==
=== Fees ===
MIAX Pearl Equities is positioned as a lower cost alternative to its larger rivals such as NYSE and Nasdaq.

The exchange also incentivizes a group of nine high-speed market makers, using a system of rebates or special fees, to provide liquidity on its platform.

=== Clearing ===
As of April 2024, clearing members of the exchange include major banks such as Goldman Sachs and JP Morgan, and also equity market makers such as Jane Street Capital and Hudson River Trading.

=== National Market System ===
The exchange is a participant of several National Market System plans, including the Consolidated Tape Association, Unlisted Trading Privileges, Consolidated Audit Trail (CTA), and Limit Up-Limit Down (LULD).

=== Market data ===
Through its affiliate Bermuda Stock Exchange, MIAX Pearl Equities publishes its market data to the Pyth Network, a decentralized service that provides real-time market data on the Solana blockchain.

=== Matching engine ===
The exchange's trading system is situated in the Equinix NY4 data center in Secaucus, New Jersey.

== Products ==
- Stocks
- Exchange-traded funds (ETFs)

== See also ==
- Miami International Holdings
