= ZST (disambiguation) =

ZST is a Japanese mixed martial arts promotion.

ZST may also refer to:

== Computer filenames ==
- .zst, for Zstandard compressed files
- .zst, for ZSNES games console emulator save files

== Transport ==
- Stewart Aerodrome (IATA: ZST), British Columbia, Canada
- MG ZST, a 2020 Australian car model
- ZST, the car plate district indicator for Stargard County, Poland

== Other uses ==
- ZST, a Canadian exchange-traded fund
- Zst, the mineral symbol for zincostaurolite
