= Bernard Guerrien =

French economist

- Born: 2 February 1943 (age 83); Bahía Blanca, Argentina
- Occupations: Economist and author

Academic background
- Thesis: Les fondements théoriques de la notion de flexibilité (1989)
- Doctoral advisor: Claude Ménard

Bernard Guerrien (born 2 February 1943) is a French economist and the author of La Théorie des jeux (2002), Dictionnaire d'analyse économique (2002), and La théorie économique néoclassique. macroéconomie, théorie des jeux, tome 2 (1999).

He is the starting force behind the Post-autistic economics movement that began in France.

== Biography ==
Guerrien was born in Argentina and holds a double Argentine and French citizenship.

He obtained a postgraduate doctorate in mathematics and statistics (specializing in econometrics) from the Faculty of Sciences in Paris, on the subject of Research into a typology of neighborhoods and economic activities.

He obtained a PhD in economics from Paris 1 Panthéon-Sorbonne University under the supervision of Claude Ménard in 1989, with a thesis on the theoretical foundations of the concept of flexibility (Les fondements théoriques de la notion de flexibilité).

He taught mathematics, Microeconomics, and economic theory at Paris 1 Panthéon-Sorbonne University, where he spent his entire career.

He is currently a research associate at SAMOS-MATISSE.

== Publications ==
=== Articles ===
- Putting an End to the Aggregated Function of Production... Forever?
- Is There Anything Worth Keeping in Standard Microeconomics?
- A Reply to Katzner and Case
- Fama-Shiller, Economic Sciences Prize Committee and the "Efficient Markets Hypothesis"
- Efficient Markets Hypothesis: What Are We Talking About?
- Is There Something to Expect from Game Theory?
- Competition and Zero Profit: A Big Mess. On the Inconsistencies of the Neo-classical Theory of Income Distribution

== Related links ==
- Bernard Guerrien's internet site
- Autisme-Economie.org Website of the French students movement for a reform of the teaching in economics (English section)
- Petition that started the PAE movement in 2000
- Post Autistic Network
