= Central Bank of Curaçao and Sint Maarten =

Coordinates: 12.1080°N 68.9284°W

Central Bank of Curaçao and Sint Maarten Centrale Bank van Curaçao en Sint Maarten

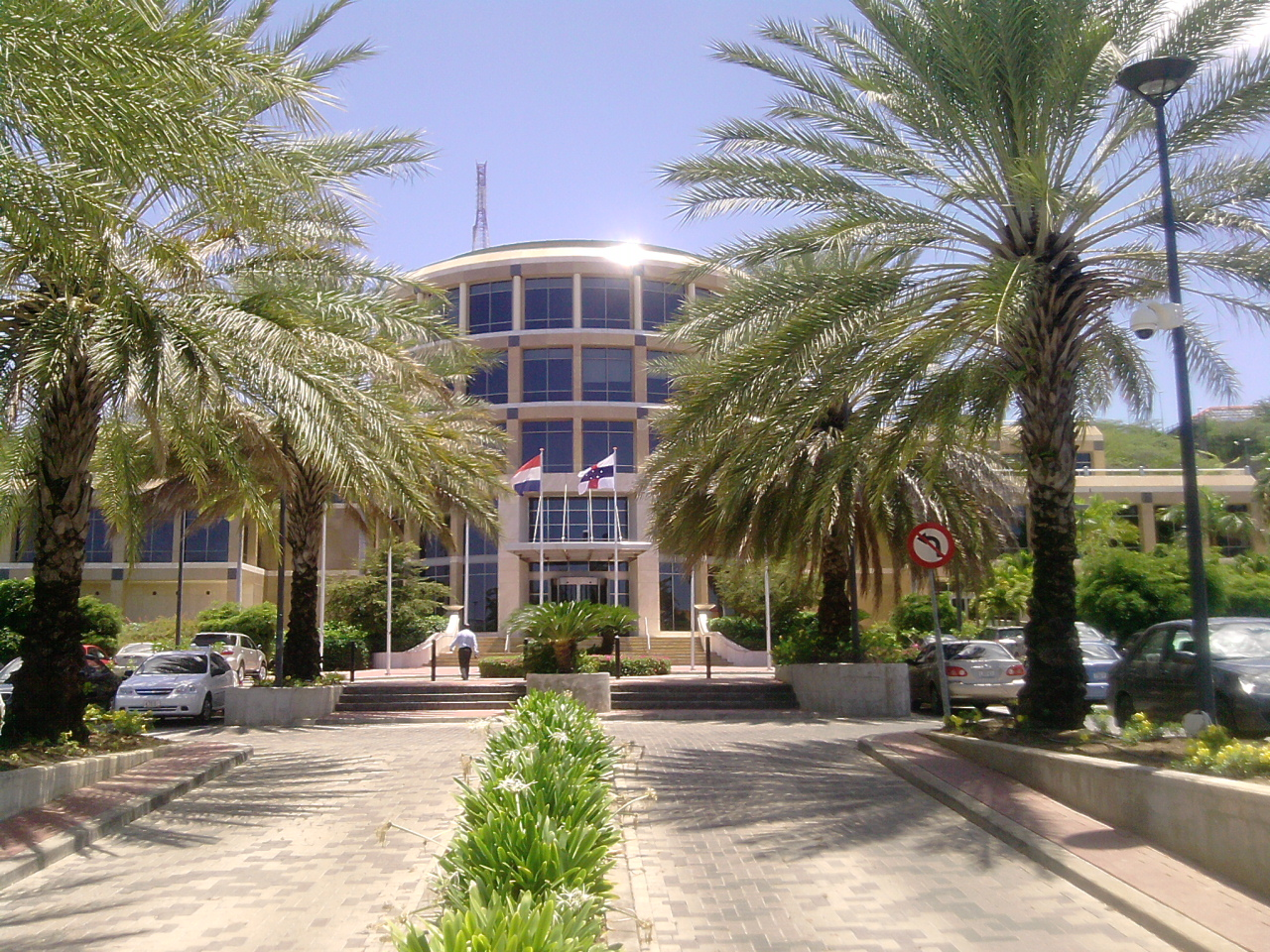
- The building of the Bank of the Netherlands Antilles in 2010.
- Central bank of: Curaçao and Sint Maarten
- Headquarters: Willemstad, Curaçao
- Established: 6 February 1828; 198 years ago
- Ownership: State ownership
- President: Richard Doornbosch
- Currency: Caribbean guilder XCG (ISO 4217)
- Website: www.centralbank.cw

The Central Bank of Curaçao and Sint Maarten (CBCS; Dutch: Centrale Bank van Curaçao en Sint Maarten; previously the Bank of the Netherlands Antilles) is the central bank for the Caribbean guilder and administers the monetary policy of Curaçao and Sint Maarten. The bank dates to 1828 making it the oldest surviving central bank in the Americas. The bank was also responsible for the Netherlands Antillean guilder until it was withdrawn on July 1, 2025.

Prior to the dissolution of the Netherlands Antilles in October 2010, the bank was responsible for monetary policy and currency throughout the Netherlands Antilles. When the BES islands became subject to the De Nederlandsche Bank, its present name was adopted. The bank replaced the Netherlands Antillean guilder with the Caribbean guilder in 2025.

There was controversy around the CBCS regarding corruption, most notably due to former CBCS president Emsley Tromp's connections to John Deuss and Hushang Ansary. Tromp was fired from his position in 2017.

== See also ==
- Central Bank of Aruba
- Central banks and currencies of the Caribbean
- Dutch Caribbean Securities Exchange
- Economy of Curaçao
- Economy of the Netherlands Antilles
- List of central banks
- List of financial supervisory authorities by country
