= Miami International Holdings =

American exchange and clearing house company

Miami International Holdings, Inc.
- Trade name: MIAX
- Industry: Business services Financial services Financial markets Technology
- Founded: 2007; 19 years ago
- Founder: Thomas P. Gallagher
- Headquarters: Princeton, New Jersey, U.S.
- Key people: Thomas P Gallagher (Chairman and CEO)
- Products: Clearing; Exchange Listing; Financial Data
- Revenue: ▲US$1.36 billion (2025)
- Net income: ▼ −US$70.0 million (2025)
- Subsidiaries: MIAX; MIAX Pearl; MIAX Pearl Equities; MIAX Emerald; Bermuda Stock Exchange; Minneapolis Grain Exchange; Dorman Trading
- Website: www.miaxglobal.com

Miami International Holdings, Inc. (MIH), trading as MIAX, is an American company formed in 2007 that operates global financial exchanges and execution services.

The company owns a number of U.S. exchanges for equities, equity options, and commodities. These include the MIAX Exchange Group — which is composed of MIAX, MIAX Pearl, MIAX Pearl Equities, MIAX Emerald, and MIAX Sapphire — and the Minneapolis Grain Exchange (MGEX). It also owns the Bermuda Stock Exchange and Dorman Trading, a Futures Commission Merchant. MIH also has a subsidiary, Miami International Technologies, which is focused on the sale and licensing of trading technology developed by MIAX Exchange Group. The firm was also the owner of LedgerX, an exchange and clearinghouse for derivatives contracts in digital currencies in the U.S., but sold 90% of its position in it.

Despite its name, MIH is headquartered in Princeton, New Jersey.

== History ==
MIH launched the Miami International Securities Exchange (MIAX) in 2012, after receiving approval from the U.S. Securities and Exchange Commission (SEC).

The company received approval from the SEC and launched MIAX Pearl Equities, MIH's first equities exchange, in 2020. MIAX Pearl Equities received backing and support from member firms such as IMC Financial Markets, Susquehanna International Group, Two Sigma Investments, Hudson River Trading, and Chicago Trading Company. The exchange also became a participant in the UTP Plan.

In 2022, MIH acquired Dorman Trading, a full-service Futures Commission Merchant registered with the Commodity Futures Trading Commission (CFTC). Subsequently, the company filed for a U.S. initial public offering with the SEC. MIH's equities exchange, MIAX Pearl Equities, reached a market share of 0.99% at the end of the same year. In May 2023, MIH acquired LedgerX from the FTX bankruptcy estate; MIH later sold a 90% stake in the company in January 2026, retaining a 10% minority share.

On October 17, 2023, MIH announced that it had filed the Form 1 application to the SEC to register MIAX Sapphire, a new exchange for U.S. options. The exchange commenced trading operations in the third quarter of 2024.

In November 2023, MIH announced plans to open a new options trading pit and offices in Miami's Wynwood neighborhood, which would house MIH's new trading venue, MIAX Sapphire. The new exchange, MIH's fourth options exchange, would include a physical trading floor in Miami, the first of its kind. Delays pushed the physical trading floor opening to 2025

In 2024, the firm named former Citadel Securities executive Troy Kane CEO of its newly-formed futures business, MIAX Futures. Later in August 2024, MIH secured a $100 million investment from private equity firm Warburg Pincus to fund continued global expansion, including the construction of a physical trading floor in Miami for MIAX Sapphire and the growth of its agricultural and financial futures businesses.

MIAX venues rely heavily on equity-rights programs where firms receive stakes for meeting volume thresholds, creating a high structural concentration on institutional partners.

=== Infrastructure outages ===
The MIAX Exchange Group has experienced intermittent network disruptions affecting market access, , which required participants to reroute orders.

=== Initial public offering ===
The company went public on August 14, 2025, listing on the New York Stock Exchange with the ticker symbol "MIAX". Shares of the stock jumped 38% from their IPO price on its debut, valuing the company at about $2.5 billion as it raised $345 million.

=== Acquisition of MGEX ===
In 2020, the company acquired MGEX, which was known for its signature wheat contracts. MIH subsequently renamed the market as MIAX Futures Exchange in 2024.

=== Financial futures ===
In September 2025, the company announced its plans to launch financial futures on MIAX Futures using its proprietary Onyx trading platform.

== Lawsuits ==
In 2017, Nasdaq brought forward a lawsuit against MIH claiming the latter used trade secrets to create MIAX's trading platforms and obtain a patent. In its suit, Nasdaq alleged that at least 15 of its former employees joined MIH and that three of them had forwarded technical documents to their personal emails before joining the rival firm. MIH countered with its own suits, arguing that seven of Nasdaq's existing patents tried asserted claim over the invention of options trading.

In 2020, Cboe Global Markets sued to block MIH from offering SPIKES volatility index futures on its MIAX options exchanges. Cboe contested an SEC exemptive order allowing SPIKES futures to trade via the Minneapolis Grain Exchange (MGEX) without standard security futures classifications. Critics noted this exemption gave SPIKES an operational and tax advantage over Cboe's VIX. The D.C. Circuit ruled for Cboe in July 2023, vacating the SEC order due to insufficient competition justification. The litigation loss removed MGEX's primary proprietary product and halted MIH's market competition. MGEX suspended and officially delisted SPIKES futures on December 29, 2023. The delisting eliminated open interest, and removed SPIKES from the rulebook.

== See also ==
- Unlisted Trading Privileges
- Options Price Reporting Authority
- List of stock exchanges in the Americas
- CCP Global
