= VGFC =

VGFC may refer to:

- The Very Good Food Company, a vegan food company
- Vermont Green FC, an American environmentally-focused soccer club
