= DQD =

DQD or dqd can refer to:

- Ornithorhynchidae, a family that contains the platypus and its extinct evolutionary relatives, by Catalogue of Life code
- Double Quantum Dot, a quantum device used e.g. for quantum technology
- WisdomTree U.S. Quality Dividend Growth Variably Hedged Index ETF™, a Canadian exchange-traded fund; see List of Canadian exchange-traded funds
- dqd, an operation on polyhedrons in Conway polyhedron notation
