= United Stock Exchange of India =

Indian stock exchange in Mumbai

United Stock Exchange of India Limited
- Type: Stock Exchange
- Location: Mumbai, Maharashtra, India
- Coordinates: 19°3′37″N 72°51′35″E
- Founded: 20 September 2010
- Owner: Government of India
- Key people: Mr. Dipak Chatterjee ( Chairman of Board of Directors)
- Currency: Indian rupee (₹)
- Website: www.useindia.com

United Stock Exchange of India Limited, also known as the United Stock Exchange (USE), is an Indian government owned stock exchange. It is the 4th pan-India exchange launched for trading financial instruments in India. USE represents the commitment of 21 Indian public sector banks, private banks, international banks and corporate houses to build an institution of repute. Mr. Gaurav Arora and Jaypee Capital were the founders and main promoters of the exchange.

Public Sector Banks that are stakeholders of USE include Allahabad Bank, Corporation Bank, Punjab National Bank, Andhra Bank, Dena Bank, State Bank of India, Bank of Baroda, IDBI Bank, Syndicate Bank, Bank of India, Indian Bank, UCO Bank, Bank of Maharashtra, Indian Overseas Bank, Union Bank of India, Canara Bank, Oriental Bank of Commerce, United Bank of India, Central Bank of India, Punjab and Sind Bank, Vijaya Bank.

Private Sector Banks like Axis Bank, Yes Bank, Federal Bank, J & K Bank, HDFC Bank and ICICI Bank are also stakeholders in USE. Corporate Institutions such as MMTC and India Potash are also associated with United Stock Exchange.

USE launched its operations on 20 Sept 2010. On the first day of operations, USE cornered 52 percent market share and created a record of highest volumes traded in currency futures in a single day.

== Products and services ==
USE began operations in the future contracts in each of the following currency pairs:

- United States Dollar-Indian Rupee (USD-INR)
- Euro-Indian Rupee (EUR-INR)
- Pound Sterling-Indian Rupee (GBP-INR)
- Japanese Yen-Indian Rupee (JPY-INR)

There would be 12 contracts i.e. one for each of the next 12 months in each of the above currency pair Outright contracts as well as calendar spread contracts are available in each pair for trading

USE also started trading in USD-INR currency options in 2011 and became the second Indian exchange to trade in currency options

USE has applied for permission to start operating in the debt segment

== Membership ==
All transactions on USE must be carried out through registered members. All non-member participants can access the exchange as clients of members. Membership is therefore granted to market participants with high credibility and an excellent track record. Members will need to meet all requirements prescribed by the Securities Exchange Board of India (SEBI) as also the requirements stipulated by USE itself. This is to ensure that traders are protected against any counterparty risk and also to help develop and build market confidence.

Two types of membership is available with USE

- Trading Membership: Trading Member has the privilege of trading on one’s own account as well as the accounts of their clients. However, they will not be able to clear and settle these trades. Net worth criteria as per SEBI: ₹1 Crore
- Clearing Membership: Clearing Members are entitled to clear and settle trades for all trading members through the Clearing House of USE, ICCL. Net worth criteria as per SEBI: 5 Crore INR for Self Clearing Member and 10 Crore for Professional Clearing Member

USE has more than 400 trading members, more than 50 clearing members and 10 clearing banks. Membership, details available on Membership Details

Currently, USE charges transaction fees

Transaction Charges (futures contracts) (Rs. per crore of Traded Value)

Up to ₹1250 crore ₹95

More than ₹1251 crore to ₹2500 crore ₹75

More than ₹2501 crore to ₹3750 crore ₹60

More than ₹3751 crore to ₹5000 crore ₹45

More than ₹5001 crore to ₹6250 crore ₹30

More than ₹6251 crore to ₹7500 crore ₹20

More than ₹7501 crore to ₹10,000 crore ₹10

More than ₹10,001 crore ₹05

Transaction Charges (options contracts) (Rs. per crore of Premium Value)

Up to first ₹5 crore ₹75/Lakh each side

More than ₹5 crore up to ₹25 crore ₹4500/crore each side

More than ₹25 crore up to ₹50 crore ₹4000/crore each side

More than ₹50 crore up to ₹75 crore ₹2000/crore each side

More than ₹75 crore ₹1500/crore each side

== See also ==
- List of stock exchanges in the Commonwealth of Nations
