= The Very Good Food Company =

Canadian vegan food company

- Company type: Public
- Traded as: TSX-V: VERY; Nasdaq: VGFC
- Industry: Food
- Founded: 2017; 9 years ago
- Founder: Mitchell Scott, James Davison
- Defunct: February 24, 2023
- Headquarters: Victoria, BC, Canada
- Website: verygoodbutchers.com

The Very Good Food Company was a meat alternative and vegan cheese company in British Columbia, Canada. The company started in 2017 and appeared on the television show Dragon's Den in 2018. In 2018, they successfully raised $600,000 from 240 local investors through Canadian equity-crowdfunding platform FrontFundr. The plant-based meat alternatives they sold were known as the Very Good Butchers while the cheeses were known as The Very Good Cheese Company.

The company was listed on the Canadian Securities Exchange (CSE) and the American Nasdaq exchange. This started in June 2020 with 16.1 million shares.

The company announced on February 2, 2023 that they would be ceasing operations and would be selling off assets.
