= Eastern Caribbean Central Securities Registry =

The Eastern Caribbean Central Securities Registry (ECCSR) is the central securities depository for the securities traded on the Eastern Caribbean Securities Exchange (ECSE). It is a wholly owned subsidiary of the ECSE, part of the Organisation of Eastern Caribbean States.

The depository is based in Basseterre in Saint Kitts and Nevis.

== See also ==
- Economy of the Organisation of Eastern Caribbean States
