= Börse =

Börse may refer to:

== Stock exchanges ==
- Deutsche Börse
- Wiener Börse
- Berliner Börse
- Börse München
- Börse Stuttgart
- Frankfurt Stock Exchange

== Other ==
- The Stock Exchange (book) (Die Börse)

== See also ==
- Bourse (disambiguation)
- List of European stock exchanges
- Eurex
