= Minneapolis Grain Exchange =

Commodities and futures exchange in Minnesota, US

- Type: Subsidiary
- Industry: Business services
- Founded: 1881; 145 years ago
- Headquarters: Minneapolis
- Products: Futures and options
- Parent: Miami International Holdings
- Website: Official website
- Minneapolis Grain Exchange
- U.S. National Register of Historic Places
- Minneapolis Landmark
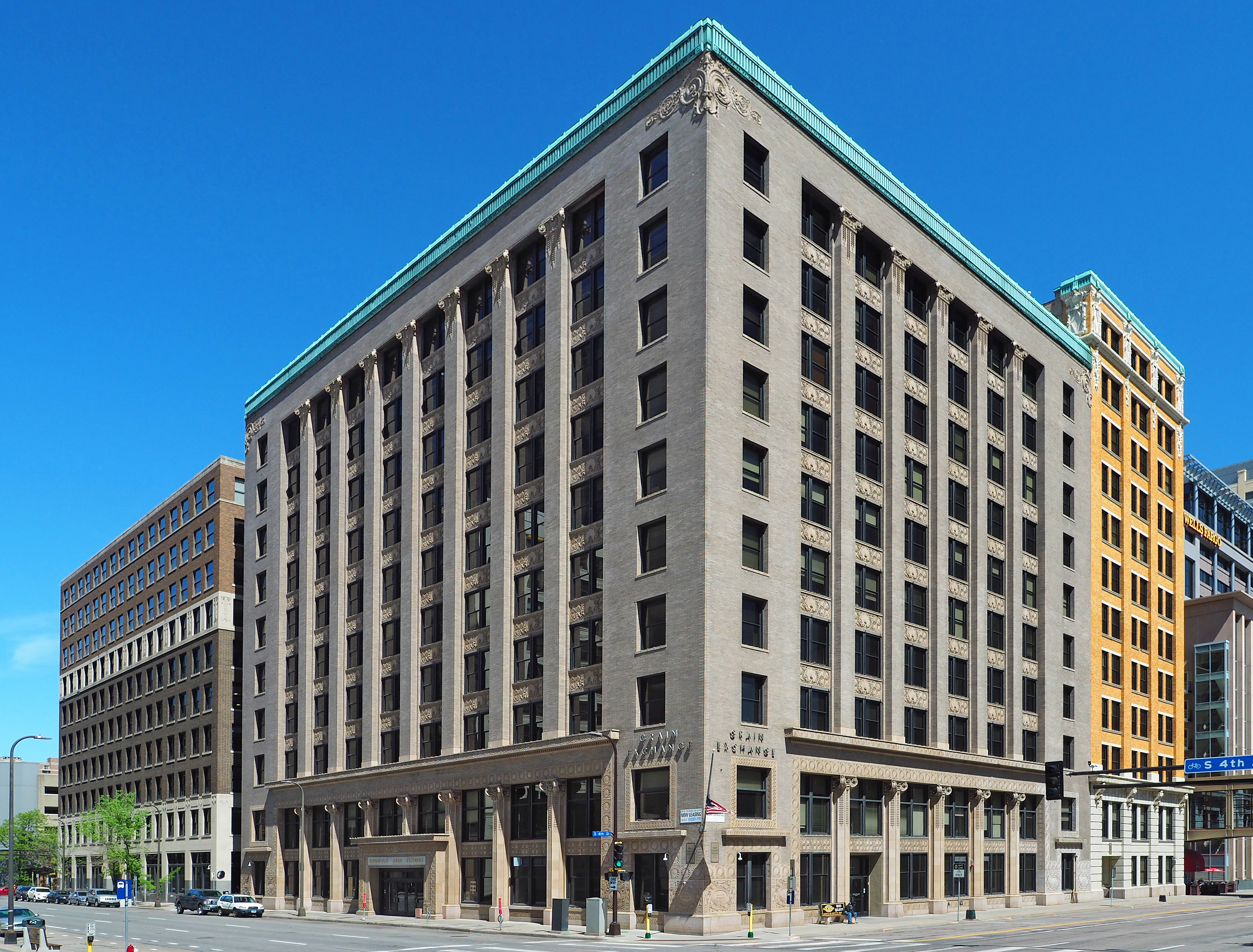
- The three-building Minneapolis Grain Exchange viewed from the west
- Location: 400 and 412 S. 4th St and 301 4th Ave. S., Minneapolis, Minnesota
- Coordinates: 44°58′39″N 93°15′49″W
- Built: 1881 as Chamber of Commerce
- Architect: Kees and Colburn (main building, 1902), Long, Lamoreaux & Long (east building, 1909), and Bertrand and Chamberlain (north building, 1928)
- Architectural style: Sullivanesque
- NRHP reference No.: 95000821

Significant dates
- Added to NRHP: November 23, 1977
- Designated MPLSL: 1977

The Minneapolis Grain Exchange (MGEX) is a commodities and futures exchange of grain products. It was formed in 1881 in Minneapolis, Minnesota, United States as a regional cash marketplace to promote fair trade and to prevent trade abuses in wheat, oats and corn. MGEX became a subsidiary of Miami International Holdings after the two companies merged in 2020.

MGEX has been the principal market for Hard Red Spring Wheat (HRSW) since 1881, offering futures and options contracts based on its unique commodity. HRSW is one of the highest-protein wheats. It is found in bagels, pizzas, high-quality breads and cereals, and some noodles and cookies. It is planted mostly in the U.S. Northern Plains and the Canadian Prairies.

== Operations ==
MGEX offers five financially settled agricultural index products: Hard Red Spring Wheat Index (HRSI), Hard Red Winter Wheat Index (HRWI), Soft Red Winter Wheat Index (SRWI), National Corn Index (NCI) and National Soybean Index (NSI).

In an agreement with Data Transmission Network (now Telvent DTN), a business-to-business electronic commerce and information services company in Omaha, Nebraska, MGEX has exclusive rights to DTN's agriculture and weather data bases, which the exchange uses to develop index products.

Futures are traded exclusively electronically on the CME Globex platform. Options are traded side-by-side.

== History ==
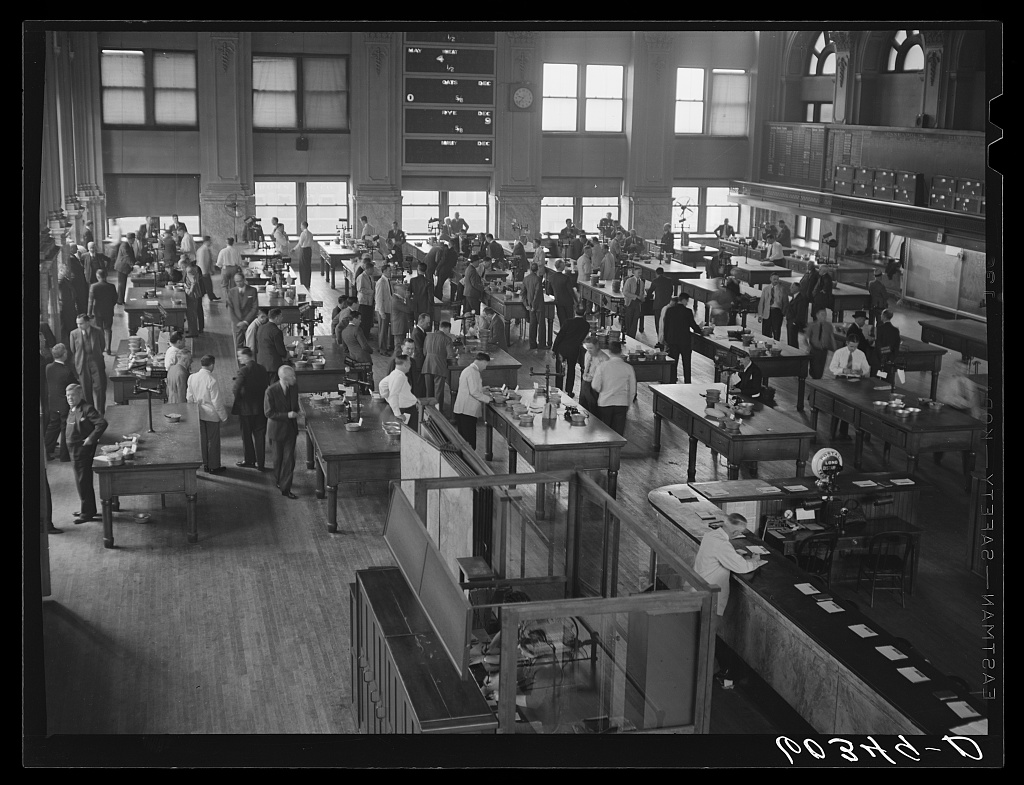
Interior c. 1939

Founded as the Minneapolis Chamber of Commerce in 1881, the MGEX has been a marketplace for producers, processors and millers for more than 125 years. The three Grain Exchange buildings in downtown Minneapolis are now listed on the National Register of Historic Places.

In 1883, the Chamber of Commerce introduced its first futures contract: hard red spring wheat. By 1946 "Chamber of Commerce" had become synonymous with organizations devoted mainly to civic and social issues. In 1947, the exchange was renamed the Minneapolis Grain Exchange. Today the exchange is most recognized by its logo and uses MGEX as first reference.

On December 19, 2008, the Minneapolis Grain Exchange ceased operations of the open outcry trading floor, but continues daily operations for the electronic processing of financial transactions. Today, HRSW futures trade exclusively electronically and options trade side-by-side.

== Ownership ==
In 2022, MGEX was owned by Miami International Holdings.

== See also ==
- MF Global
