= Canadian Securities Exchange =

Stock exchange in Toronto, Canada

- Type: Stock Exchange
- Location: Toronto, Ontario, Canada
- Founded: 2001
- Owner: CNSX Markets Inc.
- Key people: Richard Carleton (CEO)
- Currency: CAD
- No. of listings: 778 (April, 2022)
- Market cap: $35.46 billion (April, 2022)
- Volume: 7.4 billion shares YTD (April, 2022)
- Website: www.thecse.com

Canadian Securities Exchange (CSE; French: La Bourse des valeurs canadiennes), operated by CNSX Inc., is a stock exchange domiciled in Canada. When recognized by the Ontario Securities Commission in 2004, CSE was the first exchange approved in Ontario in 70 years.

The CSE lists securities issues by public companies, including emerging and growth-stage companies. It operates as a regulated Canadian stock exchange and provides a marketplace for trading listed securities.

Designed to meet the needs of emerging public companies and their investors, CSE has experienced rapid growth over the last five years and lists over 700 securities.

In February 2015, the CSE Composite Index was launched as a broad indicator of market activity for the CSE. The CSE Composite Index is a market capitalization weighted benchmark reflecting the performance of CSE listed securities meeting index eligibility requirements. The Composite Index is uniquely positioned to gauge the Canadian small cap market. Reuters and Bloomberg publish CSE composite index under the ticker CSECOMP. The Index provides a distinctly different risk/return profile compared to the TSX/S&P Composite. The CSE25 Index is a subset of the CSE Composite Index containing the securities of the twenty-five largest Index companies by market capitalization.

The CSE is located in Toronto, Ontario, and maintains a branch office in Vancouver, British Columbia.

== Hours ==
The exchange's normal trading sessions are from 9:30 a.m. to 4:00 p.m. ET on all days of the week except Saturdays, Sundays, and holidays declared by the Exchange in advance.

== Ownership ==
As at March 31, 2021, Urbana Corporation reported that it holds 49.25% of CNSX Inc. common shares. The remaining shares are widely held and include various funds as well as former and current CSE employees.

== See also ==
- System for Electronic Document Analysis and Retrieval (SEDAR)
- Montreal Exchange
- Nasdaq Canada
- Toronto Stock Exchange
- TSX Venture Exchange
- Winnipeg Commodity Exchange
- List of stock exchanges
- List of stock exchanges in the Americas
- Previous logo
  List of stock exchanges in the Commonwealth of Nations
