= Brusa =

Brusa may refer to:

== Places ==
- Brusa, historical name of the city Bursa in Turkey
  - Prusa (Bithynia), also called Prousa or (Ancient Greek: Προῦσα), ancient name of Bursa

== People with the surname ==
- Anselme Brusa (1899–1969), Italian-Swiss-French rower
- Elisabetta Brusa (born 1954), Italian composer

== Other uses ==
- 1943 BRUSA Agreement between the British and American governments in cypher cracking
- Brusa (butterfly), a genus of butterfly in the grass skipper family
- Brusa Elektronik, a Swiss manufacturer of electric motors and power electronics; see Volvo C30 § C30 DRIVe Electric (2011-2013)

== See also ==
- Bursa (disambiguation)
