= Guyana Stock Exchange =

Stock exchange in Guyana

The Guyana Stock Exchange (GSE) is a stock exchange located in Georgetown, Guyana. It lists 15 registered companies, and trading takes place each Monday via word of mouth on the trading floor supported by an electronic limit order book. The Guyana Stock Exchange is operated by the Guyana Association of Securities Companies and Intermediaries Inc. (GASCI) and is regulated by the Guyana Securities Council. Market capitalisation of local stocks in November 2021 stood at 568,639,217,573 GYD (US$2.72 billion).

The first trades took place June 30, 2003 with 12 companies on the register. In 2007, Trinidad Cement Ltd of Trinidad and Tobago was the first company to officially list in the GSE, as well as to be the first non-Guyanese company to register with the exchange although they have since delisted. In 2019, plans for the first agribusiness IPO were announced, but have stalled due to the COVID pandemic.

The Lucas Stock Index is published weekly by Stabroek News, and is composed of nine major stocks on the exchange.

In 2019, The Guyana Stock Exchange penned a memorandum of cooperation with the Barbados Stock Exchange to facilitate cross-listing between the two countries. The agreement also prompted discussion about moving to an electronic payment system and reforming the 1998 Securities Industry Act to improve supervision and reduce risk.

== See also ==
- Guyana
- List of stock exchanges
- List of stock exchanges in the Americas
- List of stock exchanges in the Commonwealth of Nations
