= Bourse =

Bourse may refer to:

- Exchange (organized market) or bourse
- Stock exchange or bourse

== Exchanges ==
- Bourse de Bruxelles or Brussels Stock Exchange (BSE), Belgium
- Bourse Palace, the BSE's former building
- Bourse de Montreal, Canada
- Paris Bourse, a historical stock exchange in France
- Deutsche Bourse or Deutsche Börse, a stock exchange in Frankfurt am Main, Germany
- Bharat Diamond Bourse, a diamond exchange in Mumbai, India
- Borsa Italiana, a stock exchange in Milan, Italy
- Bourse de Luxembourg
- Bourse de Casablanca, Morocco
- Bourse (Gothenburg), a former mercantile exchange in Sweden
- Bourse de Tunis, Tunisia
- Philadelphia Bourse, a former stock exchange in Pennsylvania, US
- Bourse des Valeurs d'Abidjan, a former stock exchange in the francophone West African countries

== Other uses ==
- Bourse station, a Paris Metro station
- Bourse de Travail, a French labor council
- La Bourse, a short story by Honoré de Balzac
- The 2nd arrondissement of Paris, also known as Bourse

== See also ==
- Börse (disambiguation)
