= The Stock Exchange (book) =

1896 book by Max Weber

The Stock Exchange (in German: Die Börse) is an 1896 book written by Max Weber.

During the 1890s, the stock exchange had become the symbol of capitalism in Germany. From 1894 to 1896, Weber wrote a number of essays about stock exchange, in which he argued against the popular view that the stock exchange was a fraudulent enterprise designed to abuse "the honest working people".

Weber in his research on the stock exchange concentrated on two subjects. First, he showed that commercialization could help create or destroy cultural values, sometimes doing both at the same time – it had destroyed the values of patriarchalism, but created the opportunities for farm workers. The stock exchange itself has facilitated the expansion of trade, but at the same time it did allow for new ways of crime and abuse. Second, Weber showed that economic conduct was an integral part of ideas related to pursuing economic interests, but those ideas have to be viewed separately.
