= Bursa tumbler =

Breed of pigeon

The Bursa tumbler is a breed of fancy pigeon originating in Bursa, Turkey. Locally, the people are called “oynar” or “akkanat” – white wings. Bursa pigeons, along with other varieties of domesticated pigeons, are all descendants from the rock pigeon (Columba livia).

== See also ==
- List of pigeon breeds
