= Bourse des Valeurs d'Abidjan =

Stock exchange in Ivory Coast

The Abidjan Stock Exchange (French: Bourse des Valeurs d'Abidjan), Côte d'Ivoire, was the only stock exchange in the francophone West African countries until the formation of BRVM in 1998.

The Bourse des Valeurs d'Abidjan was established in 1974, started trading in 1976, and was closed at the end of December 1997.
