= Caribbean guilder =

Currency of Curaçao and Sint Maarten

Caribische gulden (Dutch); florin karibense (Papiamento); Cg
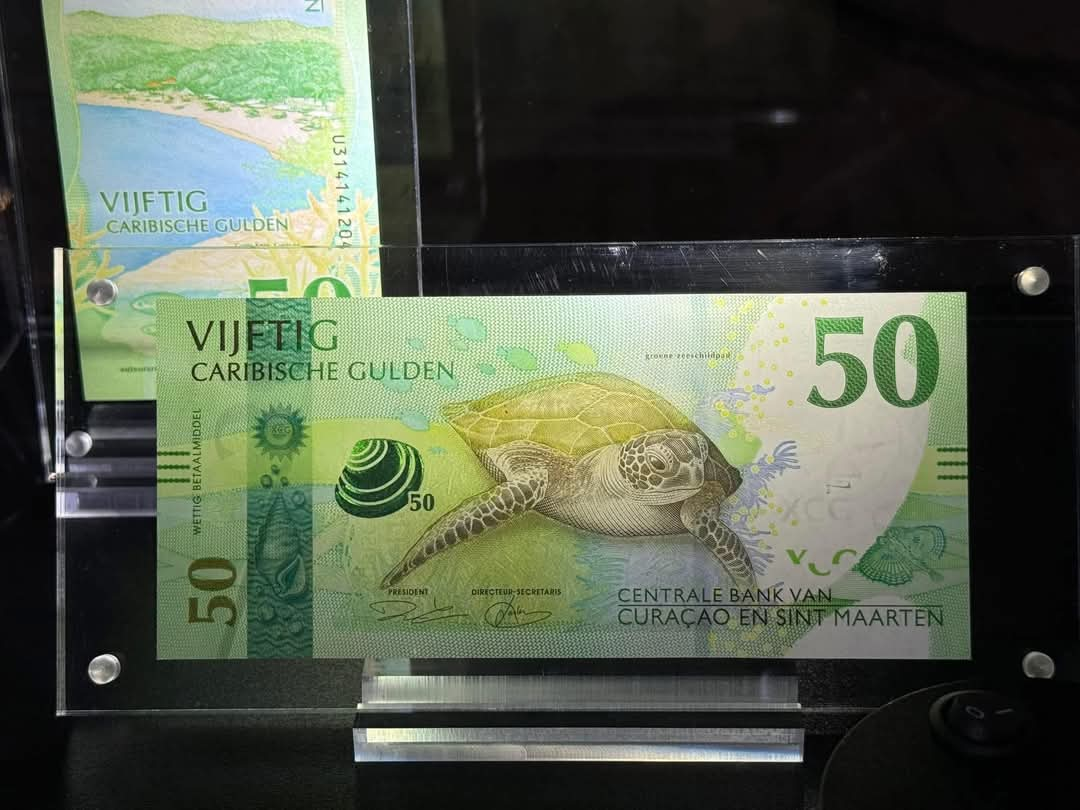
Banknote
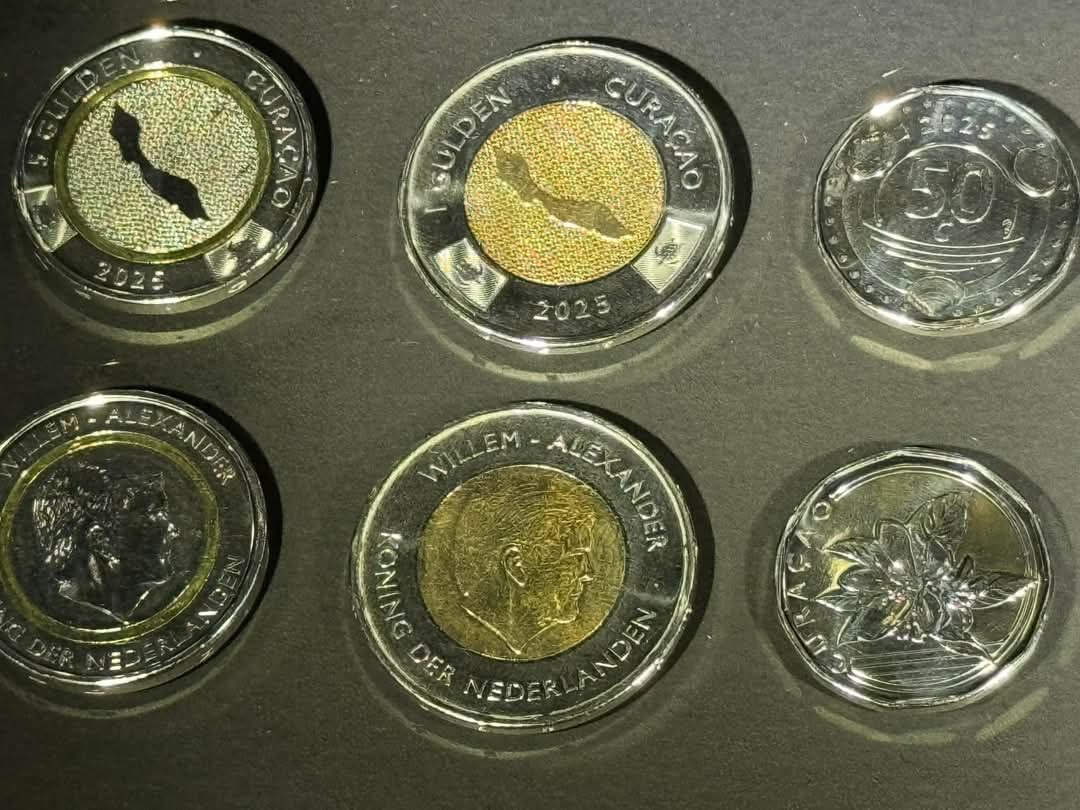
Coins

ISO 4217
- Code: XCG

Units of account
- Plural: guilders
- Subunit
- 1/100: cent
- Plural
- cent: cents
- Symbol
- cent: c

Denominations
- Banknotes: 10Cg, 20Cg, 50Cg, 100Cg, 200Cg
- Coins: 1c, 5c, 10c, 25c, 50c, 1Cg, 5Cg

Demographics
- Date of introduction: 31 March 2025
- Replaced: Netherlands Antillean guilder
- User(s): Curaçao; Sint Maarten

Issuance
- Central bank: Central Bank of Curaçao and Sint Maarten (CBCS)
- Website: www.centralbank.cw
- Printer: Crane Currency
- Website: www.cranecurrency.com
- Mint: Royal Canadian Mint
- Website: www.mint.ca

Valuation
- Pegged with: U.S. dollar = 1.79 XCG
- Exchange rate Euro: https://caribischegulden.nl/

The Caribbean guilder (code: XCG; abbreviation: Cg; Dutch: Caribische gulden; Papiamento: florin karibense) is the currency of Curaçao and Sint Maarten, two constituent countries of the Kingdom of the Netherlands. It is divided into 100 cents (Papiamento: sèn). Introduced on 31 March 2025, it replaced the Netherlands Antillean guilder (ANG), which ceased to be legal tender on 1 July 2025 after a period of co-circulation.

In November 2022, it was announced that the Caribbean guilder would come into circulation the following year, but it was delayed several times. The cost of the design and production of the Caribbean guilder was approximately 15 million ANG. ANG is exchangeable at par at commercial banks for the new currency for one year following introduction, and thereafter for 29 years at the Central Bank of Curaçao and Sint Maarten.

== Naming ==
The Caribbean guilder uses the ISO 4217 code of XCG, with the initial X used for supranational currencies, and retains the supplanted Netherlands Antillean guilder's (ANG) numeric code of 532. The Central Bank of Curaçao and Sint Maarten has announced its official abbreviation as Cg.

== History ==
The Netherlands Antillean guilder continued to circulate after the dissolution of the Netherlands Antilles and plans to implement the Caribbean guilder were not finalized until both countries would agree to have a common currency At the time, it was reported that the new currency would be abbreviated CMg (for Curaçao, Sint Maarten guilder) and would be pegged to the United States dollar at the same exchange rate as the Netherlands Antillean guilder (US$1 = 1.79 NAg = 1.79 CMg). As the BES islands (Bonaire, Sint Eustatius and Saba) adopted the U.S. dollar directly on 1 January 2011, the introduction of the CMg would have meant the end of the circulation of the Netherlands Antillean guilder.

In April 2014, Curaçao and Sint Maarten agreed to look into the possibility of Curaçao having its own central bank. As long as further negotiations continued, the Caribbean guilder would not be introduced. In July 2015, the Minister of Finance of Curaçao, José Jardim, stated that research on a monetary union between Curaçao and Sint Maarten was not a priority. Former Curaçao MP Alex David Rosaria said that a major problem with the proposed union was the lack of a forum to discuss macroeconomic coordination (as there is for the Eastern Caribbean dollar).

In 2019, the finance minister of Sint Maarten stated that there were only two years of reserve Antillean guilder banknotes remaining and that the islands would need to make a decision soon. The islands also considered adopting the U.S. dollar or euro.

In November 2019, Curaçao Minister of Finance Kenneth Gijsbertha confirmed the introduction of the Caribbean guilder in 2021, and the Central Bank officially announced it a year later. By August 2021, it was reported that the new guilder would have expected a launch in either 2023 or 2024. In September 2022, CBCS wanted the guilder introduced in 2024. Then by July 2023, that was postponed to 2025 at the latest. The currency was eventually introduced in March 2025.

== Organisation ==
The currency is issued by the Central Bank of Curaçao and Sint Maarten, which is chaired by a chairperson chosen by both islands' prime ministers. The two islands would also appoint six further members of the supervisory board of directors. The currency was phased in completely by August 2025.

== Coins and banknotes ==
The Caribbean guilder has coins minted by the Royal Canadian Mint in the following denominations: 5 guilders, 1 guilder, 50 cents, 25 cents, 10 cents, 5 cents, and 1 cent. Banknotes are printed by Crane Currency and made of cotton like the Antillean guilder but more durable, with denominations of 200 guilders, 100 guilders, 50 guilders, 20 guilders, and 10 guilders. The 2 1/2-guilder coin and the 25-guilder notes present in the Netherlands Antillean guilder series are not issued and 20 and 200 guilder banknotes are added. To deter counterfeiting, there was no public design competition for the currency. The designs for all coins and banknotes were unveiled on 22 August 2024 and depict marine life.

=== Coins ===
In February 2024, it was reported that the designs for the one-guilder and five-guilder coins had been approved. There are slight variations in the designs for Curaçao and Sint Maarten, with coins circulating interchangeably.

Coins of the Caribbean guilder
Image		Value	Technical parameters				Description			Date of	
Obverse	Reverse	Value	Diameter	Thickness	Mass	Composition	Edge	Obverse	Reverse	first minting	issue
		1c	15 mm	1.3 mm	1.5 g	Nickel-plated steel	Milled	Orange blossom, name of country	Value, favoured tellin shells, pearls, year of issuance	2025	31 March 2025
		5c	16.75 mm	1.6 mm	2.42 g	Nickel-plated steel	Smooth with scallops	Orange blossom, name of country	Value, favoured tellin shells, pearls, year of issuance	2025	31 March 2025
		10c	18.25 mm	1.6 mm	2.9 g	Nickel-plated steel	Intermittent smooth and milled	Orange blossom, name of country	Value, favoured tellin shells, pearls, year of issuance	2025	31 March 2025
		25c	20 mm	1.6 mm	3.65 g	Nickel-plated steel	Smooth with seven indents	Orange blossom, name of country	Value, favoured tellin shells, pearls, year of issuance	2025	31 March 2025
		50c	22.25 mm	1.8 mm	4.45 g	Nickel-plated steel	Smooth, 11-sided	Orange blossom, name of country	Value, favoured tellin shells, pearls, year of issuance	2025	31 March 2025
		1Cg	28 mm	1.7 mm	7.2 g	Bi-metallic, nickel-plated steel ring and bronze-plated steel centre	Smooth, God zij met ons	King Willem-Alexander	Outline of Curaçao or coat of arms of Sint Maarten, name of country, value, year, green sea turtles	2025	31 March 2025
		5Cg	25.85 mm	?	8.6 g	Tri-metallic, nickel-plated steel outer ring, brass middle ring and nickel-plated steel centre	Smooth, God zij met ons	King Willem-Alexander	Outline of Curaçao or coat of arms of Sint Maarten, name of country, value, year, green sea turtles	2025	31 March 2025
These images are to scale at 2.5 pixels per millimetre. For table standards, see the coin specification table.

=== Banknotes ===
In June 2024, it was reported that all banknote designs had been approved and the first banknotes had been printed. The obverse of the banknotes feature marine life while the reverse features landmarks from the two island countries.

Banknotes of the Caribbean guilder (2025 issue)
Image		Value	Dimensions	Main colour	Description		Date of	
Obverse	Reverse	Value	Dimensions	Main colour	Obverse	Reverse	printing	issue
		10Cg	147 × 66 mm	Yellow	Gray angelfish, queen conch	Lighthouse on Klein Curaçao	31 March 2025	
		20Cg	147 × 66 mm	Blue	Spotted eagle ray, yellow cowry	Simpson Bay Lagoon	31 March 2025	
		50Cg	147 × 66 mm	Green	Green sea turtle, favoured tellin	Grote Knip beach	31 March 2025	
		100Cg	147 × 66 mm	Red	Stoplight parrotfish, music volute	Courthouse of Sint Maarten	31 March 2025	
		200Cg	147 × 66 mm	Purple	Longsnout seahorse, giant tun shell	Queen Emma Bridge	31 March 2025	
These images are to scale at 0.7 pixel per millimetre (18 pixel per inch). For table standards, see the banknote specification table.
