= Nasdaq Canada =

Nasdaq Canada is a wholly owned subsidiary of the Nasdaq Stock Market Inc. and was created to extend Nasdaq's North American trading platform in Canada. Nasdaq Canada exists to enhance and ensure Canadian investors immediate trading access (including real time availability of all relevant data) of all Nasdaq securities and issuers with the ability to raise capital more efficiently. Nasdaq Canada is regulated jointly by the NASDR and the Québec Securities Commission (CVMQ).

== History ==
Nasdaq Canada commenced functioning with the inaugural opening of its office from Montreal, Quebec, Canada, on 21 November 2000. In the first phase of the development of Nasdaq Canada, trading operations were initially started with Nasdaq workstations and terminals installed at 10 participating Canadian securities firms in Montreal. The 10 initial Canadian brokerages participating in Nasdaq Canada are:

- BMO Nesbitt Burns,
- Canaccord Capital,
- Capital Casgrain & Company,
- CIBC WorldMarkets Corp.,
- Mouvement Desjardins,
- NBC International, Inc. (USA),
- Pictet Overseas,
- Scotia Capital Markets,
- TD Securities,
- Yorkton Capital (USA)

This enabled these firms to trade the 5,000 Nasdaq-listed companies directly through their local broker, including the 42 Canadian companies previously listed solely on Nasdaq U.S. In December 2000, there were 146 Canadian companies listed on Nasdaq.

Helen Kearns was the first President of Nasdaq Canada. In July 2004, Nasdaq announced the closing of Nasdaq Canada's only office in Montreal. Nasdaq Canada's operations are now run out of New York City.

== Index ==
The Nasdaq Canada Index was created at the same time as Nasdaq Canada, and represents seasoned listings on the Toronto Stock Exchange, with additional factors on market cap. The Nasdaq Canada Index was originally composed of 61 companies, and as of July 2022 has 330 companies. The ticker symbol of this index is NQCA.

== See also ==
- List of stock exchanges
- List of American stock exchanges
