= List of Canadian exchange-traded funds =

This is a list of notable Canadian exchange-traded funds, or ETFs. It is not an exhaustive list.

== AGFiQ ==
AGFiQ is a subsidiary of AGF Management Inc offering factor-based ETFs to manage volatility.

- TSX: QCD – AGFiQ Enhanced Core Canadian Equity ETF
- TSX: QUS – AGFiQ Enhanced Core US Equity ETF
- TSX: QIE – AGFiQ Enhanced Core International Equity ETF
- TSX: QEM – AGFiQ Enhanced Core Emerging Markets Equity ETF
- TSX: QIF – AGFiQ Enhanced Global Infrastructure ETF
- TSX: QEF – AGFiQ Enhanced Global ESG Factors ETF
- TSX: QGL – AGFiQ Global Equity Rotation ETF
- TSX: QMA – AGFiQ MultiAsset Allocation ETF
- TSX: QMY – AGFiQ MultiAsset Income Allocation ETF

== BlackRock Inc ==
In Canada, BlackRock Inc. is the largest ETF provider, offering ETFs under the RBC iShares brand name

- TSX: XIU – iShares S&P/TSX 60 Index ETF
- TSX: XIC – iShares S&P/TSX Capped Composite Index ETF
- TSX: XMD – iShares S&P/TSX MidCap Index ETF
- TSX: XCS – iShares S&P/TSX SmallCap Index ETF
- TSX: XEF – iShares Core MSCI EAFE IMI Index ETF
- TSX: XEG – iShares S&P/TSX Capped Energy Index ETF
- TSX: XIT – iShares S&P/TSX Capped Information Technology Index ETF
- TSX: XGD – iShares S&P/TSX Capped Gold Index ETF
- TSX: XFN – iShares S&P/TSX Capped Financials Index ETF
- TSX: XMA – iShares S&P/TSX Capped Materials Index ETF
- TSX: XRE – iShares S&P/TSX Capped REIT Index ETF
- TSX: XTR – iShares S&P/TSX Income Trust Index ETF
- TSX: XDV – iShares Dow Jones Canada Select Dividend Index ETF
- TSX: XCG – iShares Dow Jones Canada Select Growth Index ETF
- TSX: XCV – iShares Dow Jones Canada Select Value Index ETF
- TSX: XEN – iShares Jantzi Social Index ETF
- TSX: XSB – iShares Core Canadian Short Term Bond Index ETF
- TSX: XBB – iShares Core Canadian Universe Bond Index ETF
- TSX: XRB – iShares Canadian Real Return Bond Index ETF
- TSX: XCB – iShares Canadian Corporate Bond Index ETF
- TSX: XGB – iShares Canadian Government Bond Index ETF
- TSX: XLB – iShares Core Canadian Long Term Bond Index ETF
- TSX: XSP – iShares Core S&P 500 Index ETF (CAD-hedged)
- TSX: XUS – iShares Core S&P 500 Index ETF
- TSX: XSU – iShares Russell 2000 Index ETF (CAD-hedged)
- TSX: XIN – iShares MSCI EAFE Index ETF (CAD-hedged)
- TSX: XEM – iShares MSCI Emerging Markets Index ETF
- TSX: XWD – iShares MSCI World Index ETF
- TSX: XQQ – iShares Nasdaq 100 Index ETF
- TSX: XCHP – iShares Semiconductor Index ETF

== BMO Asset Management ==
BMO Asset Management offers the following ETFs available in Canada

- TSX: ZCN – BMO TSX Capped Composite ETF
- TSX: ZCLN – BMO Clean Energy Index ETF
- TSX: ZDJ – BMO Dow Jones Industrial Average Hedged to CAD Index ETF
- TSX: ZUE – BMO US Equity Hedged to CAD Index ETF
- TSX: ZDM – BMO International Equity Hedged to CAD Index ETF
- TSX: ZEM – BMO Emerging Markets Equity Index ETF
- TSX: ZCH – BMO China Equity Hedged to CAD Index ETF
- TSX: ZID – BMO India Equity Hedged to CAD Index ETF
- TSX: ZEB – BMO S&P/TSX Equal Weight Banks Index ETF
- TSX: ZEO – BMO S&P/TSX Equal Weight Oil & Gas Index ETF
- TSX: ZUT – BMO Equal Weight Utilities Index ETF
- TSX: ZRE – BMO Equal Weight REITs Index ETF
- TSX: ZQQ – BMO NASDAQ 100 Equity Hedged to CAD Index ETF
- TSX: ZUH – BMO Equal Weight U.S. Health Care Hedged to CAD Index ETF
- TSX: ZUB – BMO Equal Weight U.S. Banks Hedged to CAD Index ETF
- TSX: ZGI – BMO Global Infrastructure Index ETF
- TSX: ZMT – BMO S&P/TSX Equal Weight Global Base Metals Hedged to CAD Index ETF
- TSX: ZJG – BMO Junior Gold Index ETF
- TSX: ZJO – BMO Junior Oil Index ETF
- TSX: ZJN – BMO Junior Gas Index ETF
- TSX: ZAG – BMO Aggregate Bond Index ETF
- TSX: ZFS – BMO Short Federal Bond Index ETF
- TSX: ZFM – BMO Mid Federal Bond Index ETF
- TSX: ZFL – BMO Long Federal Bond Index ETF
- TSX: ZRR – BMO Real Return Bond Index ETF
- TSX: ZPS – BMO Short Provincial Bond Index ETF
- TSX: ZCS – BMO Short Corporate Bond Index ETF
- TSX: ZCM – BMO Mid Corporate Bond Index ETF
- TSX: ZLC – BMO Long Corporate Bond Index ETF
- TSX: ZHY – BMO High Yield US Corporate Bond Hedged to CAD Index ETF
- TSX: ZEF – BMO Emerging Markets Bond Hedged to CAD Index ETF
- TSX: ZDV – BMO Canadian Dividend ETF
- TSX: ZPR – BMO S&P/TSX Laddered Preferred Share Index ETF
- TSX: ZWC – BMO Canada High Dividend Covered Call
- TSX: ZWE – BMO Europe High Dividend Covered Call Hedged to CAD ETF
- TSX: ZGD – BMO S&P/TSX Equal Weight Global Gold Index ETF
- TSX: ZSP – BMO S&P 500 Index ETF
- TSX: ZDY – BMO US Dividend ETF

== Evolve ETFs ==
Evolve specializes in thematic, innovation-oriented ETFs.

- TSX: BANK – Evolve Canadian Banks and Lifecos Enhanced Yield Index Fund
- TSX: UTES – Evolve Canadian Utilities Enhanced Yield Index Fund
- TSX: OILY – Evolve Canadian Energy Enhanced Yield Index Fund
- TSX: BIGY – Evolve US Equity UltraYield ETF
- TSX: CANY – Evolve Canadian Equity UltraYield ETF
- TSX: SIXY – Evolve Big Six Canadian Banks UltraYield Index ETF
- TSX: INTY – Evolve International Equity UltraYield ETF
- TSX: EASY – Evolve All-in-One UltraYield ETF
- TSX: ETSX – Evolve S&P/TSX 60 Enhanced Yield Fund
- TSX: ESPX – Evolve S&P 500 Enhanced Yield Fund
- TSX: QQQY – Evolve NASDAQ Technology Enhanced Yield Index Fund
- TSX: LIFE – Evolve Global Healthcare Enhanced Yield Fund
- TSX: CALL – Evolve US Banks Enhanced Yield Fund
- TSX: EBNK – Evolve European Banks Enhanced Yield ETF
- TSX: BASE – Evolve Global Materials & Mining Enhanced Yield Index ETF
- TSX: LEAD – Evolve Future Leadership Fund
- TSX: BOND – Evolve Enhanced Yield Bond Fund
- TSX: AGG – Evolve Canadian Aggregate Bond Enhanced Yield Fund
- TSX: MIDB – Evolve Enhanced Yield Mid Term Bond Fund
- TSX: HISU.U – US High Interest Savings Account Fund
- TSX: MCAD – Premium Cash Management Fund
- TSX: MUSD.U – US Premium Cash Management Fund
- TSX: QQQT – Evolve NASDAQ Technology Index Fund
- TSX: TECH – Evolve FANGMA Index ETF
- TSX: CYBR – Evolve Cyber Security Index Fund
- TSX: HERO – Evolve E-Gaming Index ETF
- TSX: ARTI – Evolve Artificial Intelligence Fund
- TSX: EDGE – Evolve Innovation Index Fund
- TSX: CARS – Evolve Automobile Innovation Index Fund
- TSX: DATA – Evolve Cloud Computing Index Fund
- TSX: EARN – Evolve Active Global Fixed Income Fund
- TSX: DIVS – Evolve Active Canadian Preferred Share Fund
- TSX: EBIT – Evolve Bitcoin ETF
- TSX: ETHR – Evolve Ether ETF
- TSX: XRP – Evolve XRP ETF
- TSX: SOLA – Evolve Solana ETF
- TSX: ETC – Evolve Cryptocurrencies ETF
- TSX: LBIT – Evolve Levered Bitcoin ETF
- TSX: LETH – Evolve Levered Ether ETF
- Cboe CA: HISA – High Interest Savings Account Fund
- Cboe CA: FIXD – Evolve Active Core Fixed Income Fund

== Hamilton ETFs (Hamilton Capital Partners Inc.) ==
Hamilton ETFs is an ETF manager headquartered in Toronto, Ontario. Their mission is to help Canadian investors get more from their portfolio. With over $17 billion in AUM, Hamilton ETFs is Canada’s largest independent ETF provider.

Financials ETFs

- TSX: HFG – Hamilton Global Financial ETF
- TSX: HUM – Hamilton U.S. Mid/Small-Cap Financials ETF
- TSX: HCA – Hamilton Canadian Bank Mean Reversion Index ETF
- TSX: HBA – Hamilton Australian Bank Equal-Weight Index ETF

Modestly levered ETFs (25% leverage)

- TSX: HCAL – Hamilton Enhanced Canadian Bank ETF
- TSX: HFIN – Hamilton Enhanced Canadian Financials ETF
- TSX: HDIV – Hamilton Enhanced Multi-Sector Covered Call ETF
- TSX: HYLD – Hamilton Enhanced U.S. Covered Call ETF
- TSX: HUTS – Hamilton Enhanced Utilities ETF

YIELD MAXIMIZER™ (high income)

- TSX: HMAX – Hamilton Canadian Financials YIELD MAXIMIZER™ ETF
- TSX: AMAX – Hamilton Gold Producer YIELD MAXIMIZER™ ETF
- TSX: EMAX – Hamilton Energy YIELD MAXIMIZER™ ETF
- TSX: FMAX – Hamilton U.S. Financials YIELD MAXIMIZER™ ETF
- TSX: LMAX – Hamilton Gold Producer YIELD MAXIMIZER™ ETF
- TSX: SMAX – Hamilton U.S. Equity YIELD MAXIMIZER™ ETF
- TSX: QMAX – Hamilton Technology YIELD MAXIMIZER™ ETF
- TSX: HBND – Hamilton U.S. Bond YIELD MAXIMIZER™ ETF
- TSX: HBIL – Hamilton U.S. T-Bill YIELD MAXIMIZER™ ETF

HAMILTON CHAMPIONS™ (low cost, total return)

- TSX: CMVP – HAMILTON CHAMPIONS™ Canadian Dividend Index ETF
- TSX: SMVP – HAMILTON CHAMPIONS™ U.S. Dividend Index ETF
- TSX: QMVP – HAMILTON CHAMPIONS™ U.S. Technology Index ETF
- TSX: UMVP – HAMILTON CHAMPIONS™ Utilities Index ETF
- TSX: HEB – HAMILTON CHAMPIONS™ Canadian Bank Equal-Weight Index ETF
- TSX: HFN – HAMILTON CHAMPIONS™ Canadian Financials Index ETF

== Harvest ETFs ==
Harvest ETFs is an independent ETF manager based in Oakville, Ontario.

- TSX: HHL - Harvest Healthcare Leaders Income ETF
- TSX: HTA - Harvest Tech Achievers Growth & Income ETF
- TSX: HBF - Harvest Brand Leaders Plus Income ETF
- TSX: HUTL - Harvest Equal Weight Global Utilities Income ETF
- TSX: HGR - Harvest Global REIT Leaders Income ETF
- TSX: HPF - Harvest Energy Leaders Plus Income ETF
- TSX: HUBL - Harvest US Bank Leaders Income ETF
- TSX: HLIF - Harvest Canadian Equity Income Leaders ETF
- TSX: TRVI - Harvest Travel & Leisure Income ETF
- TSX: HRIF HRIF - Harvest Diversified Equity Income ETF
- TSX: HPYT - Harvest Premium Yield Treasury ETF
- TSX: HPYM - Harvest Premium Yield 7-10 Year Treasury ETF
- TSX: TBIL - Harvest Canadian T-Bill ETF
- TSX: HDIF - Harvest Diversified Monthly Income ETF
- TSX: HHLE - Harvest Healthcare Leaders Enhanced Income ETF
- TSX: HTAE - Harvest Tech Achievers Enhanced Income ETF
- TSX: HUTE - Harvest Equal Weight Global Utilities Enhanced Income ETF
- TSX: HBFE - Harvest Brand Leaders Enhanced Income ETF
- TSX: HLFE - Harvest Canadian Equity Enhanced Income Leaders ETF
- TSX: HGGG - Harvest Global Gold Giants Index ETF
- TSX: TRVL - Harvest Travel & Leisure Index ETF
- TSX: HBLK - Blockchain Technologies ETF
- TSX: HCLN - Harvest Clean Energy ETF

== Horizons ETFs Management ==
Horizons Betapro also offers a series of ETFs available in Canada:

- TSX: DLR – Horizons U.S. Dollar Currency ETF
- TSX: DLR.U – Horizons U.S. Dollar Currency ETF (USD)
- TSX: HXT – Horizons S&P/TSX 60 Index ETF
- TSX: HXS – Horizons S&P 500 Index ETF
- TSX: HXQ – Horizons NASDAQ-100 Index ETF
- TSX: HXU – Horizons BetaPro S&P/TSX 60 Bull Plus ETF
- TSX: HXD – Horizons BetaPro S&P/TSX 60 Bear Plus ETF
- TSX: HEU – Horizons BetaPro S&P/TSX Capped Energy Bull Plus ETF
- TSX: HED – Horizons BetaPro S&P/TSX Capped Energy Bear Plus ETF
- TSX: HFU – Horizons BetaPro S&P/TSX Capped Financials Bull Plus ETF
- TSX: HFD – Horizons BetaPro S&P/TSX Capped Financials Bear Plus ETF
- TSX: HMU – Horizons BetaPro S&P/TSX Global Mining Bull Plus ETF
- TSX: HMD – Horizons BetaPro S&P/TSX Global Mining Bear Plus ETF
- TSX: HOU – Horizons BetaPro NYMEX Crude Oil Bull Plus ETF
- TSX: HOD – Horizons BetaPro NYMEX Crude Oil Bear Plus ETF
- TSX: HNU – Horizons BetaPro NYMEX Natural Gas Bull Plus ETF
- TSX: HND – Horizons BetaPro NYMEX Natural Gas Bear Plus ETF
- TSX: HBU – Horizons BetaPro COMEX Gold Bull Plus ETF
- TSX: HBD – Horizons BetaPro COMEX Gold Bear Plus ETF
- TSX: HAU – Horizons BetaPro DJ-AIG Agricultural Grains Bull Plus ETF
- TSX: HAD – Horizons BetaPro DJ-AIG Agricultural Grains Bear Plus ETF
- TSX: HBB – Horizons CDN Select Universe Bond ETF

== First Asset ==
- TSX: FHB – First Asset European Bank ETF
- TSX: RWC – First Asset MSCI Canada Low Risk Weighted ETF
- TSX: RWE – First Asset MSCI Europe Low Risk Weighted ETF (CAD Hedged)
- TSX: RWE.B – First Asset MSCI Europe Low Risk Weighted ETF (Unhedged)
- TSX: RWU – First Asset MSCI USA Low Risk Weighted ETF (CAD Hedged)
- TSX: RWU.B – First Asset MSCI USA Low Risk Weighted ETF (Unhedged)
- TSX: RWW – First Asset MSCI World Low Risk Weighted ETF (CAD Hedged)
- TSX: RWW.B – First Asset MSCI World Low Risk Weighted ETF (Unhedged)
- TSX: DXM – First Asset Morningstar Canada Dividend Target 30 Index ETF
- TSX: WXM – First Asset Morningstar Canada Momentum Index ETF
- TSX: FXM – First Asset Morningstar Canada Value Index ETF
- TSX: QXM – First Asset Morningstar National Bank Québec Index ETF
- TSX: UXM – First Asset Morningstar US Dividend Target 50 Index ETF (CAD Hedged)
- TSX: UXM.B – First Asset Morningstar US Dividend Target 50 Index ETF (Unhedged)
- TSX: YXM – First Asset Morningstar US Momentum Index ETF (CAD Hedged)
- TSX: YXM.B – First Asset Morningstar US Momentum Index ETF (Unhedged)
- TSX: XXM – First Asset Morningstar US Value Index ETF (CAD Hedged)
- TSX: XXM.B – First Asset Morningstar US Value Index ETF (Unhedged)
- TSX: TXF – First Asset Tech Giants Covered Call ETF (CAD Hedged)
- TSX: BXF – First Asset DEX 1-5 Year Laddered Government Strip Bond Index ETF
- TSX: AXF – First Asset DEX All Canada Bond Barbell Index ETF
- TSX: KXF – First Asset DEX Corporate Bond Barbell Index ETF
- TSX: GXF – First Asset DEX Government Bond Barbell Index ETF
- TSX: PXF – First Asset DEX Provincial Bond Index ETF
- TSX: EXM – First Asset Morningstar Emerging Markets Composite Bond Index ETF

== Purpose Investments Inc. ==
Purpose Investments Inc. is a division of Purpose Financial, a technology-driven financial services company. Purpose Investments offers the following 51 ETFs listed on the Toronto Stock Exchange and NEO Exchange:

- TSX: PSA - Purpose High Interest Savings ETF
- TSX: MJJ - Purpose Marijuana Opportunities Fund
- TSX: PSU.U - Purpose US Cash ETF
- TSX: BND - Purpose Global Bond Fund
- TSX: FLOT - Purpose Floating Rate Income Fund— FX Hedged
- TSX: FLOT.B - Purpose Floating Rate Income Fund— Non-FX Hedged
- TSX: FLOT.U - Purpose Floating Rate Income Fund— USD
- TSX: IGB - Purpose Managed Duration Investment Grade Bond Fund
- TSX: PBD - Purpose Total Return Bond Fund
- TSX: PCF - Purpose Energy Credit Fund— FX Hedged
- Cboe: PCF.U - Purpose Energy Credit Fund — USD
- Cboe: RPS - Purpose Canadian Preferred Share Fund
- Cboe: RPU - Purpose US Preferred Share Fund— FX Hedged
- Cboe: RPU.B - Purpose US Preferred Share Fund— Non-FX Hedged
- Cboe: RPU.U - Purpose US Preferred Share Fund— USD
- TSX: SBND - Purpose Short Duration Tactical Bond Fund
- TSX: SYLD - Purpose Strategic Yield Fund— FX Hedged
- TSX: BNC - Purpose Canadian Financial Income Fund
- TSX: PDF - Purpose Core Dividend Fund
- TSX: PDIV - Purpose Enhanced Dividend Fund
- TSX: PFG - Purpose Global Financials Income Fund
- TSX: PID - Purpose International Dividend Fund
- TSX: PUD - Purpose US Dividend Fund — FX Hedged
- TSX: PUD.B - Purpose US Dividend Fund— Non-FX Hedged
- Cboe: RDE - Purpose Core Equity Income Fund
- Cboe: REM - Purpose Emerging Markets Dividend Fund
- TSX: PIN - Purpose Monthly Income Fund
- TSX: PINC - Purpose Multi-Asset Income Fund
- TSX: PRP - Purpose Conservative Income Fund
- Cboe: RTA - Purpose Tactical Asset Allocation Fund
- Cboe: BHAV - Purpose Behavioural Opportunities Fund
- TSX: PBI - Purpose Best Ideas Fund — FX Hedged
- TSX: PBI.B - Purpose Best Ideas Fund— Non-FX Hedged
- TSX: PINV - Purpose Global Innovators Fund
- TSX: KILO - Purpose Gold Bullion Fund — FX Hedged
- TSX: KILO.B - Purpose Gold Bullion Fund— Non-FX Hedged
- TSX: KILO.U - Purpose Gold Bullion Fund — USD
- TSX: PEU - Purpose Enhanced US Equity Fund— FX Hedged
- TSX: PEU.B - Purpose Enhanced US Equity Fund— Non-FX Hedged
- TSX: PHE - Purpose Tactical Hedged Equity Fund— FX Hedged
- TSX: PHE.B - Purpose Tactical Hedged Equity Fund— Non-FX Hedged
- TSX: PHR - Purpose Duration Hedged Real Estate Fund
- TSX: PHW - Purpose International Tactical Hedged Equity Fund
- TSX: PMM - Purpose Multi-Strategy Market Neutral Fund
- TSX: PRA - Purpose Diversified Real Asset Fund
- TSX: PYF - Purpose Premium Yield Fund— FX Hedged
- TSX: PYF.B - Purpose Premium Yield Fund— Non-FX Hedged
- TSX: PYF.U - Purpose Premium Yield Fund — USD
- TSX: SBT - Purpose Silver Bullion Fund— FX Hedged
- TSX: SBT.B - Purpose Silver Bullion Fund— Non-FX Hedged
- TSX: SBT.U - Purpose Silver Bullion Fund — USD
- TSX: BTCC - Purpose Bitcoin ETF — FX Hedged
- TSX: BTCC.B - Purpose Bitcoin ETF — Non-FX Hedged
- TSX: BTCC.U - Purpose Bitcoin ETF — USD

== Vanguard Investments Canada Inc. ==
Vanguard Investments Canada Inc. offers the following 21 ETFs listed on the TSX:

- TSX: VCE – Vanguard FTSE Canada Index ETF
- TSX: VCN – Vanguard FTSE Canada All Cap Index ETF
- TSX: VDY – Vanguard FTSE Canadian High Dividend Yield Index ETF
- TSX: VRE – Vanguard FTSE Canadian Capped REIT Index ETF
- TSX: VUN – Vanguard U.S. Total Market Index ETF
- TSX: VUS – Vanguard U.S. Total Market Index ETF (CAD-hedged)
- TSX: VFV – Vanguard S&P 500 Index
- TSX: VSP – Vanguard S&P 500 Index (CAD-hedged)
- TSX: VGG – Vanguard U.S. Dividend Appreciation Index ETF
- TSX: VGH – Vanguard U.S. Dividend Appreciation Index ETF (CAD-hedged)
- TSX: VXC – Vanguard FTSE All-World ex Canada Index ETF
- TSX: VDU – Vanguard FTSE Developed ex North America Index ETF
- TSX: VEF – Vanguard FTSE Developed ex North America Index ETF (CAD-hedged)
- TSX: VE – Vanguard FTSE Developed Europe Index ETF
- TSX: VA – Vanguard FTSE Asia Pacific Index ETF
- TSX: VEE – Vanguard FTSE Emerging Markets Index ETF
- TSX: VAB – Vanguard Canadian Aggregate Bond Index ETF
- TSX: VSB – Vanguard Canadian Short-Term Bond Index ETF
- TSX: VSC – Vanguard Canadian Short-Term Corporate Bond Index ETF
- TSX: VBU – Vanguard U.S. Aggregate Bond Index ETF (CAD-hedged)
- TSX: VBG – Vanguard Global ex-U.S. Aggregate Bond Index ETF (CAD-hedged)
- TSX: VMO – Vanguard Global Momentum Factor ETF (VMO)
- TSX: VVL – Vanguard Global Value Factor ETF (VVL)
- TSX: VBAL – Vanguard Balanced ETF Portfolio (VBAL)
- TSX: VCNS – Vanguard Conservative ETF Portfolio (VCNS)
- TSX: VGRO – Vanguard Growth ETF Portfolio (VGRO)
- TSX: VEQT – Vanguard All Equity ETF (VEQT)

== WisdomTree Canada ==
- TSX: CAGS – WisdomTree Yield Enhanced Canada Short-Term Aggregate Bond Index ETF.
- TSX: EHE – WisdomTree Europe Hedged Equity Index ETF.
- TSX: CAGG – WisdomTree Yield Enhanced Canada Aggregate Bond Index ETF.
- TSX: ONEQ – ONE Global Equity ETF.
- TSX: DRG.B – WisdomTree U.S. Quality Dividend Growth Index ETF.
- TSX: EHE.B – WisdomTree Europe Hedged Equity Index ETF.
- TSX: DRG – WisdomTree U.S. Quality Dividend Growth Index ETF.
- TSX: UMI – WisdomTree U.S. MidCap Dividend Index ETF.
- TSX: DQD – WisdomTree U.S. Quality Dividend Growth Variably Hedged Index ETF™.
- TSX: IQD.B – WisdomTree International Quality Dividend Growth Index ETF.
- TSX: IQD – WisdomTree International Quality Dividend Growth Index ETF.
- TSX: DQI – WisdomTree International Quality Dividend Growth Variably Hedged Index ETF™.
- TSX: HID – WisdomTree U.S. High Dividend Index ETF.
- TSX: HID.B – WisdomTree U.S. High Dividend Index ETF.
- TSX: DRGC – WisdomTree Canada Quality Dividend Growth Index ETF.
- TSX: EMV.B – WisdomTree Emerging Markets Dividend Index ETF.
- TSX: UMI.B – WisdomTree U.S. MidCap Dividend Index ETF.

== Invesco ==
- TSX: PLV - PowerShares Low Volatility Portfolio ETF - CAD, May 6, 2015
- TSX: PTB - PowerShares Tactical Bond ETF, Aug 24 2012
- TSX: PFL - PowerShares 1-3 Year Laddered Floating Rate Note Index ETF, Jul 21 2014
- TSX: PSB - PowerShares 1-5 Year Laddered Investment Grade Corporate Bond Index ETF, Jun 15 2011
- TSX: USB - PowerShares LadderRite U.S. 0-5 Year Corporate Bond Index ETF - CAD, Jul 21 2014
- TSX: USB.U - PowerShares LadderRite U.S. 0-5 Year Corporate Bond Index ETF - USD, Jul 21 2014
- TSX: PGL - PowerShares Ultra Liquid Long Term Government Bond Index ETF, Jun 15 2011
- TSX: BKL - PowerShares Senior Loan (CAD Hedged) Index ETF, Apr 16 2012
- TSX: PFH - PowerShares Fundamental High Yield Corporate Bond (CAD Hedged) Index ETF, Jun 21 2011
- TSX: PPS - PowerShares Canadian Preferred Share Index ETF, Jun 16 2011
- TSX: PDC - PowerShares Canadian Dividend Index ETF, Jun 16 2011
- TSX: PSY - PowerShares Global Shareholder Yield ETF - CAD, May 6, 2015
- TSX: PSY.U - PowerShares Global Shareholder Yield ETF - USD, May 6, 2015
- TSX: TLV - PowerShares S&P/TSX Composite Low Volatility Index ETF, Apr 24 2012
- TSX: ULV - PowerShares S&P 500 Low Volatility (CAD Hedged) Index ETF, Jan 24 2012
- TSX: ILV - PowerShares S&P International Developed Low Volatility Index ETF, Sep 08 2014
- TSX: ELV - PowerShares S&P Emerging Markets Low Volatility Index ETF, Sep 08 2014
- TSX: PXC - PowerShares FTSE RAFI Canadian Fundamental Index ETF, Jan 26 2012
- TSX: PZC - PowerShares FTSE RAFI Canadian Small-Mid Fundamental Index ETF, Apr 14 2015
- TSX: PXS - PowerShares FTSE RAFI U.S. Fundamental Index ETF - CAD, Apr 14 2015
- TSX: PXS.U - PowerShares FTSE RAFI U.S. Fundamental Index ETF - USD, Apr 14 2015
- TSX: PXU - PowerShares FTSE RAFI US Fundamental (CAD Hedged) Index ETF, Jan 26 2012
- TSX: PXG - PowerShares FTSE RAFI Global+ Fundamental Index ETF - CAD, Apr 14 2015
- TSX: PXG.U - PowerShares FTSE RAFI Global+ Fundamental Index ETF - USD, Apr 14 2015
- TSX: PZW - PowerShares FTSE RAFI Global Small-Mid Fundamental ETF - CAD, May 6, 2015
- TSX: PZW.U - PowerShares FTSE RAFI Global Small-Mid Fundamental ETF - USD, May 6, 2015
- TSX: QQC.F - PowerShares QQQ (CAD Hedged) Index ETF, Jun 16 2011

== First Trust ==
- TSX: FST - First Trust Canadian Capital Strength ETF
- TSX: FST.A - First Trust Canadian Capital Strength ETF
- TSX: FDE - First Trust AlphaDEX™ Emerging Market Dividend ETF (CAD-Hedged)
- TSX: FDE.A - First Trust AlphaDEX™ Emerging Market Dividend ETF (CAD-Hedged)
- TSX: EUR - First Trust AlphaDEX™ European Dividend Index ETF (CAD-Hedged)
- TSX: EUR.A - First Trust AlphaDEX™ European Dividend Index ETF (CAD-Hedged)
- TSX: FUD - First Trust AlphaDEX™ U.S. Dividend ETF (CAD-Hedged)
- TSX: FUD.A - First Trust AlphaDEX™ U.S. Dividend ETF (CAD-Hedged)
- TSX: FHD - First Trust AlphaDEX™ U.S. Consumer Discretionary Sector Index ETF
- TSX: FHC - First Trust AlphaDEX™ U.S. Consumer Staples Sector Index ETF
- TSX: FHE - First Trust AlphaDEX™ U.S. Energy Sector Index ETF
- TSX: FHF - First Trust AlphaDEX™ U.S. Financial Sector Index ETF
- TSX: FHH - First Trust AlphaDEX™ U.S. Health Care Sector Index ETF
- TSX: FHG - First Trust AlphaDEX™ U.S. Industrials Sector Index ETF
- TSX: FHM - First Trust AlphaDEX™ U.S. Materials Sector Index ETF
- TSX: FHQ - First Trust AlphaDEX™ U.S. Technology Sector Index ETF
- TSX: FHU - First Trust AlphaDEX™ U.S. Utilities Sector Index ETF
- TSX: FSL - First Trust Senior Loan ETF (CAD-Hedged)
- TSX: FSL.A - First Trust Senior Loan ETF (CAD-Hedged)
- TSX: FHY - First Trust Short Duration High Yield Bond ETF (CAD-Hedged)
- TSX: FHY.A - First Trust Short Duration High Yield Bond ETF (CAD-Hedged)
- TSX: ETP - First Trust Global Risk Managed Income Index ETF
- TSX: ETP.A - First Trust Global Risk Managed Income Index ETF
- TSX: FTB - First Trust Tactical Bond Index ETF
- TSX: FSR - First Trust Dorsey Wright U.S. Sector Rotation Index ETF (CAD-Hedged)

== See also ==
- List of exchange-traded funds
- List of American exchange-traded funds
