= Trade Union Centre of Curaçao =

Trade union

SSK
- Trade Union Centre of Curaçao
- Sentral di Sindikatonan di Korsou
- Headquarters: Willemstad
- Location: Curaçao
- Affiliations: ITUC

The Trade Union Centre of Curaçao (SSK) is a trade union federation on the island Curaçao in the Dutch Caribbean. It is affiliated with the International Trade Union Confederation. The SSK building at 44 Schouwburgweg in Willemstad is home to several of the associated unions.

== Members ==
- Sitek Sindikato di Trahadó den Edukashon na Kòrsou (Education workers union)
- Sebi Sindikato di Empleadonan di Bibienda (Trade Union of Domestic Workers)
- CBV Curaçaose Bond van Werknemers in Verzorgende Beroepen (Healthcare workers union)
- STK Sindikato di Trahadonan di Kòrsou (Curaçao Workers Union)
- STKO Sindikato di Trahadonan di KODELA (Workers Union of the Water- and Electricity Distribution Company, formerly KODELA, since 2001 Aqualectra)
- PWFC (Petroleum Workers Federation of Curaçao)
- CFW Curaçaose Federatie van Werknemers (Curaçao Employees Federation)
- UGTK-Cadmu Algemene Dok- en Metaalwerkers Unie (General Union of Dock- and Metalworkers)
- Aric
- SGTK Sindikato General Trahadó Kòrsou (General Union of Workers of Curaçao)
