= Cboe Canada =

Canadian Stock Exchange

- Formerly: Neo Exchange Inc.
- Type: Stock Exchange
- Location: Toronto, Canada
- Founded: 2015
- Owner: Cboe Global Markets
- Currency: CAD
- No. of listings: 241 (August 2022)
- Website: www.cboe.ca

Cboe Canada (formerly NEO Exchange) is a stock exchange based in Toronto. Part of the Cboe Global Markets network, the exchange has over 260 listings for public companies, exchange-traded funds (ETFs), Canadian Depositary Receipts (CDRs), Special Purpose Acquisition Companies (SPACs), and closed-end funds. Cboe Canada handles 15% of the volume traded across Canadian marketplaces, including 20% of Canadian ETF transactions.

== History ==
NEO Exchange received a recognition order from the Ontario Securities Commission on November 17, 2014 and commenced trading of 45 Toronto Stock Exchange-listed securities on March 27, 2015. On the first day, about 6.1 million securities worth approximately $106.3 million were traded on the exchange.

In January 2016, NEO secured its first listing: the Invesco PowerShares DWA Global Momentum Index ETF, which began trading on March 31, 2016. In September 2016, BlackRock Asset Management Canada Ltd. announced their intention to change the listing venue of five iShares exchange-traded funds, consisting of 12 listings in total, from the Toronto Stock Exchange to NEO. The transition of all 12 listings was completed on February 22, 2017.

In early 2017, Redwood Asset Management and BMO Asset Management separately announced plans to list exchange-traded funds on NEO for the first time, while Invesco Canada applied to list two additional PowerShares listings on NEO. On April 20, 2017, Mackenzie Financial announced the imminent launch of a new Global High Yield Fixed Income ETF, becoming the fifth issuer to list on the NEO Exchange.

Cannabis Strategies Acquisition Corp. (NEO:CSA.A), a special purpose acquisition corporation backed by Canaccord Genuity Corp., completed its initial public offering of US$125,000,000 and began trading its shares on December 21, 2017, becoming the first corporate issuer to list on the NEO Exchange.

RBC Global Asset Management Inc. (RBC GAM) launched seven new ETFs that began trading on the NEO on Thursday, September 21, 2017. It was the first time RBC GAM listed ETFs on NEO and the firm became the sixth provider to list on the exchange in 2017.

Purpose Investments Inc. changed the listing venue for certain closed-end funds (CEFs) and unit-traded funds (UTFs) from the Toronto Stock Exchange (TSX) to NEO Exchange on December 29, 2017. These investment funds will be the first of their kinds to list on NEO, and include the first products to launch on NEO under the Purpose brand.

The NEO Exchange welcomed Nobilis Health (NEO:HLTH), the first company to complete a cross-listing on NEO and the New York Stock Exchange (NYSE), on March 7, 2017. Nobilis Health was previously listed on the TSX and chose to return to Canada because of NEO's focus on "liquidity, their investor communication services and the streamlined disclosure-based listing model, coupled with their unwavering dedication to meeting the needs of public companies and investors".

The NEO Exchange welcomed three ETF providers in the first quarter of 2018, beginning in February when AGF Investment Inc. launched two new ETFs on NEO and Horizons ETFs Management (Canada) Inc. announced the launch of the Horizons Emerging Marijuana Growers Index ETF (NEO:HMJR). On March 29, Evolve Funds Group Inc. launched Evolve Active Core Fixed Income ETF on NEO.

By April 2018, NEO accounted for close to 10% of all Canadian equity trading (over 6%, excluding block trades), close to 20% of all Canadian ETF trading (over 10%, excluding block trades), and over 60 NEO-listed ETFs and closed-end fund symbols from 9 different issuers.

On October 2, 2018, Starlight Capital became the tenth ETF provider to list funds on NEO, when they launched their first ETFs: the Starlight Global Real Estate Fund (ticker symbol SCGR) and the Starlight Global Infrastructure Fund (SCGI).

== Consolidated market data ==
Cboe Canada has consistently advocated for enhanced access to consolidated market data for Canadian investors, claiming retail investors and the majority of investment advisors have access only to a partial view of market as less than 35% of ETF trading activity and less than 60% of overall trading activity in TSX and TSXV-listed securities is reflected in TSX and TSXV data.

In December 2015, Cboe Canada, then the NEO Exchange, filed a complaint with the Competition Bureau alleging the TMX Group was “using its dominant market position to maintain control over the pricing of market data in the Canadian capital markets.” On November 21, 2016 the Competition Bureau concluded their investigation after determining the TMX Group's refusal to share the requested market data was likely not a violation of competition rules.

In response to the Competition Bureau's decision to close their investigation, the NEO Exchange called on the Canadian Securities Administrators to “mandate access to consolidated market data for all investors, including retail investors and their investment advisors.”

== NEO Connect ==
NEO Connect is a fund distribution platform offered by Cboe Canada, allowing investment products not listed on an exchange be purchased and redeemed by investors, working through an IIROC dealer, in a similar fashion to publicly traded securities and exchange traded funds. The platform streamlines the purchase and redemption process for prospectus mutual funds and offering memorandum funds, making it easier and more cost-effective for investors and advisors to access investment products.

Invesco Canada became the first fund manufacturer to launch PTFs with NEO in 2015. In April 2018, NEO Connect and software maker Univeris Corp. announced a partnership that will provide investors working through an MFDA dealer with direct access to NEO Connect investment products. Vancouver-based First Block Capital's FBC Bitcoin Trust became available on the fund distribution platform in September 2018.

== See also ==
- List of stock exchanges in the Americas
