= Bermuda Stock Exchange =

National bourse of Bermuda

- BSX
- Type: Stock exchange
- Location: Hamilton, Bermuda
- Coordinates: 32.293°N 64.782°W
- Founded: 1971; 55 years ago
- Owner: MIAX
- Key people: David Brown (Chairman); Greg Wojciechowski (President & CEO); James McKirdy (Chief Compliance Officer)
- Currency: Bermudian dollar
- Website: www.bsx.com

The Bermuda Stock Exchange (BSX), established in 1971, is located in Hamilton, Bermuda.

In 2019, a controlling interest in the BSX was acquired by Miami International Holdings, Inc.

The stock exchange's 2010 'Year End Review' report stated that its aggregate market capitalisation (excluding mutual funds) stood at US$319 billion.

The exchange specialises in listing and trading of capital market instruments such as stocks, bonds, mutual fund (including hedge fund structures) and depository receipt programs.

The BSX has been granted approved stock exchange status under Australia's Foreign Investment Fund taxation rules, and, effective 1 September 2005 was granted designated investment exchange status by the United Kingdom's Financial Services Authority. The unique four symbol alphanumeric Market Identifier Code (MIC) used to identify the BSX as defined under ISO 10383. of the International Organization for Standardization (ISO) is: XBDA.

== History ==
In 2019, Miami International Holdings acquired a majority stake in BSX.

== Securities ==
The securities listed on the BSX are:

Asset class	Number of securities	Percentage of total listings
Collective investment vehicles	322	39.9%
Derivative warrants	399	49.4%
Domestic main board companies	11	1.4%
Domestic small capitalisation companies	4	0.5%
Fixed income	10	1.2%
International company or secondary listing	34	4.2%
Insurance linked security or programme	17	2.1%
International company and mezzanine	11	1.4%
Totals	808	100%

== See also ==
- List of stock exchanges in the Americas
- List of stock exchanges in the United Kingdom, the British Crown Dependencies and United Kingdom Overseas Territories
- Americas Central Securities Depositories Association
