= Long-Term Stock Exchange =

SEC-registered national securities exchange

- Type: Stock exchange
- Location: New York City and San Francisco, United States
- Founded: 2012
- Owner: LTSE Group. LTSE (the exchange) is a subsidiary of LTSE Group.
- Key people: Eric Ries Founder; Maliz Beams CEO and Chair, LTSE group (from 2020); Bill Harts CEO Long-Term Stock Exchange (from 2024)
- Currency: United States dollar (US$)
- Website: ltse.com

The Long-Term Stock Exchange (LTSE) is a U.S.-based national securities exchange headquartered in New York City. It was created with the intent to create long-term corporate governance and investment practices. Companies listing on LTSE are required to adopt governance standards that emphasize long-term business performance and stakeholder commitments. The exchange has received financial backing from venture capital firms such as Andreessen Horowitz, Founders Fund, and Greylock Partners, as well as individual investors. The exchange is a subsidiary of LTSE Group.

== History ==
The idea of the LTSE was first outlined by entrepreneur Eric Ries in his 2011 book The Lean Startup. Ries later developed the concept into a concrete project, assembling a team that eventually included about 20 staff and advisors. The company received early funding of approximately $19 million from around 70 investors, including Andreessen Horowitz, Founders Fund, Greylock Partners, SV Angel, and individual backers such as Reid Hoffman, Dick Costolo, Steve Case, Andrew Mason, Marc Andreessen, Tim O’Reilly, and Aneesh Chopra. Amy Butte, former CFO of the New York Stock Exchange, served as an advisor. The project also involved former staff from the NYSE and the U.S. Treasury.Vox reported that early observers described the idea as a "loony never-gonna-happen proposal."

Before becoming an independent exchange, LTSE partnered with IEX Group to propose new listing standards in 2018, while still preparing its own application to the Securities and Exchange Commission (SEC). In May 2019, the SEC approved LTSE’s application to operate as a national securities exchange, making it the 14th such exchange in the United States. This approval followed earlier resistance from the regulator and required revisions to LTSE’s proposals.

LTSE officially launched trading in September 2020 after delays caused by the COVID-19 pandemic. At the time, the exchange had 39 employees. On its first day, trading volume reached 283,765 shares, with a notional value of $117.7 million, although some clients experienced temporary order delays.

The exchange secured its first company listings in 2021, when Twilio and Asana began dual-listing their shares on LTSE alongside their primary listings on the New York Stock Exchange, followed by ThredUp in 2023. LTSE’s early listing strategy focused on dual listings to build confidence in its model before pursuing primary listings.

In June 2022, LTSE raised $100 million in funding from James Walton, grandson of Walmart founder Sam Walton, in partnership with The Space Between (TSB), a venture fund that included former LTSE chief operating officer Holly Grant and board adviser Xue Devand. Previous financing rounds had also included Andreessen Horowitz, Founders Fund, and Collaborative Fund.

== Rules and Positioning ==
LTSE requires listed companies to adopt governance standards linking executive and board compensation to long-term business performance and stakeholder commitments. Companies must publicly disclose which stakeholders they consider critical, their environmental impact, and how governance aligns with their long-term vision. Failure to comply with these standards can result in delisting.

The exchange has promoted a system of tenure-based voting rights, in which shareholders gain increased voting power the longer they hold their shares, capped at ten times the ordinary voting power after ten years. This proposal has been controversial, with critics arguing it could entrench founder control, while proponents present it as an alternative to multiple-class share structures.

LTSE rules restrict the use of executive bonuses tied to short-term performance and prohibit companies from issuing quarterly earnings guidance, although quarterly results remain required under U.S. securities law.

In 2025, LTSE filed a petition with the SEC to allow all U.S. public companies, not only those listed on its exchange, the option to report earnings on a semiannual rather than quarterly basis. LTSE CEO Bill Harts argued that quarterly reporting is overly burdensome and detracts from long-term management. The exchange’s representatives met with SEC officials in advance of filing the petition.

LTSE positions itself as an alternative to the dominant U.S. exchanges by emphasizing long-term sustainability, environmental, social and governance (ESG) commitments, and corporate accountability. It also operates LTSE Equity, a software platform for hiring planning and cap table management, LTSE states about one-fifth of venture-backed companies from seed to Series C funding rounds.
