= Hudson River Trading =

Quantitative trading firm based in NYC

Hudson River Trading LLC
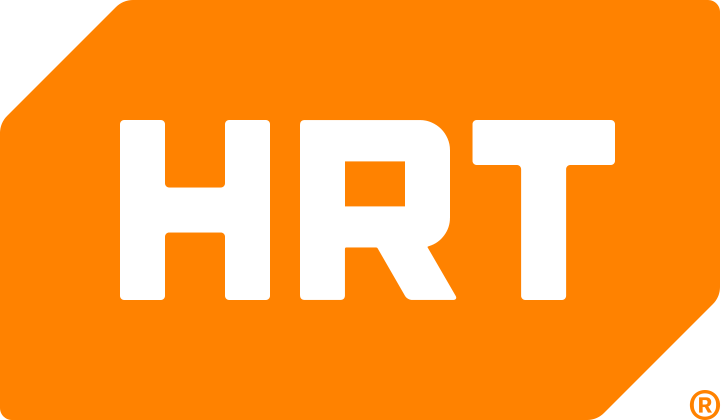
- Type: Private
- Industry: Financial services
- Headquarters: New York City, New York, USA
- Products: Algorithmic trading
- Owner: Jason Carroll, Prashant Lal
- Website: hudsonrivertrading.com

Hudson River Trading LLC is an American electronic market making company headquartered in New York City, New York, United States. It was founded in 2002. As of 2021, it accounted for more than 15% of all daily equities trading in the United States. Hudson River Trading employs over 1,000 people in 14 offices around the world, including New York, Chicago, Austin, Boulder, London, Singapore, Shanghai, Mumbai, and Dublin. The firm focuses on research and development of automated trading algorithms using mathematical techniques, and trades on over 200 markets worldwide.

The company is a member of the Principal Traders Group, an advisory group formed by the Futures Industry Association (FIA).

== Business ==
=== Trading ===
Hudson River Trading is a multi-asset class firm that trades across various time horizons. It differs from other market makers and high-frequency trading firms in several ways: it holds about 25% of its trading capital overnight (unlike most high-frequency trading firms that hold almost nothing overnight), it operates mid-frequency trading strategies, holding some positions for days and weeks in addition to the sub-second times observed across some high-frequency trading firms, and it does less than 1% of its trading in dark pools, the lightly regulated private trading venues under scrutiny from regulators.

=== Development ===
In January 2014, Hudson River Trading and three other quantitative trading firms formed the Modern Markets Initiative, a trade lobbying group. In August 2014, Bart Chilton was added as an advisor to the group.

On January 16, 2018, Hudson River Trading acquired its rival firm Sun Trading, a global market maker that traded on over 115 exchanges.

In the first quarter of 2021, Bloomberg reported that Hudson River Trading reaped about $1.2 billion from trading, amid heightened market volatility.

In 2025, the firm generated net trading revenue of $12.3 billion.

=== Employees ===
The firm hires programmers, software engineers, and mathematicians to develop and improve its trading strategies. Its head of business development, Adam Nunes, has been cited in a Wall Street Journal article on financial firms' efforts to recruit programming talent away from Silicon Valley and his reasons for optimism about their ability to do so.

Hudson River Trading has also adapted to hiring AI-focused experts, including targeting academics and talent from AI research labs. The firm spent $1 billion per year on artificial intelligence as of 2025 and 2026.

=== Government regulation ===
In March 2014, New York Attorney General Eric Schneiderman announced a probe into high-frequency traders, including Hudson River Trading, getting early access to raw stock market feeds at an annual price of $180,000. Hudson River Trading's head of business development, Adam Nunes, defended the company's business practices in statements made to Newsweek, noting that Wall Street traders also had access to the feeds at the same price and many of them already made use of them.

In July 2014, the Securities and Exchange Commission (SEC) in the United States launched a probe into ten top high-frequency trading firms, including Hudson River Trading.

== See also ==
- Citadel Securities
- Virtu Financial
- Jane Street Capital
- Two Sigma Investments
- PDT Partners
