= Bursa (Romanian newspaper) =

Romanian newspaper

Bursa (lit. 'The Stock Exchange') is a Romanian language business newspaper published in Bucharest, Romania. The paper was started in 1990. It is part of Multimedia Inc and is published by Press Group from Monday to Friday. The paper offers articles about the financial and capital markets in Romania.

== Controversies ==
The company that owned the newspaper S.C. Meta Ring S.R.L. has sued the journalist and the blogger, Simona Tache, for the author copyrights infringement, when she published an article where she has joshed the habit related to publishing of a calendar with the company's female employees in feminine and even erotic states, presenting the pictures taken from those calendars. The journalist claims of having the right to use, without the author's consent, the passages of the work to exemplify the opinion she expresses freely. The company demanded to remove the photos used as an example and to pay the damages amounting to 50 Lei per day, but the first instance rejected the applicant's claim. In September 2016 the process was in the appeal phase.
