= Eastern Caribbean Securities Exchange =

Regional stock exchange

The Eastern Caribbean Securities Exchange (ECSE) is the first regional securities market in the Western Hemisphere and a regional stock exchange, established by the Eastern Caribbean Central Bank (ECCB) to serve the eight member territories of Anguilla, Antigua and Barbuda, Dominica, Grenada, Montserrat, Saint Kitts and Nevis, Saint Lucia, and Saint Vincent and the Grenadines. Its headquarters are located in the city of Basseterre, on the island of St. Kitts.

== History ==
Launched in 2001 as a fully electronic regional exchange.

== Operations ==
Trades are settled on a one day after trade (T+1) cycle and cleared on a delivery against payment (DVP) basis.

Equities are listed

Sovereign Debt is listed for:

- Government of Antigua & Barbuda
- Government of the Commonwealth of Dominica
- Government of Grenada
- Government of St. Kitts & Nevis
- Government of St. Lucia
- Government of St. Vincent and the Grenadines

== See also ==
- Eastern Caribbean Central Securities Registry
- List of stock exchanges in the Commonwealth of Nations
- List of stock exchanges in the United Kingdom, the British Crown Dependencies and United Kingdom Overseas Territories
- Dutch Caribbean Securities Exchange
