= Claude Ménard (economist) =

Canadian economist

Claude Ménard (French: [menaʁ]; born 1944) is a Canadian economist and professor at the University of Paris I: Panthéon-Sorbonne. Ménard is also the creator and former director of the Centre d'analyse théorique des organisations et des marchés (ATOM), which merged with the Centre d'Economie de la Sorbonne in 2009, as well as a co-founder of the Society for Institutional & Organizational Economics (formally the International Society for New Institutional Economics). His research focuses on institutional and organizational economics.

== Youth and education ==
Claude Ménard was born in Valleyfield, Quebec, and grew up in Canada. He studied at the University of Montréal, where he obtained a B.A. in 1963, a M.A. in 1966, and a doctoral program diploma in the history of sciences in 1970. Thereafter, he moved to France, where he pursued his studies at the University of Paris I: Panthéon-Sorbonne and obtained Ph.D.s in both the history of sciences and economics with the distinction "magna cum laude" in 1974 and 1981, respectively.

== Academic career ==
Following the completion of his postgraduate studies in Montréal, Claude Ménard worked from 1966 to 1974 as professor of economic history at the Collège Edouard Montpetit in Montréal, while in parallel doing research at the Canadian Museum of History (former "Museum of Man") in Gatineau, Quebec. He then moved to Europe in 1974 when he accepted a research position at the University of Utrecht, which he quit in 1978 to become associate professor of economics at the University of Paris I: Panthéon-Sorbonne. He then left Panthéon-Sorbonne after obtaining his Ph.D. in economics to become a full professor of economics at the University of Dijon in 1981, but returned to Panthéon-Sorbonne as a professor of economics in 1983, a position he still holds to this day. Moreover, Ménard has been an international associate of the Institute of Water Policy of the National University of Singapore since 2009 and a senior research fellow at the TU Delft since

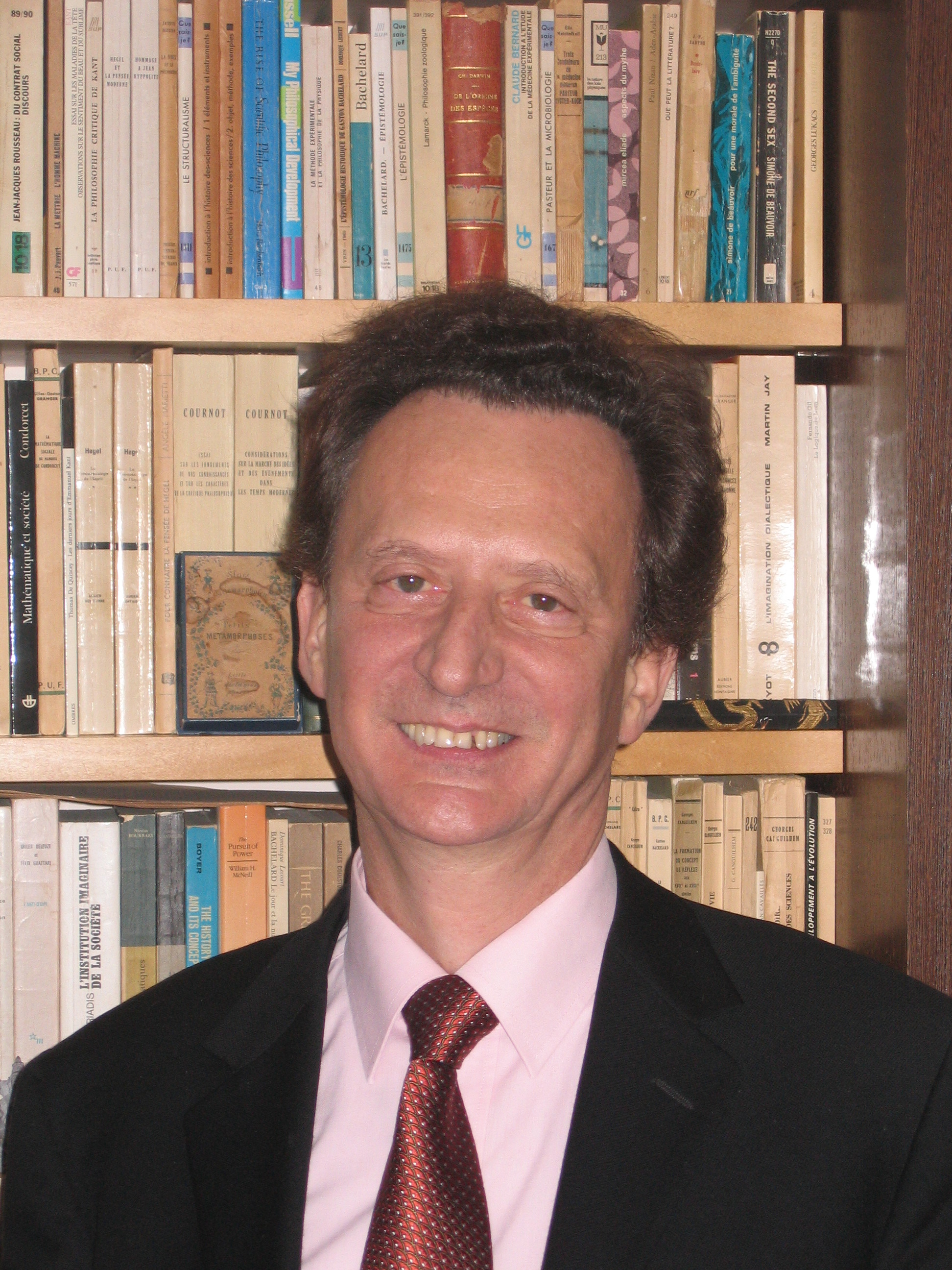
Ménard in 2009

In 1991 Ménard founded the Centre d'analyse théorique des organisations et des marchés (ATOM) at the Sorbonne and directed it until its merger with the Centre d'Économie de la Sorbonne in 2009. In the past he has also worked as senior researcher at the CNRS (1998-2000) and has held numerous visiting positions at universities around the world, e.g. the University of California, Berkeley (1991-1992), the National University of Colombia (1996), Erasmus University Rotterdam (2002) or the Massachusetts Institute of Technology (2004).

== Personal life ==
Claude Ménard has two daughters and is passionate about cross-country skiing and canoeing.

== Bibliography ==
- Claude Ménard: La Formation d'une rationalité économique. Paris: Flammarion, 1978.
- Claude Ménard: L'économie des organisations. Paris: La Découverte, 1990.
  - Claude Ménard: L'économie des organisations. Paris: La Découverte, 2004 (2nd ed.).
  - Claude Ménard: L'économie des organisations. Paris: La Découverte, 2012 (3rd ed.).
- Claude Ménard (ed.): Transaction Cost Economics: Recent Developments. Cheltenham: Edward Elgar Publishing Co., 1997.
- Claude Ménard (ed.): Institutions, Contracts and Organizations. Perspectives from New Institutional Economics. Cheltenham: Edward Elgar Publishing Co., 2000.
- V.E. Brusilovsky, L.E. Grigoriev, A.E. Shastitko: Problems of Price and Tarif Regulation of Natural Monopoly Services: The Case of Federal Airports. Moscow: Bureau of Economic Analysis, 2001.
- M. Ghertman, Claude Ménard: Regulation, Deregulation, Reregulation. Cheltenham: Edward Elgar Publishing Co., 2009.
- Bernard Abeillé, Christine Leon de Mariz, Claude Ménard: Public Procurement Reforms in Africa. Challenges in Institutions and Governance. Oxford (UK): Oxford University Press, 2014.
- Claude Ménard: The Economics of Organization. Cambridge (UK): Cambridge University Press, forthcoming.
