= Dutch Caribbean Securities Exchange =

- Type: Local & International Securities Exchange
- Location: Willemstad, Curaçao, Kingdom of the Netherlands
- Founded: 2009
- Website: dcsx.cw

The Dutch Caribbean Securities Exchange (DCSX) is a self-regulatory international Exchange for the listing and trading in domestic and international securities. It is a platform where companies can register for funding, and investors can choose companies in which to invest. The DCSX is focused on servicing startups and small and medium-sized enterprises.

== Structure ==
The DCSX Foundation functions as the self-regulatory direct supervisory body that assures that the Management of the DCSX adheres to the processes as laid down in the Rules and Regulations. It is also the DSCX Foundation that needs to approve new members to the DCSX. The Board of the DCSX Foundation is composed of representatives of financial institutions and or other organizations whose interest it is that Curaçao has a well-functioning securities exchange.

The Board of Directors of the Exchange consists of the CEO, the President of the Board, the Treasurer of the Board and a few Board Members. A Listing Committee is responsible for approving new listings on the Exchange. Arbitration is managed by an Appeals Committee.

== Rules and regulations ==
The DCSX has a set of well-defined rules to regulate and supervise the market and its participants. The rules provide smaller companies with flexibility and easier access to an equity market while providing transparency and strong governance. The DCSX is a regulated membership organization, licensed by the Minister of Finance and supervised by the Central Bank of Curaçao and Sint Maarten. The DCSX follows Curaçao law, which is in concordance with Dutch Law. Final appeals of dispute are heard and decided at the Supreme Court of the Netherlands.

== Supervision ==
The DCSX operates under full license of the Minister of Finance of the Curacao Government and is supervised by the Central Bank of Curacao and Sint Maarten. The supervision of the Central Bank comprises, among other things, ensuring transparency and business integrity, the proper administrative organization and internal control environment, and the adequate functioning of the securities market and exchange.

== Custodian ==
The DCSX custodial bank is Vidanova Bank N.V. Vidanova Bank N.V.’s majority shareholder (with an equity ownership of > 80 %) is the Vidanova Pension Fund in Curacao.

== Participating companies ==
=== DCSX members ===
- Algemeen Pensioen Fonds (APC)
- Amicorp Global Markets (Curacao) N.V.
- Banco di Caribe N.V.
- Guardian Group N.V.
- Maduro & Curiel's Bank N.V.
- PSB Bank N.V.
- Vidanova Bank N.V.

=== DCSX Listing Advisors ===
- Amicorp Global Markets (Curacao) N.V.
- Eclipse Management B.V.
- First Bonaire Capital B.V.
- HBN Law Listing Advisory Services B.V.
- IQEQ Management (Curaçao) N.V.
- Lismart Consultants Ltd
- Management Services Investra B.V.
- PYGG Corporate Finance B.V.
- Qingdao IDC Financial Advisory Co Ltd
- Sino Tech B.V.
- Suzhou Huayixin Financial Consulting Co Ltd
- TIF Effecten Ltd
- Untitled LAD Services LLC
- VanEps
- ZFAST Consulting Ltd

=== DCSX Brokers ===
- Amicorp Global Markets (Curacao) N.V.
- Banco di Caribe N.V.
- Maduro & Curiel's Bank N.V.
- PYGG Securities Co B.V.
- Vidanova Bank N.V.

== Affiliations ==
- In Q1 2021 the D.C.S.E. became a member of the Capital Markets Association of the Americas or (Spanish: Asociación de Mercados de Capitales de las Américas) (AMERCA). The bloc formed by the Stock Exchanges of: Costa Rica, Ecuador, El Salvador, Guatemala, Honduras, Nicaragua, Panamá and the Dominican Republic which unanimously accepted the application by the D.C.S.E.
- The DCSX is a correspondent member of the World Federation of Exchanges.

== See also ==
- Central banks and currencies of the Caribbean
- Eastern Caribbean Securities Exchange
- Euronext
