= List of financial market information services =

This is a list of financial market information services, including media organizations, publications, and software platforms that provide investors and market participants with information about financial markets, market data, securities, economic activity, and investment analysis.

== Financial news media ==
- Bloomberg News
- CNBC
- CNN Business
- Financial Times
- Fox Business
- Investor's Business Daily
- MarketWatch
- Reuters
- The Economic Times
- TheStreet
- The Wall Street Journal
- Yahoo! Finance

== Market data and financial analytics providers ==
- Bloomberg Terminal
- Broadridge Financial Solutions
- Cbonds
- Compustat
- Dealogic
- Dun & Bradstreet
- FactSet
- Fidessa
- Hithink RoyalFlush Information Network
- ICE Data Services
- Interactive Data Corporation
- ION Group
- Moody's Analytics
- Morningstar
- MSCI
- Preqin
- Refinitiv
- S&P Global
- SIX Financial Information
- Wind Information
- Zero2IPO

== Retail investor research and analysis platforms ==
- Barron's
- Investing.com
- Seeking Alpha
- StockTwits
- The Motley Fool
- TipRanks
- TradingView
- Webull

== Technical analysis software ==
- CQG
- eSignal
- MetaStock
- MetaTrader 4
- MultiCharts
- ProRealTime
- ShareScope
- TradeStation
- Wealth Lab

== See also ==
- Business journalism
- Financial data vendor
- List of business journals
- List of books about investing
- List of electronic trading platforms
- List of finance journals
- List of finance occupations
- List of futures exchanges
- List of major stock exchanges
- List of online brokerages
- List of personal finance software
- Outline of finance
- QuantLib – library which provides tools for software developers and practitioners interested in financial instrument valuation
- Securities research
