= EuroCTP =

Financial services company

EuroCTP B.V.
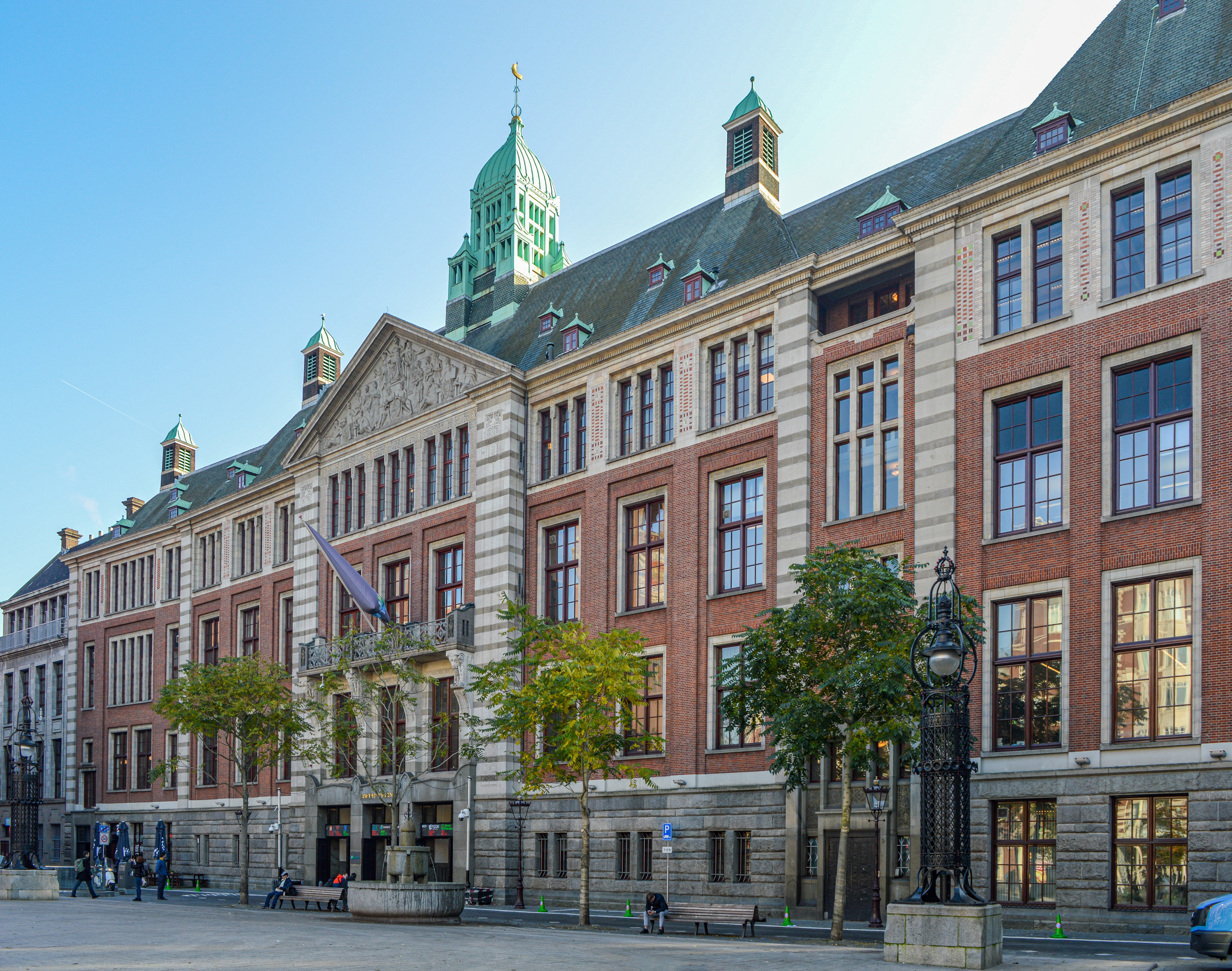
- EuroCTP's registered office.
- Type: Joint venture
- Industry: Financial services
- Founded: 23 August 2023; 3 years ago
- Headquarters: Herengracht 208 , 1016 BS Amsterdam, Netherlands
- Key people: Eglantine Desautel (CEO); Timo Pentner (CTO); Arnaud Labrouve (Finance, Legal & Regulatory); Matthew Dolan (Risk & CISO)
- Products: Consolidated tape (CT) for the European Union (prospective)
- Owners: Bucharest Stock Exchange; Budapest Stock Exchange; Bulgarian Stock Exchange; Cyprus Stock Exchange; Deutsche Boerse; Euronext; Ljubljana Stock Exchange; Luxembourg Stock Exchange; Malta Stock Exchange; Nasdaq Nordic; SIX; Warsaw Stock Exchange; Vienna Stock Exchange
- Website: www.euroctp.eu/en

EuroCTP (European Consolidated Tape Provider) B.V. is a joint venture of 16 bourses, that on 19 December 2025 was selected by the European Securities and Markets Authority (ESMA) to provide the first consolidated tape (CT) for equities (shares and ETFs) in the European Union (EU) for a period of five years, under the Markets in Financial Instruments Directive (MiFIR). This forms part of the European Commission's Capital Markets Union.

For comparison, a similar electronic service, the Consolidated Tape System, has been in place in the United States since 1976. Following Brexit, the United Kingdom's Financial Conduct Authority (FCA) has tabled a CT reform similar to the EU's.

== History ==
=== Background ===
In the EU, financial markets are highly fragmented, with trading occurring across multiple exchanges and alternative trading venues. This makes it difficult for investors to get a clear picture of market activity, particularly in real-time. The EU had been lagging behind the US in this regard, where consolidated tapes have been available for equities since the 1970s.

Bourses had initially signalled reluctance towards the commission's CT plans.

=== 2023–2025: Inception and selection ===
On 16 February 2023, EuroCTP was announced.

On 23 August 2023, EuroCTP was incorporated, and the chair of its supervisory board, Jorge Yzaguirre Scharfhausen, was announced.

On 5 December 2023, the leadership of EuroCTP was announced.

ESMA tender competitors included:

- Jointly: Bloomberg, MarketAxess and Tradeweb. They pulled out of the competition in December 2023.
- Jointly: Barclays, Credit Agricole, Societe Generale, UniCredit and BlackRock
- Jointly: Cboe Global Markets and Aquis Exchange.

On 19 December 2025, EuroCTP was selected by ESMA to provide the EU's first CTP for equities (shares and ETFs) for a period of five years.

=== 2026–present: Launch ===
In May 2026, EuroCTP confirmed industry onboarding was at an advanced stage ahead of its planned go-live. In September they confirmed the project had gone live two months after the planned go live.

== Organisation ==
=== Management Board ===
- Eglantine Desautel (CEO)
- Timo Pentner (CTO)
- Arnaud Labrouve (Head of Finance, Legal and Regulatory Affairs)
- Matthew Dolan (Head of Risk, CISO)

=== Supervisory board ===
The shareholders are represented in the supervisory board of EuroCTP by:

- Marco Estermann (SIX Group)
- Ghislain Bardon (Euronext)
- Nikolai Kosakevich (Nasdaq)
- Frank Hoba (Deutsche Börse)
- Matthias Szabo (Vienna Stock Exchange)
- Manyu Moravenov (Bulgarian Stock Exchange)

=== Founding bourses ===
EuroCTP is a joint venture of the following 16 bourses, which operate regulated markets in all 27 member states of the European Union (EU), as well as European Free Trade Association (EFTA) members Switzerland, Norway and Iceland (the two latter of which form part of the European Economic Area):

- Athens Stock Exchange
- Bratislava Stock Exchange
- Bucharest Stock Exchange
- Budapest Stock Exchange
- Bulgarian Stock Exchange
- Cyprus Stock Exchange
- Deutsche Börse
- Euronext
- Ljubljana Stock Exchange
- Luxembourg Stock Exchange
- Malta Stock Exchange
- Nasdaq Nordic
- SIX
- Warsaw Stock Exchange
- Vienna Stock Exchange
- Zagreb Stock Exchange

== See also ==
- Economy of the European Union
- European Securities and Markets Authority
- European Supervisory Authorities
- European Banking Authority
- List of European stock exchanges
- Banking Union
- MiFid II
- Capital Markets Union
- European Insurance and Occupational Pensions Authority
- Consolidated Tape System
- Securities Information Processor
- Market data
- National market system plan
- Ticker tape
