= Consolidated Quotation System =

Financial information service

The Consolidated Quotation System (CQS) is the electronic service that provides quotation information for stock traded on the American Stock Exchange, New York Stock Exchange, and other regional stock exchanges in the United States and also includes issues traded by FINRA member firms in the third market. Nasdaq processes this data and provides it to its subscribers as the Composite Quotation Service. The initials CQS may be used either for the exchange system or the NASDAQ service.

== History ==
In July 1978, the U.S. Securities and Exchange Commission declared the Consolidated Quotation Plan effective. In August 1978, the CQS commenced full operation with the Boston, Midwest, New York, Philadelphia and Pacific Stock Exchanges reporting quotations in NYSE-listed securities.

NASDAQ joined the CQ Plan at the end of 1978 and began to disseminate quotations over CQS in early 1979.

In November 1979, the Cincinnati Stock Exchange became a CQ Plan Participant and commenced disseminating quotations in mid-1980.

The Consolidated Tape Association (CTA) is the operating authority for both the Consolidated Quotation System and the Consolidated Tape System (CTS).

== See also ==
- Market data
- National market system plan
- Ticker tape
- Consolidated Tape System
- Securities Information Processor
