= Shanghai DZH =

Chinese financial data company

Shanghai DZH Limited
- Trade name: DZH
- Native name: 上海大智慧股份有限公司
- Formerly: Shanghai Great Wisdom
- Type: Public
- Traded as: SSE: 601519
- Industry: Financial services Technology
- Founded: December 14, 2000; 25 years ago
- Founder: Zhang Changhong
- Headquarters: Shanghai, China
- Key people: Zhang Zhihong (Chairman & CEO)
- Revenue: ▼CN¥777.39 million (2023)
- Net income: ▲CN¥85.83 million (2023)
- Total assets: ▼CN¥2.30 billion (2023)
- Total equity: ▲CN¥1.69 billion (2023)
- Number of employees: 2,001 (2023)
- Subsidiaries: AASTOCKS; DZH International
- Website: www.gw.com.cn

Shanghai DZH Limited (DZH; Chinese: 大智慧; pinyin: Dàzhìhuì) is a Chinese financial data and software company headquartered in Shanghai.

== Background ==
The company was originally founded as Shanghai Great Wisdom in December 2000 by Zhang Changhong. At the time, its mainly provided stock software services. It was later renamed to DZH.

In August 2010, DZH acquired AASTOCKS, a Hong Kong fintech platform.

On 28 January 2011 DZH held its initial public offering to become a listed company on the Shanghai Stock Exchange.

On 11 April 2011 Bloomberg L.P. sued DZH on grounds of industrial design infringement and claimed 5 million yuan in compensation. DZH stated the designs used are commonly used in the financial data field. On 23 January 2013, Bloomberg L.P. withdrew the lawsuit.

In August 2014, DZH planned to acquire Xiangcai Securities in a 9 billion yuan deal that would be the largest deal to date between an A-share listed company and an NEEQ listed company as well as the first instance of an internet company purchasing a brokerage firm. The acquisition would gain DZH a broker license and lead to a restructuring to enter the expanding internet finance market. However DZH was under investigation in April 2015 from the China Securities Regulatory Commission (CSRC) for information disclosure violations leading the deal to be terminated on 8 March 2016.

On 4 December 2018, DZH sold its Hong Kong unit to Hundsun Technologies, a company controlled by Jack Ma.

At the time of its listing, DZH had the highest market capitalization among its peers such as Hithink RoyalFlush Information Network and East Money. However afterwards, DZH's profit began to decline due to losses in its financial data and data analysis business. The company has performed poorly since with significant losses each year leading to a decline in its stock prices. DZH had failed to innovate its business lines and could only rely on revenue from financial data and software while domestic rivals overtook it by developing new business lines. The attempt to acquire Xiangcai Securities would have led to a restructuring that had new profit channels however it failed in the end. By 2018, Hithink RoyalFlush Information Network and East Money had increased their revenues by 6 and 11 times respectively while DZH remained unchanged. DZH also failed to control its expenses and made a large number of company acquisitions in a short period that lead to significant impairment of assets.

== Regulatory issues ==
In April 2015, the CSRC started investigating DZH over its 2013 annual report. In the report DZH overstated its profit by 121 million yuan through a variety of methods such as counting as income funds that could be refunded to clients clients and postponing employee bonuses. Zhang was concerned that due to poor performance, DZH would be issued a delisting risk warning by adding "ST" to its stock code and therefore sought to falsely increase its profits. Investors sued DZH stating this misrepresentation caused them losses. In July 2016, the CSRC fined DZH 600,000 yuan for false disclosures. Zhang was fined 300,000 yuan, banned from the securities industry for five years and had to step down from his position as chairman and CEO of the company.

On 26 April 2019, Zhang was arrested by the police on suspicion of illegal disclosure of important information.

In November 2021, the China Securities Investor Service Center on behalf of DZH, sued five executives at DZH including Zhang for 325 million yuan. This was the first time in China that a company launched a lawsuit against its own directors and supervisors. The sum was later changed to 335 million yuan which would be paid to DZH's investors. On 20 February 2023, DZH reached a settlement with Zhang for him to pay the firm 335 million yuan to cover the cost of the compensation. The next day, DZH released a share reduction plan where Zhang would sell up to 122 million of shares which wsa 6% of DZH.

== See also ==
- RoyalFlush Information Network
- East Money
- Financial data vendor
