= Securities Industry Automation Corporation =

The Securities Industry Automation Corporation (SIAC) is a subsidiary of the NYSE Euronext. Its purpose is to provide technical services for the exchanges themselves, members and other financial institutions. In this role, SIAC provides the computers and other systems required to run the exchanges. It also owns communication lines and hardware to provide real-time quotes and transaction information to all market participants from the Consolidated Tape/Ticker System (CTS), Consolidated Quotation System (CQS), and Options Price Reporting Authority (OPRA).

== History ==
SIAC was created on July 17, 1972, as a wholly owned subsidiary of the NYSE and American Stock Exchange. The NYSE owned two thirds of SIAC, while the AMEX owned one third. SIAC initially provided processing services for both NYSE and AMEX's clearing corporations, and continued to do so when these merged into the National Securities Clearing Corporation. As of 2002, the three remained SIAC's main sources of revenue.

On November 1, 2006, NYSE Euronext purchased AMEX's stake for $40 million.

== See also ==
- Options Price Reporting Authority
- Consolidated Tape Association
- Consolidated Quotation System
- Consolidated Tape System
- Securities information processor
- National market system plan
