= European Financial data Institute =

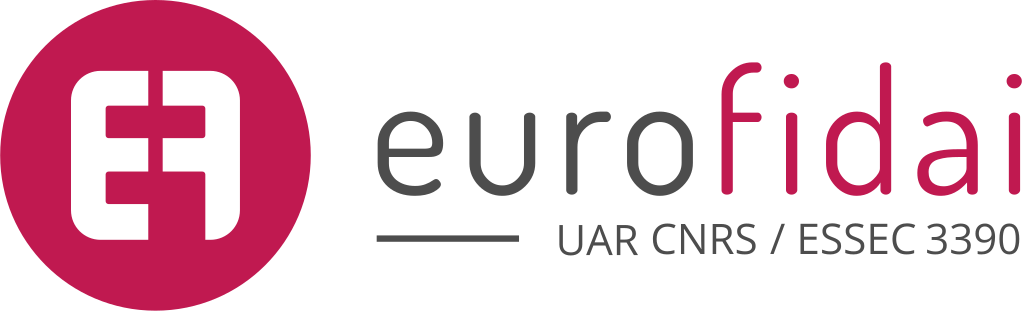
- Formation: 2003
- Type: Governmental organization
- Purpose: Financial research
- Headquarters: Grenoble, France
- Official language: French / English
- Director: Jocelyn Martel
- Main organ: French National Center for Scientific Research
- Website: www.eurofidai.org

The European Financial data Institute (Institut européen de données financières), known as EUROFIDAI is an academic institute of the CNRS (French National Center for Scientific Research) and ESSEC Business School. Its mission is to develop financial and ESG databases for academic researchers.

== Daily market data ==
The EUROFIDAI website makes available European, Asian, Middle-Eastern, Oceanian, African and Latin American market databases for stocks, benchmark indices, global/market indices, mutual funds, corporate events and spot exchange rates.

The institute works to create verified, controlled and homogeneous databases, and maintain them over the long periods necessary for academic research.

== ESG data ==
EUROFIDAI provides ESG data powered by Clarity AI. 105 ESG Raw Data metrics on more than 70 000 corporations worldwide are available to academic researchers. Historical annual data with monthly updates.

== High Frequency market data ==
The EUROFIDAI High Frequency database covers various aspects of market data, including orders, trades, and reference data. They provide data with precision ranging from nanoseconds to milliseconds, depending on the specific market. Additionally, these databases include computed variables such as liquidity and realized variance. Markets included are London Stock Exchange, Turquoise, CBOE Europe BXE/CXE/DXE, Deutsche Boerse Xetra, Euronext Paris and Eurex (derivatives markets).

== EUROFIDAI-ESSEC Paris December Finance Meeting ==
Every December, EUROFIDAI and ESSEC organize the EUROFIDAI-ESSEC Paris December Finance Meeting, gathering finance researchers from all over the world. The event gives the opportunity for researchers to present their latest research in all areas of finance. In recent years, the conference has gained recognition for its selectivity, with only one in six submitted papers accepted. The EUROFIDAI-ESSEC Paris December Finance Meeting is notable for its global standing, ranking 2nd in Europe and 8th in the world among large conferences, as measured by papers published in the Top 3 Finance and Top 5 Economics journals.
