= National market system plan =

A national market system plan (or NMS plan) is a structured method of transmitting securities transactions in real-time. In the United States, national market systems are governed by section 11A of the Securities Exchange Act of 1934.

In addition to processing the transactions themselves, these plans also emit the price, volume data, and regulatory auditing information for these transactions. Information on each securities trade is sent to a central network at the Securities Industry Automation Corporation (SIAC) where it is then distributed, consolidated with other trades on the same "tape".

There are three major tapes in the United States: Tape A and Tape B (which together are called the "Consolidated Tape"), and Tape C.

== CTA Plan ==
The CTA SIP handles Tape A and Tape B securities and provides two feeds: the Consolidated Quotation System (CQS) for quotes and, the NBBO, and the Consolidated Tape System (CTS) for trades.

== UTP Plan ==
The UTP SIP handles Tape C securities and provides two feeds, the UQDF for quotes and the NBBO and the UTDF for trades. Tape C contains stocks listed on NASDAQ, and is overseen by the UTP Plsn.

== OPRA Plan ==
The Options Price Reporting Authority provides trade and quote information for all U.S. options exchanges.

== See also ==
- Consolidated Tape System
- Ticker tape
- Securities information processor
- UTP Plan
- CTA Plan
