= ShareScope =

- Developer: Ionic Information
- Stable release: 7.0 / December 2019
- Operating system: Windows
- Type: Investment & Trading Software
- License: proprietary
- Website: http://www.sharescope.co.uk

ShareScope is an all-encompassing software package created by Ionic Information, which is tailored for individual investors. It offers data analysis, portfolio management, and charting capabilities.

All products supply news from Alliance news. All versions of ShareScope/SharePad allow users to analyse the data using both fundamental analysis and technical analysis.

== History ==
In 2015, Ionic Information launched SharePad, a web-based platform.

== Data sources ==
SharePad and ShareScope provide data for:

- Shares
- Exchange-traded funds
- Unit trusts
- Investment trusts
- Gilt-edged securities, European Central Bank and US Treasuries bonds
- Stock market indices - all major and many minor indices
- Corporate bonds
- Selected Commodities
- Foreign exchange market
- Warrants
- Market sector Price–earnings ratios and yields
- Other instruments used to trade on various markets such as Permanent interest bearing shares, American Depositary Receipts and Global Depository Receipts.

Data is received from:

- London Stock Exchange
- Nasdaq
- New York Stock Exchange
- CME (Chicago)
- European exchanges

== Add-ons ==
- Alpesh Patel Special Edition is an add-on to all versions of ShareScope, which includes Alpesh's own stock-screening filters, chart set-ups, stock commentary and a monthly newsletter delivered via ShareScope.
- Level 2 data from the London Stock Exchange is also available as an add-on for ShareScope Gold and ShareScope Plus. It is included free in ShareScope Pro and SharePad Pro.

== Scripting language ==
ShareScope customers can also make use of ShareScript, a scripting language based on JavaScript, that forms part of the functionality of ShareScope Plus and ShareScope Pro.

Users can share ShareScripts via an online library and ask for help from each other and ShareScope Support staff on ShareScope's dedicated forums.

== Awards ==
ShareScope has been the recipient of 47 awards in 19 years, including the UK's Best Investment Software for the last 12 years running. Awards include:

Investors Chronicle

- Best Investment Software: every year 2002 to 2019 excluding 2007
- Best Level 2 Data Provider: 2008
- Services to Private investors: Martin Stamp 2017

Shares magazine Best Investment Software, 2002-2015 and 2017

MoneyWeek Best Investment Software Provider, 2014.
