= Shen Jun =

Shen Jun may refer to:

- Shen Jun (archer) (born 1972), Chinese archer
- Shen Jun (businessman) (born 1970), Chinese businessman
- Shen Jun (judoka) (born 1977), Chinese judoka
- Shen Jun (footballer) (born 1986), Chinese footballer
