= Reference data (financial markets) =

Reference data is a catch all term used in the finance industry to describe counterparty and security identifiers used when making a trade. As opposed to market data the reference data is used to complete financial transactions and settle those transactions. The financial service industry and regulatory agencies have pursued a policy of standardizing the reference data that define and describe such transactions.

At its most basic level, reference data for a simple sale of a stock in exchange for cash on a highly liquid stock exchange involves a standard label for the underlying security (e.g., its ISIN), the identity of the seller, the buyer, the broker-dealer(s), the price, etc. At its most complex, reference data covers all relevant particulars for highly complex transactions with multiple dependencies, entities, and contingencies.

== History ==
=== Standardisation efforts ===
The background for this policy is the risk that transactions fail and are reversed because contractual terms were misunderstood or ambiguous. In addition, the lag between the trade and ultimate settlement of the transaction may include various events that affect various elements of the transaction.

Efforts to standardize reference data are complicated by a number of factors, including:

- Semantic differences in common terminology
- The sheer number of data elements that make up transactions
- Rapidly changing markets, products, and underlying events
- Static Data
- Dynamic Data
- Bounded Data

As a result, work to standardize reference data is broadly considered to be an ongoing effort rather than a series of discrete programs.

== Types of Data ==
There are many fields included in reference data. Some of the most common include:

- Instrument classification (ISO 10962) (e.g., large vs small, tenor, region, sector)
- Sale information (e.g., ISIN, seller identity, buyer, price)
- Market Identifier Codes (ISO 10383 MIC)

== See also ==
- Clearing house (finance)
- Electronic trading platform
- Financial Information eXchange (FIX)
- Financial products Markup Language (FpML)
- International Swaps and Derivatives Association (ISDA)
- International Securities Identification Number (ISIN)
- Legal Entity Identifier (LEI)
- Market data
- Same-day affirmation (SDA)
- Straight through processing (STP)
