= Unlisted Trading Privileges =

Unlisted Trading Privileges (UTP) oversees the Securities Information Processor for securities listed on Nasdaq and other securities that do not meet the requirements for listing on an exchange.

== Acquisition and distribution of market data ==
Nasdaq established the UTP Plan to outline the consolidation and distribution of data through one centralized resource called the Securities Information Processor (SIP).

The securities listed on Nasdaq can be quoted and traded from any US exchange. Trades and quotes on these securities are distributed on two separate feeds, the UTP Quotation Data Feed (UQDF) and the UTP Trade Data Feed (UTDF).

UQDF provides traders a direct view of an NBBO. These feeds are considered level 1 or the top-of-book.

== National Market System (NMS) plan ==
The NMS Plan regulates the UTP and Consolidated Tape Association (CTA) networks. The particulars for executing the regulation requires real-time reporting of transactions and their volumes, prices, and auditing details.

== UTP and CTA ==
Not all quote or transaction data are available from a single provider. The quotes and trades of Cboe and NYSE listed securities are consolidated in line with the Consolidated Tape Association (CTA). The Consolidated Tape Association distributes trades and quotes across the Consolidated Tape System (CTS) and the Consolidated Quote System (CQS) feeds. The CTA and CQS are listed across two tapes – A and B. UTP is tape C.

== Market data fees for the UTP (Tape C) network ==
- Co-location/Direct Access: $2,500
- Feed or Internet/Indirect Access: $500
- Non-display: $3,500
- Redistribution: $1,000
- Display (per 20 devices): $480

== Participants ==
The current participants of the UTP Plan include:

- Cboe BYX Exchange
- Cboe BZX Exchange
- Cboe EDGA Exchange
- Cboe EDGX Exchange
- Cboe Exchange
- Financial Industry Regulatory Authority
- Investors' Exchange
- Long-Term Stock Exchange
- Members Exchange
- MIAX Pearl Equities
- Nasdaq BX
- Nasdaq PHLX
- Nasdaq Stock Market
- Nasdaq ISE
- New York Stock Exchange
- NYSE Arca
- NYSE American
- NYSE National
- NYSE Chicago

== See also ==
- Securities Information Processor
- Consolidated Tape Association
- Market data
- Financial data vendors
