= OPRA =

OPRA can refer to:

- Options Price Reporting Authority an American financial markets data authority
- Occupational Pensions Regulatory Authority, a former UK government body
- Open Public Records Act in New Jersey
