= Zhang Changhong =

Zhang Changhong may refer to:

- Zhang Changhong (businessman)
- Zhang Changhong (sport shooter)
