= Consolidated Tape System =

Financial information system

The Consolidated Tape System (CTS) is the United States electronic service, introduced in April 1976, that provides last sale and trade data for issues admitted to dealings on the American Stock Exchange, New York Stock Exchange, and U.S. regional stock exchanges.

The Consolidated Tape Association (CTA) is the operating authority for both the Consolidated Quotation System (CQS) and the Consolidated Tape System (CTS).

== Other countries ==
=== European Union ===
EuroCTP is a joint venture established in 2023 by 14 bourses, which aims to provide a consolidated tape (CT) in financial trading within the EU. This forms part of the European Commission's Capital Markets Union.

=== United Kingdom ===
In July 2023, the UK's Financial Conduct Authority (FCA) announced it was setting up a 'consolidated tape' system for City traders. As well as cutting costs and improving the quality of data, the FCA said the reforms would "increase transparency and access to trading data". The consolidated tape system is to be set up initially for the UK's bonds market followed by equities. A competitive tender process is to be opened up that would see a single firm providing the CT for bonds.

== See also ==
- Securities Information Processor
- Market data
- National market system plan
- Ticker tape
