= Financial data vendor =

Firms that sell access to financial data

A financial data vendor provides market data to financial firms, traders, and investors. The data distributed is collected from sources such as stock exchange feeds, brokers and dealer desks or regulatory filings (e.g. an SEC filing).

== History ==
Financial data vendors have been in existence as long as financial data has been available. The first technology that allowed data vendors to disseminate was the ticker tape starting in the 1870s. Financial data includes "pre-trade" such as bid-ask data necessary to price a financial instrument and post-trade data such as the last trade price and other transaction data.

From ticker tape to television cameras, from databases to websites this multibillion-dollar industry provides data utilized in the financial sector. Paper ticker tape became obsolete in the 1960s, as television and computers were increasingly used to transmit financial information. The concept of the stock ticker lives on, however, in the scrolling electronic tickers seen on brokerage walls and on news and financial television channels.

Because the financial investment needed to provide the services needed, the industry had become ever more consolidated, but in 2004 it was forecast that the industry was beginning to fragment.

== Industry size ==
According to the 2009 Burton-Taylor report, the Market Data industry exited 2009 at US$22.68 billion after closing 2008 at US$23.01 billion. In 2009, Thomson Reuters and Bloomberg market share were virtually even, at 29.4% and 29.2% respectively.

As of 2008, the largest four financial data vendors capture the $15.222 billion in annual revenues and employ tens of thousands of people.

== Types of data ==
There are many different types of instruments (including stocks, bonds, funds, options, futures, currencies, etc.) and hundreds of different markets for investment, leading to an extremely large and hard to define universe of data.

The types of data offered vary by vendor, and most typically cover information about entities (companies) and instruments (shares, bonds etc.) which companies might issue. Typically, pricing data is sold separately from other related data, such as corporate actions and events, valuation information, fundamental data including company performance and reference data on the entities and instruments themselves.

In addition to market price data there are data known as market reference data, such as a ticker name, which describe securities, commodities and transactions.

Intraday data is any data that is released within the same day or trading session.

The majority of financial data vendors can access data during trading sessions but with the requirement that any inquiry be in reference to historical market analysis. Analysis of historical market data provides a larger snapshot of the market at the expense of timely information (time in between database updates).

Alternative data (finance) vendors offer non-traditional datasets, typically defined as those that do not originate from securities exchanges, regulatory disclosures, or economic release indicators. Quantitative and fundamental investors use these to enhance portfolio returns. Examples include consumer transaction data, satellite imagery, vehicle movements, web data, and social media data. With an estimated three out of four financial institutions housing alt-data teams as of 2020, and 90% of firms expanding their alt-data strategy, alternative data is now arguably mainstream.

There are also other non-traditional that aid sales and marketing teams with financial information about companies in order to make their job selling easier. These databases house data such as funding signals, M&A notifications, and regulatory red flags.

== Services offered ==
Most of the market differentiation between competitors is based on some combination of the following:

- Delivery frequency - Data can be updated in real-time, delayed, conflated, or end of day.
- Delivery latency - vendors offer different amounts of data latency, with lower latency typically being more expensive and more complex. An individual vendor may offer different products with different latencies.
- Delivery method - Data is delivered either in a streaming format, or as snapshot files of streamed data, or as "end of day" files showing the position at the close of business of a certain market or region
- Delivery transportation - Data can be delivered via Broadcast, Multicast, Satellite, Private Line, VPN, or Internet
- Delivery format - Data can be encoded heavily to optimize performance, or can be left in simple formats to simplify databasing
- Normalization and Data Model - Vendors collect from sources all around the world and then translates all of those formats into a single format (by vendor or by product) for consumption by either a financial data processor or by the end user. Each vendor typically has a different way of modelling financial data.
- Reliability - High availability of data is a primary concern in the financial markets
- Value Added Services - Data value can be improved by adding on related services such as listing information, share data, fundamental data, time series, historical data, etc.
- Local experience - Larger data vendors have sales and service offices and data centers worldwide in major financial centers in the US, Europe and Asia. This allows their customers to access local expertise without having to have a local presence.

== List of financial data vendors ==
The following are some notable financial data vendors that distribute data from multiple exchanges:

- Bloomberg
- Factset
- Fidessa
- Hithink RoyalFlush Information Network
- ICE Data Services
- ION Group
- Markit
- Morningstar
- Refinitiv
- Shanghai DZH
- SIX Financial Information
- Wind Information
- Zero2IPO

== See also ==
- Bloomberg Terminal
- Eikon
- List of financial market information services
- Reference data (financial markets)
