= Investment Data Standards Organization =

- Abbreviation: IDSO
- Formation: October 23, 2017; 7 years ago
- Type: Non-governmental organization
- Purpose: Standards & best practices
- Headquarters: Manhattan, New York City, United States
- Website: www.investmentdata.org

The Investment Data Standards Organization (IDSO) is a U.S.-based organization that publishes Alternative Data standards for the finance industry. IDSO was established to support the growth of the Alternative Data industry through the creation, development, and maintenance of industry-wide standards and best practices. IDSO is a non-profit 501(c)(6) organization made up of companies in the Alternative Data industry such as data originators, intermediaries, and institutional investment funds.

== Overview ==
The Investment Data Standards Organization is an independent, non-governmental organization that publishes Alternative Data standards and best practices for personally identifiable information (PII), web crawling, and other security and compliance-related topics. Consisting of companies in the Alternative Data industry such as data originators, research providers, aggregators, and investment funds, the Investment Data Standards Organization (IDSO) represents the interests of Alternative Data industry participants and supports the acceptance and adoption of Alternative Data by institutional investors. The use of standards enables robust and reliable Alternative Data products and services that meet U.S. privacy and security requirements.

== Membership ==
IDSO serves investment managers and compliance teams in the Alternative Data industry who are interested in regulatory guidance. Companies that participate in the Alternative Data ecosystem include:

1. Raw data originators, who collect or generate data,
2. Research providers, who produce original research and derived signals,
3. Aggregators, who enrich and aggregate data, and
4. Investment funds, who use data to add value to their investment process.

IDSO publications are developed by working groups composed of representatives from these Alternative Data organizations. IDSO members work together in teams to create and edit standards and best practices.

== Membership Functions ==
Investment Data Standards Organization (IDSO) members access IDSO publications, interact with industry participants, and drive change to help shape the future of the Alternative Data industry.

== Publications ==
IDSO's main products are standards, checklists, technical reports, technical specifications, and guides. The standards currently available are related to personally identifiable information (PII), web crawling, and dataset compliance for sensitive information (SI):

1. Personally identifiable information (PII): The PII publications develop processes and risk management strategies for identifying, maintaining, and securing personally identifiable information (PII) in data sets used for investment management.
2. Web crawling: The web crawling publications provide processes and procedures for data harvested or scraped from the web.
3. Dataset compliance for sensitive information (SI): The dataset compliance publications assign a dataset compliance-level to datasets that contain sensitive information (SI).
