= Investing.com =

Online finance portal

investing.com
- Available in: 44 languages
- Headquarters: Tel Aviv, Israel; Nicosia, Cyprus;
- Owner: Joffre Capital
- Founders: Dror Efrat, Lonny Szneiberg
- Key people: Omer Shvili (CEO), Ding’an Fei (Chairman)
- Products: Financial information
- Employees: 300 (2019)
- Website: investing.com/about-us
- Launched: 2007
- Current status: Active

Investing.com is a financial data and news platform founded in 2007. Based in Israel, it ranks among the most visited financial websites globally. The site provides free access to real-time quotes, analysis, and market tools in dozens of languages. Historically reliant on advertising, the company added premium subscriptions with the launch of InvestingPro in 2022. The company has been owned by Hong Kong–based investment firm Joffre Capital since 2021.

Investing.com aggregates content from external sources and has increasingly adopted AI-assisted content production. In 2023, Semafor reported that some of its AI-assisted articles closely resembled reporting published shortly beforehand by other outlets without crediting the original sources.

== History ==
The company was founded in 2007 by Israeli entrepreneur Dror Efrat, Russian entrepreneur Lonny Szneiberg and two other co-founders, initially under the name Forexpros.

The company was registered and headquartered in Cyprus, but the majority of employees and the CEO resided in Israel.

At the beginning, the portal offered forex analysis, a broker directory, and a discussion forum in English, Spanish, Hebrew and Arabic. During 2008–2009, more editions were added, and the platform expanded its offering from Forex data to encompass other financial instruments. The content was free and revenue came from advertising. The company grew rapidly; Globes later attributed part of its growth to the 2008 financial crisis and heightened market volatility.

As of Q2 2012 Forexpros had 2.7 million unique visitors and 35 million pageviews per month, and a headcount of 70. In late 2012, ForexPros was rebranded Investing.com.

The company purchased its current domain, Investing.com, for $2.45 million in December 2012 in one of the most expensive domain-name sales at the time.

Investing.com's Android app was launched in September 2013, while an iOS version of the app was launched a year later. Over time, it added additional localized editions and services.

Investing.com launched a new version of its cryptocurrency app in 2017.

In April 2018, Mickey Winitsky replaced Itay Gissin as CEO. Winitsky announced an expansion strategy for 2018–19. In July 2018, Investing.com signed a memorandum of understanding with TokenPost, a cryptocurrency news website in South Korea. In September 2018, Investing.com launched AllRates, a personal finance website.

In July 2019, Investing.com launched Investing Money, its personal finance vertical. AllRates, launched a year earlier, was merged into Investing Money. As of 2019, Investing.com had 300 employees across Tel Aviv, Madrid, Milan, Tokyo, Mumbai, Seoul, Shenzhen, São Paulo, and Mexico City.

In November 2019, Omer Shvili was appointed CEO, replacing Mickey Winitsky and ending the company's co-CEO structure. Shvili intended to scale down side projects recently introduced by his predecessors and to concentrate the company's activity on its core business.

In February 2021, Investing.com was ranked as the 194th most popular website in the world, according to Alexa, and one of the top three financial portals.

As of April 2021, Investing.com was available in 24 languages and reported more than 199 million monthly visits. According to its founders, Investing.com's business model focused on aggregating news and data from hundreds of sources rather than independent journalism, which made it easier to scale up to new languages. In 2021, the company was acquired by Hong Kong–based Joffre Capital for $500 million. Following the acquisition, Ding’an Fei was appointed chairman of Investing.com. After receiving tax incentives in Israel as a tech company, Investing.com moved its management to Israel and expanded its operations there.

In May 2022, Investing.com launched its premium subscription InvestingPro. In March 2023, the company acquired StreetInsider.com, a Michigan-based stock market news and analysis service provider. Most StreetInsider content became available on Investing.com free of charge, while some was made available to InvestingPro subscribers. By that point, Investing.com had reached 60 million unique visitors across 136 countries.

In 2023, Ding’an Fei said Investing.com was considering an eventual IPO and was seeking acquisitions ahead of a possible listing.

A 2025 Chainstory analysis estimated that 54.8% of Investing.com articles in its sample during the first half of the year involved AI-generated or AI-assisted content. The platform was available in 33 languages.

In April 2025, Investing.com launched WarrenAI, an AI-powered financial assistant. In April 2026, the company acquired AI-powered investing assistant Stonki to expand AI tools that monitor user-defined investment strategies.

== Business model and revenues ==
In a 2016 interview with Finance Magnates, Dror Efrat attributed Investing.com's growth in part to its multilingual offering and its reliance on content aggregation, which made expansion into additional languages easier and less expensive. In 2019, then-CEO Shlomi Biger said the company had recorded $50 million in revenue in FY2018 and expected revenue of $60 million in FY2019. According to Biger, its advertisers included "financial brokerage firms, banks, ad-networks, and luxury brands".

In December 2023, Semafor reported that Investing.com had published AI-assisted articles that closely resembled stories released hours earlier by The Motley Fool, FXStreet, and CryptoNewsLand, in some cases drawing on similar data points, arguments, or sources without crediting the original outlet. Semafor noted that Investing.com disclosed its use of AI and human editorial review. Representatives of FXStreet and The Motley Fool criticized the practice and raised concerns about plagiarism and its effect on original reporting.

In May 2022, Investing.com launched the paid InvestingPro subscription, adding premium tools and some gated content alongside its advertising-supported free service. Investing.com has also faced criticism for allegedly monetizing user registrations by passing contact details to unlicensed offshore brokers, leading to unsolicited marketing calls.

== See also ==
- List of financial market information services
