= ADT Inc. =

American security systems firm

- Formerly: American District Telegraph Company (1874–1968); ADT, Inc. (1968–1997); ADT Limted (1997); ADT Security Services, Inc. (1997–2012); The ADT Corporation (2012–2017)
- Type: Public
- Traded as: NYSE: ADT; Russell 1000 component; S&P 600 component
- Industry: Burglary; Fire and carbon monoxide detection; Health safety; Cybersecurity; Security systems; Communication systems; Video surveillance; Access control; RFID
- Founded: August 14, 1874; 152 years ago (as American District Telegraph)
- Headquarters: Boca Raton, Florida, U.S.
- Key people: Jim DeVries (Chairman and CEO); Donald Young (COO)
- Services: Security Services
- Revenue: ▲US$5.13 billion (2025)
- Net income: ▲US$596 million (2025)
- Owners: Apollo Global Management (46%); State Farm Insurance (15%); Google (6%)
- Number of employees: 12,800 (2024)
- Parent: Tyco International (1997–2012)
- Website: www.adt.com

ADT Inc., formerly the ADT Corporation, is an American security company that provides residential and small business electronic security, fire protection, and other related alarm monitoring services throughout the United States and Canada. The corporate head office is located in Boca Raton, Florida. In February 2016, the company was acquired by Apollo Global Management for $6.9 billion in a leveraged buyout. In January 2018, the company went public on the New York Stock Exchange.

== History ==
In 1863, Edward A. Calahan invented a stock ticker and formed the Gold and Stock Telegraph Company in 1867 to exploit the technology. Gold and Stock also developed a messenger system that sent instructions to and from the stock exchange floor. Three years later, the president of Gold and Stock Telegraph Company woke up to a burglar in his home, which inspired him to create a telegraph-based alert system. This system eventually connected 50 of his neighbors to a central station, where all the alert boxes were monitored.

There were many small telegraph delivery companies in the United States in the 19th century. In 1874, 57 district telegraph delivery companies affiliated and became American District Telegraph (ADT). With the increase in telephone usage in the late 19th century, ADT's messenger business slowly declined in popularity. ADT tried branching out and developing their signaling business while still maintaining their telegraph business as their primary income source.

ADT incorporated into Western Union in 1901 and separated its messenger business from its main signaling business at that time. In 1909, Western Union and ADT came under the control of American Telephone & Telegraph Company (AT&T). ADT began to expand into new areas, such as fire alarms and security alarms, between 1910 and 1930, but was kept separate from AT&T's Holmes alarm business. ADT became a publicly traded company in the 1960s.

In 1964, ADT was found to be a monopoly in restraint of trade. It was shown to provide almost 80% of the central station alarm service in the United States. In some cities, such as New York City and Memphis, Tennessee, they were the sole provider. They were also found to have forced competitors out of business by lowering prices below cost. They would charge national accounts very low prices in cities with competitors and much higher prices where no competition was available. ADT was forced to adopt a national price list, which could not be varied, to help establish central station competitors in cities without competition and to pay fines and triple damages to the federal government, customers, and local competitors.

In early 1987, the firm Hawley Goodall, owned by Michael Ashcroft, bought the Indianapolis-based Crime Control Inc., the fourth-largest company in the U.S. security market, for $50 million. Later in the year, it bought ADT and moved to Bermuda. This purchase transformed Hawley into the leading security services business in the United States and resulted in the majority of its revenues coming from the North American market. As a result of the acquisition, Hawley changed its name to ADT Limited and decided to refocus its business around security services. At the end of 1987, the company sold its North American-based facility services business to Denmark's ISS A/S.

In 1997, ADT was purchased by Tyco International in a reverse takeover.

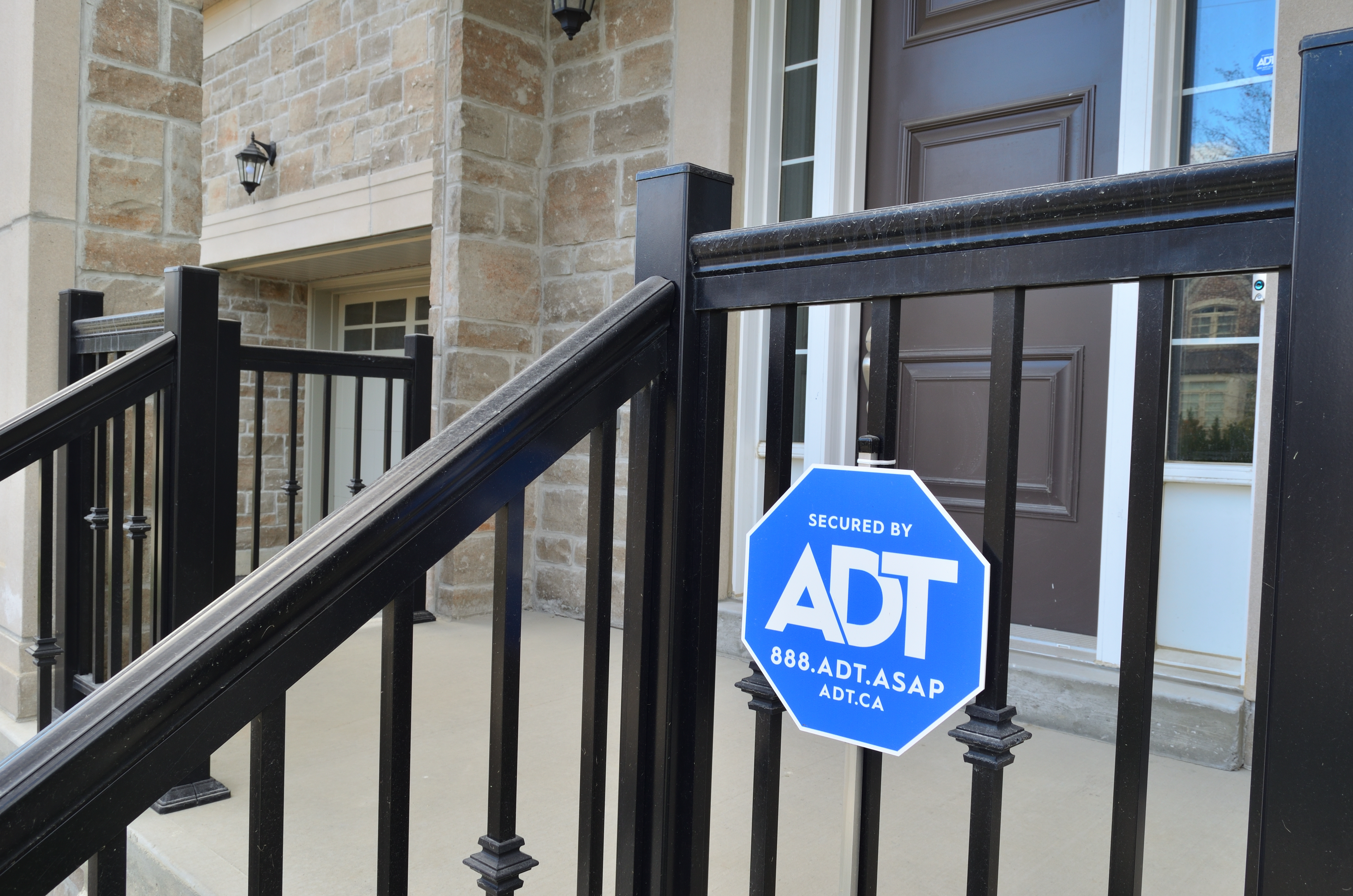
Yard sign indicating the presence of an ADT system at a home

In January 2010, Tyco acquired Broadview Security (formerly Brink's Home Security), then ADT's largest competitor, for $2 billion. When the acquisition closed later that year, the Broadview name was discontinued, and Broadview's operations were integrated into ADT.

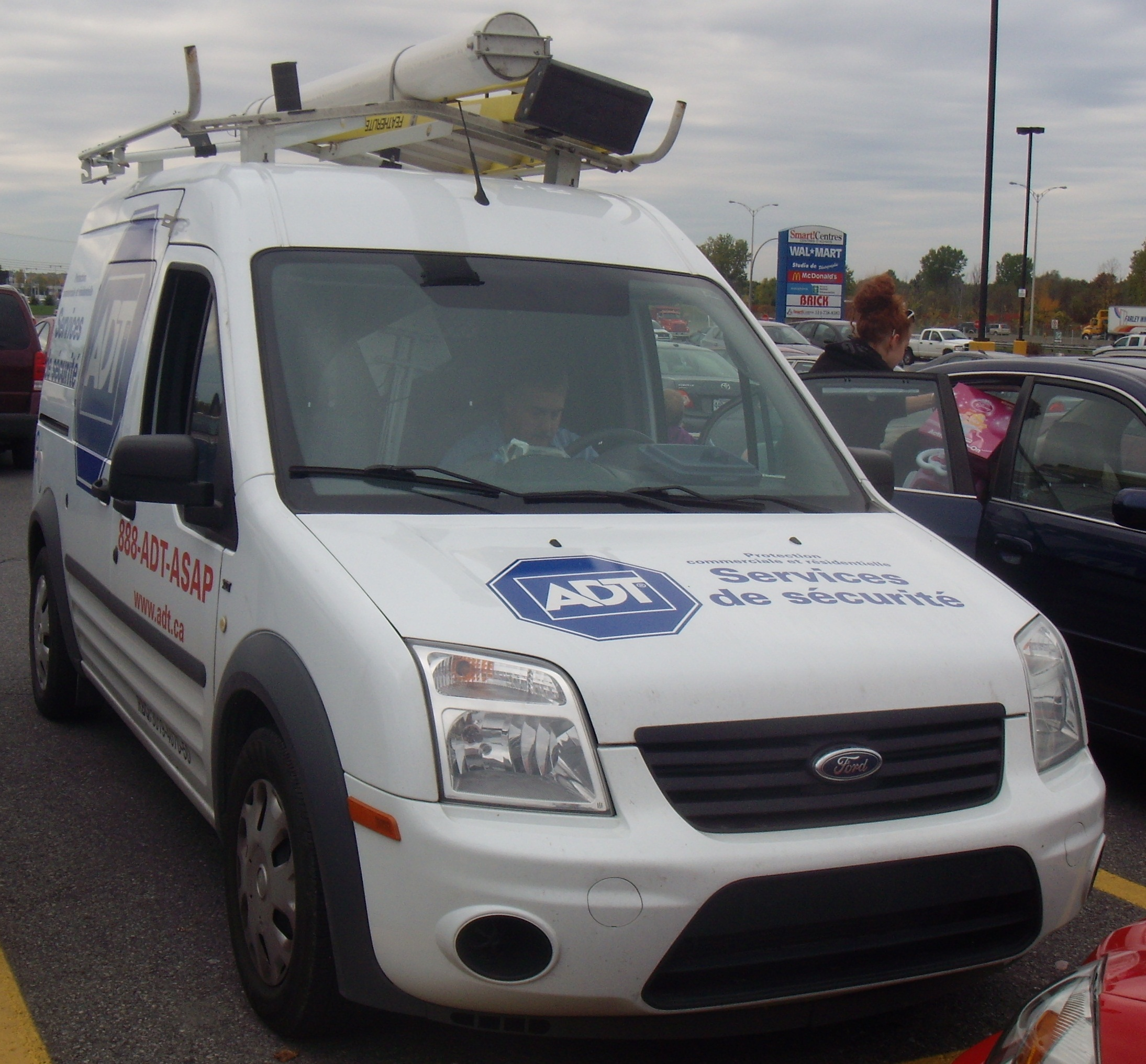
ADT Service vehicle in Quebec, 2010

In September 2011, Tyco announced that it would split into three companies, ADT being one of the three. On October 1, 2012, ADT debuted as an independent public company and began trading on the New York Stock Exchange (NYSE: ADT). In 2014, it acquired the Canadian company Reliance Protectron Security Services from Reliance Home Comfort for a total of Can$555 million.

In February 2016, Apollo Global Management acquired ADT for nearly $7 billion and merged it with another home security firm, Protection 1. The purchase price represented a premium of approximately 56 percent over ADT's closing share price on February 12, 2016, and when combined with Protection 1, represented an aggregate transaction value of approximately $15 billion. The company went public again in January 2018 and again on the New York Stock Exchange under the ticker symbol ADT. As of 2023, Apollo still retains a majority share in ADT.

In April 2018, ADT acquired Aronson Security Group Inc. and Acme Security Systems as part of its commercial expansion plans.

In October 2019, Telus Corporation purchased all of ADT's Canadian assets for $700 million. By September 2020, Telus had renamed ADT's Canadian operations to Telus SmartHome Security.

In August 2020, Google announced that it would invest $450 million in ADT in exchange for a 6.6% equity stake. The partnership will leverage ADT's network of installers to sell and install Nest devices, and aim to integrate Google's AI and Nest smart home devices into ADT's services.

In November 2021, ADT announced an agreement to acquire Sunpro Solar, a residential rooftop solar power contractor, for $160 million in cash plus approximately 77.8 million shares of ADT common stock, implying a total enterprise value of approximately $825 million. The company was rebranded as "ADT Solar" and operates as a wholly owned subsidiary of ADT. On January 24, 2024, ADT announced that due to financial difficulties they will be closing their solar division.

In September 2022, State Farm announced that it would invest $1.2 billion in ADT in exchange for a 15% equity stake, and that it would commit up to $300 million to an "opportunity fund" to support ADT's marketing, technology, and innovation. At the same time, Google separately announced it would commit a further $150 million into a "success fund" for ADT.

On July 10, 2023, ADT disclosed that errors were identified in regards to their non-cash goodwill impairment losses associated with their Solar reporting unit and related tax impacts. These errors were identified during the third quarter of 2022 and the first quarter of 2023. As a result, the company announced that their financial results for the third and fourth quarter of 2022 and the first quarter of 2023 would be restated. Consequently, investors were negatively impacted as ADT's stock price decreased during trading, the following day.

ADT completed divesting its commercial security, fire and life safety business unit to private equity firm GTCR for $1.6 billion in October 2023.

In October 2026 it was announced that Thrive Holdings is acquiring ADT in an all-cash deal valued at $7.6 billion.

== Operations ==
As of March 2019, ADT had nine monitoring centers and a network of more than 17,000 professionals, serving 6 million customers in over 200 locations throughout the United States.
