= RatingDog =

Chinese financial technology company

- Shenzhen RatingDog Information Technology Co., Ltd.
- Formation: 2017; 9 years ago
- Founder: Yao Yu
- Founded at: Shenzhen
- Headquarters: Shenzhen
- Location: Shenzhen, China
- Region served: China
- Products: RatingDog China PMI
- Services: credit rating
- Fields: credit rating
- Leader: Yao Yu
- Key people: Yao Yu
- Website: www.ratingdog.cn

RatingDog, formally known as Shenzhen RatingDog Information Technology Co., Ltd., is a Chinese financial technology and credit research firm headquartered in Shenzhen. The company specializes in providing independent credit analysis, bond market data, and macroeconomic indicators to global institutional investors. In 2025, the firm achieved significant international visibility by becoming the title sponsor of the S&P Global China PMI (Purchasing Managers' Index), a widely cited metric for evaluating the performance of the Chinese private sector.

RatingDog is a privately held entity backed by major institutional investors, including Wind Information and China Securities Credit Promotion. Its client base includes more than 200 global and domestic financial institutions. The firm's data is often compared against official government figures from the National Bureau of Statistics (NBS) to provide a more comprehensive view of the Chinese economy, particularly regarding private-sector health and employment trends.

== History ==
RatingDog was established in 2017 by Yao Yu, an industry veteran with extensive experience in the Chinese credit rating sector. The company was initially incubated by China Securities Credit Promotion Co., Ltd. and grew as a specialized provider of independent credit research for the domestic bond market. A major turning point occurred in December 2023 when Wind Information, the leading provider of financial data in mainland China, made a strategic investment in the firm. This partnership allowed RatingDog's specialized credit research to be integrated into the Wind terminal, the primary data tool used by financial professionals in China. In mid-2025, the firm reached a naming rights agreement with S&P Global to rebrand the "Caixin PMI" as the RatingDog China PMI, effective from August of that year.

== Operations ==
The company operates a Software-as-a-Service (SaaS) platform that provides coverage for over 8,000 Chinese bond issuers. Its primary business involves producing independent credit ratings under the YY Rating brand, which offers an alternative perspective to traditional state-sanctioned ratings. These services are frequently used by hedge funds, commercial banks, and asset managers to assess the risks associated with high-yield bonds and Local Government Financing Vehicles (LGFVs).

The RatingDog China PMI serves as an economic indicator consisting of monthly manufacturing and services surveys. Although the index bears the RatingDog name, S&P Global maintains responsibility for the data compilation and methodology. The survey focuses on a sample of over 650 companies, with a specific emphasis on small and medium-sized enterprises (SMEs). For example, as of early January 2026, the index showed the manufacturing sector returning to a fractional expansion with a reading of 50.1, while the services sector reached a six-month low of 52.0, reflecting a complex economic environment of modest domestic growth and softening foreign demand.
