= Straight-Through Quality =

Straight-Through Quality (STQ) are approaches and outputs of test automation that have quality and deliver business benefit. STQ takes its name from the business concept of straight-through processing (STP). Also acting as a tool and enabler for STP.

Traditional techniques for testing and delivery have often required a great deal of manual support and intervention. These approaches are subject to human error, cost of delay and lack of reuse. These also have the negative side-effect of being unable to deliver 'fail-fast' approaches, which have proven popular with Agile practitioners. Previous traditional approaches have been typically expensive where whole silo'ed departments are created within commercial companies to deliver Quality and Deployment alone. Thus STQ as an approach hopes to resolve this problem.

== Examples ==
Tangible examples of STQ approaches in the software industry are present and often known as continuous integration (CI) and continuous delivery (CD). These combined can ensure that software delivery is integrated, automatically tested and ready for automatic delivery at any time. Together CI/CD can enable STQ which can be used as Business output terminology for business users who do not understand the technical complexities of CI/CD.

== See also ==
- Straight-through processing
- Continuous integration
- Continuous delivery
