= Edward A. Calahan =

American inventor

- Born: 1838; Boston, Massachusetts
- Died: 1912 (aged 73–74)
- Occupation: Inventor
- Known for: Invention of ticker tape, gold and stock tickers, multiplex telegraph system

Edward Augustin Calahan (1838–1912) was an American inventor, credited with invention of a ticker tape, gold and stock tickers, and a multiplex telegraph system.

Calahan was born in Boston, Massachusetts. He left school at the age of 11 to pursue his interest to be part of a modern business.

Calahan came to New York in 1861 and made his residence in Brooklyn. He joined as chief telegrapher in Western Union telegraph company's New York office at Manhattan. While working with Western Union, he encountered a group of rushing messenger boys which inspired him to improve exchange communications. These young men called runners had to dash from the Stock Exchange to their offices to report the changes in share values. Calahan realized that the prices could be sent directly via telegraph to each broker's office much more quickly and efficiently in a permanent stream of information. With the idea, he invented the ticker tape in 1867. After many years of work he started the company ADT security, which still stands today. He was inducted to the National Inventors Hall of Fame in 2006 for this invention.
