= East Money =

Chinese company

East Money Information Co., Ltd
- Native name: 东方财富信息股份有限公司
- Company type: Public
- Traded as: SZSE: 300059
- Industry: Financial services, technology
- Predecessor: Shanghai Dong Cai Information Technology
- Founded: January 20, 2005; 21 years ago
- Founder: Qi Shi
- Headquarters: Shanghai, China
- Key people: Qi Shi (Chairman)
- Revenue: ▼CN¥11.08 billion (2023)
- Net income: ▼CN¥8.19 billion (2023)
- Total assets: ▲CN¥239.58 billion (2023)
- Total equity: ▲CN¥71.96 billion (2023)
- Number of employees: 5,992 (2023)
- Website: www.eastmoney.com

East Money Information (East Money; Chinese: 东方财富; pinyin: Dōngfāng Cáifù) is a Chinese financial data and software company headquartered in Shanghai. It also runs Guba, an investment chat forum.

== Background ==
In 2005, Qi Shi founded Shanghai Dong Cai Information Technology, the predecessor to East Money.

In 2009, East Money started trading on the Shenzhen Stock Exchange.

In 2015, East Money acquired brokerage Tongxin East Fortune Securities.

In 2018, East Money secured a license allowing it to manage its own mutual funds.
