= Zhang Changhong (businessman) =

- Born: 1958 or 1959 (age 67–68)
- Education: Suzhou University of Science and Technology
- Occupation: Founder of Shanghai DZH

Zhang Changhong (Chinese: 张长虹; born March 1958) is a Chinese entrepreneur and business executive, best known as the founder of Shanghai DZH, a Shanghai-based financial data and software company formerly known as Shanghai Great Wisdom (上海大智慧股份有限公司). He built DZH into one of China's leading domestic providers of real-time market data and trading software, positioned as a local competitor to international vendors such as Reuters and Bloomberg.

== Early life and education ==
Zhang was born in March 1958 in Chengdu, Sichuan. He studied at Northwestern Polytechnical University (NWPU) in Xi'an, where university records describe him as a 1984-cohort student who graduated in 1987 with a master's degree in philosophy. After completing his studies, Zhang worked as a teacher at Nanjing Aeronautical School, a predecessor institution of Nanjing University of Aeronautics and Astronautics, before moving into the securities-services industry.

== Career ==
=== Early career and securities consulting ===
By the 1990s Zhang was working in the securities-services sector as general manager of the Shanghai Pudong branch of Beijing Wanguo Enterprise Service Co. and later as chairman and general manager of Shanghai Wanguo Stock Appraisal & Consulting, a securities-consulting firm.

In the early 2000s, Zhang put forward a "full circulation" (全流通) plan to resolve the split-share structure, proposing mechanisms under which non-tradable state and corporate shares could gradually obtain trading rights while protecting the market value of existing tradable shares.

Zhang is chairman of DZH, which competes in China with Reuters and Bloomberg.

=== Founding of Shanghai DZH ===
In December 2000 Zhang and partners founded Shanghai DZH Investment Consulting Co. Ltd., the predecessor of Shanghai Great Wisdom Network Technology Co. Ltd. with Zhang as legal representative and principal shareholder. The company initially focused on providing stock-market quotation and analysis software for retail investors through internet-connected terminals and gradually expanded into a broader range of financial data, analytics and trading tools.

Shanghai Great Wisdom (later renamed Shanghai DZH) obtained regulatory approval to list on the Shanghai Stock Exchange and completed its initial public offering in 2011.

=== Regulatory penalties and legal issues ===
On 20 July 2016, the CSRC published an administrative penalty decision concluding that DZH's 2013 annual report contained false information, including inflated revenue and profit figures and misclassified costs, and that the company had overstated its 2013 profit by more than 120 million yuan through practices such as promising customers full refunds on high-priced software packages while recognising the revenue up front, mis-labelling client funds raised for "new share" subscriptions as software sales, booking advertising-contract income prematurely, and deferring recognition of large year-end bonuses.

== Personal life ==
He is married and lives in Shanghai, China.
