= Wind Information =

Chinese financial data company

Wind Information Co., Ltd.
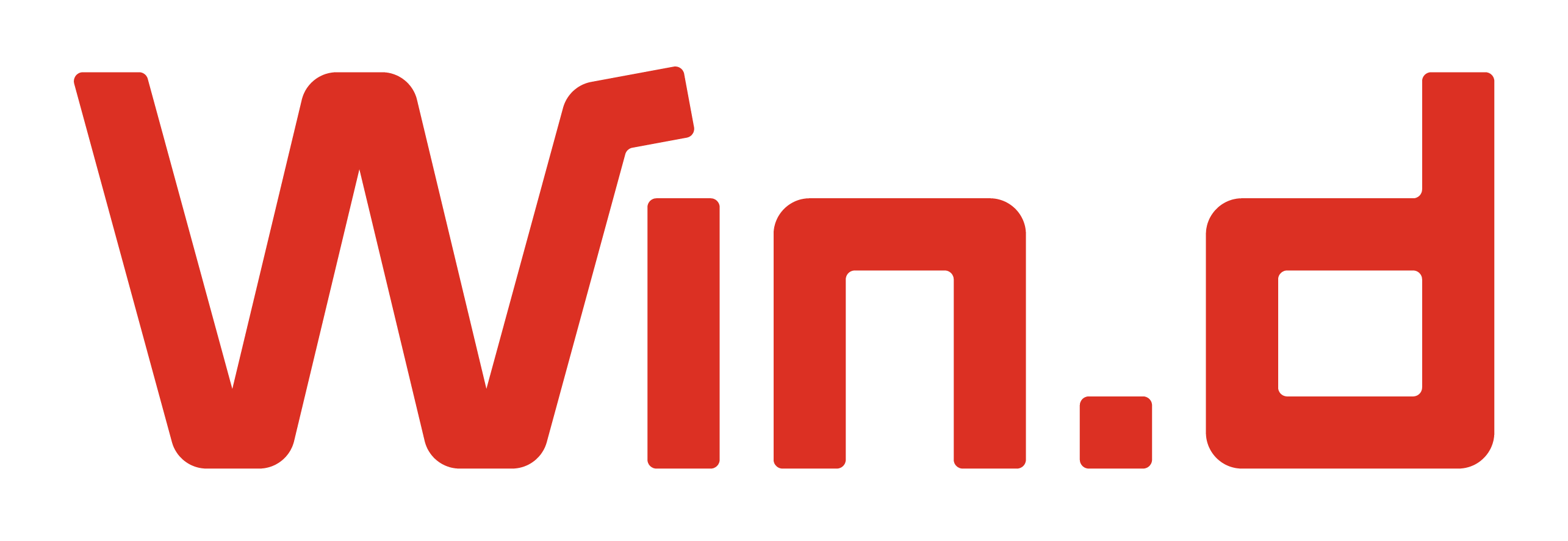
- Native name: 万得信息技术股份有限公司
- Type: Private
- Industry: Financial services Technology
- Founded: 1998; 28 years ago
- Founder: Lu Feng
- Headquarters: Shanghai IFC, Shanghai, China
- Key people: Lu Feng (Chairman)
- Products: Wind Financial Terminal
- Website: www.wind.com.cn

Wind (Wind Information; Chinese: 万得信息; pinyin: Wàndé Xìnxī) is a Chinese financial data and software company headquartered in Shanghai.

The company produces the Wind Financial Terminal which is considered the largest Chinese domestic alternative to the Bloomberg Terminal.

Outside China, Wind has offices in New York, London and Hong Kong.

== Background ==
In 1998, Wind was founded by Lu Feng.

In 2012 Wind sued Hithink RoyalFlush Information Network, a rival company. In its lawsuit, Wind stated that the iFinD terminal infringed on its intellectual property rights. In 2016, the Shanghai No. 1 Intermediate Court ruled in favour of Wind stating Hithink had to cease operating the iFinD terminal and pay 3.35 million yuan to Wind in compensation. In December 2017, the Shanghai High People's Court upheld the ruling but did not say whether Hithink could continue operating the iFinD terminal (which according to Hithink has been modified significantly since the lawsuit started).

In March 2019, Li Qiang visited Wind's office and gave encouragement to the firm's employees, telling them to hold themselves to international standards.

On 15 March 2023, Wind temporarily stopped providing real-time bond pricing services for users after it was ordered by regulators to stop revealing bond prices. However two days later the ban was reversed and Wind resumed its real-time bond pricing services.

In May 2023, it was reported that Wind started to limit overseas users’ access to some information on its systems. Users in Hong Kong and other cities outside mainland China were cut off from data on online retail shopping trends, satellite images showing the lighting of different cities and accessing land-auction records. Overseas users either got a message saying the information was unavailable or were required to fill in a form declaring why they want to access the data and pledging that it is for personal use only. Wind responded by stating that such changes were in line with standard practices of its global peers.

On 8 January 2024, Wind suffered from a technical malfunction that denied access to most of its users during trading hours.

== See also ==
- Bloomberg Terminal
- Financial data vendor
- Hithink RoyalFlush Information Network
- RatingDog
