= Zero2IPO =

Chinese financial company

Zero2IPO Holdings Inc.
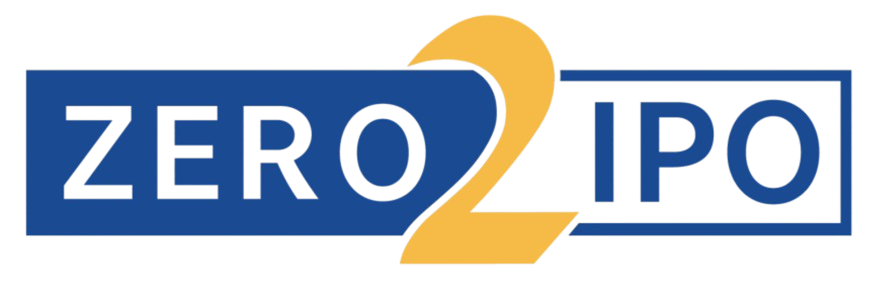
- Native name: 清科创业控股有限公司
- Company type: Public
- Traded as: SEHK: 1945
- Industry: Financial services
- Founded: 2000; 26 years ago
- Founder: Gavin Ni
- Headquarters: Beijing, China
- Key people: Gavin Ni (CEO)
- Revenue: ▲CN¥238.46 million (2023)
- Net income: ▼CN¥16.34 million (2023)
- Total assets: ▼CN¥739.45 million (2023)
- Total equity: ▲CN¥567.75 million (2023)
- Number of employees: 306 (2023)
- Website: www.zero2ipo.com.cn

Zero2IPO (Chinese: 清科; pinyin: Qīng Kē) is a publicly listed Chinese media company that focuses on being a service provider to firms in the venture capital (VC) and private equity (PE) industries.

The company is known for providing data regarding China's VC/PE scene.

== Background ==
After graduating from Tsinghua University, Gavin Ni had a brief stint in journalism before moving into VC. In 2000, he founded Zero2IPO.

The company grew quickly with a growth rate of 80% per annum and by late 2004 it had a revenue of 10 million yuan. There was a preference to provide research to western VC firms and training for Chinese VC firms. At the time the firm did not have much VC investment activity.

During the COVID-19 pandemic, despite disruptions to offline events and business operations, Zero2IPO saw increased demand for its online offerings.

In June 2020, Zero2IPO applied for an initial public offering (IPO) on the Hong Kong Stock Exchange (SEHK). The proceeds would be used to expand its geographical coverage in China as well as expand its service offerings. In addition it planned to expand into other areas like Southeast Asia and India.

On 30 December 2020, Zero2IPO held its IPO to become a listed company on the SEHK. The offering was oversubscribed 1393 times.

In 2021, Zero2IPO's subsidiary in Hong Kong obtained a license from the Securities and Futures Commission to provide investment banking services. Zero2IPO assisted SenseTime in its SEHK IPO. During the same year, Zero2IPO also launched PEDATA MAX, a professional SaaS system.

In 2022, Zero2IPO and CNCB Capital formed a special-purpose acquisition company, TechStar Acquisition Corporation that was listed on the SEHK. In December 2024, it was announced that TechStar Acquisition Corporation would merge with Seyond, a provider of image-grade Lidar technology.

== Businesses ==
Zero2IPO has four major online platforms. They are:

- PEdata Database: provides industry data
- PEdaily: provides news and information
- Deal-Market: provides investor to entrepreneur matching services
- SandHill College: provides training services

The PEdata Database contained itemized information of 8,000+ VC/PE firms, 6,000+ institutional investors, 20,000+ China-focused funds, 40,000+ individual investors and 20,000+ VC/PE deals by the end of 2013. The three mains sources were regular questionnaire surveys which covered the most active China-focused investment institutions, periodic telephone surveys and other published reports.

Besides its online presence, Zero2IPO is known for organizing events to cover various topics related to the VC/PE industries. They are primarily local government agencies and investors.

== See also ==
- Financial data vendor
