= ProRealTime =

Technical analysis software

- Developer: IT-Finance
- Stable release: 10.3 / October 27, 2016; 9 years ago
- Written in: Java
- Operating system: Windows, Mac OS X, Linux
- Type: Technical analysis software, Electronic trading platform, Algorithmic trading
- License: Proprietary software
- Website: prorealtime.com

ProRealTime is a technical analysis software designed and developed in France by IT-Finance. It consists of an electronic trading platform and a technical analysis software used to analyse financial markets.
