= Matthew Dolan =

Matthew Dolan may refer to:

- Matt Dolan (born 1965), former member of the Ohio House of Representatives
- Matthew Dolan (footballer) (born 1993), English footballer
