= Qi Shi =

Chinese businessman

- Born: October 1970 (age 56)
- Other name: Shen Jun
- Education: Shanghai Jiaotong University; Fudan University
- Occupation: Businessman
- Title: Founder and chairman, East Money Information

Qi Shi (Chinese: 其实; born October 1970), born Shen Jun (Chinese: 沈军), is a Chinese billionaire businessman, founder of East Money Information a financial and stock information website provider, with 23.6 million users a day in July 2015.

He has a bachelor's degree from Shanghai Jiaotong University and an executive MBA from Fudan University.

As of August 2020, Forbes estimated his net worth at US$7.7 billion.

He lives in Shanghai.
