= Permanent interest bearing shares =

Security issued by building societies

In finance, permanent interest bearing shares (PIBS) are fixed-interest securities issued by building societies. PIBS become perpetual subordinated bonds if their issuer demutualises. Building societies use them in the way public limited companies use preference shares. Although similar to bonds, PIBS typically exist as long as their issuer does. Many PIBS were originally issued in an era of higher interest rates, and so appear attractive to investors looking for income in a world of lower interest rates. However, there are some disadvantages to PIBS; unlike bonds they have no fixed redemption date, so the buyer is at the mercy of the markets when they want to sell. Also, PIBS are not covered by UK government compensation schemes, interest does not 'roll up' - if a payment is missed, it is gone for good - and they rank behind depositors and other members in the event of financial distress.

PIBS often have a call date at which the building society (not the investor) has the option to cancel the share and repay the face value to the holder. This may be attractive to the society if, for example, the rate being paid on PIBS is well above current market interest rates.

The Basel III rules are expected to phase out PIBS' inclusion in Tier 1 regulatory capital, meaning that building societies will be looking to replace PIBS as the opportunity arises. A replacement instrument has been created as Core Capital Deferred Shares.
