= Same-day affirmation =

Verification process used in securities trading

In securities trading, same-day affirmation (SDA) also known as T0 refers to completing the entire trade verification process on the same day that the actual trade took place, and was invented in the early '90s by James Karat, the inventor of straight-through processing, in London. Trade verification is carried out on the institutional side of the market between the investment manager and the broker/dealer. This process ensures that the parties are in agreement about the essential trade details.

The three key steps in the verification process that Karat created are:

1. Notice of execution by the broker/dealer. “CONFIRMATION”
2. Affirmation or Rejection by the client of the transaction details. “AFFIRMATION” or "REJECTION"
3. Transmission of allocation details by the investment manager (the splits). “ALLOCATION”

The trade verification process concludes when the affirmation/allocation has been completed and then the clearing and settlement process begins, which also involves custodians, central securities depositories (CSDs), and other participants in the post-trading value chain. SDA leaves more time for the clearing and settlement processes within the intended settlement period, which in most markets means on the second day after trade execution (known as "T+2").

A market where SDA is the standard is also referred to as a "trade-date environment". This is seen as a critical enabler to achieving shortened settlement cycles, an objective the European Commission is driving through its Central Securities Depositories Regulation, and about which the United States has begun discussions as well, propelled in part by research commissioned by the Depository Trust & Clearing Corporation in 2012.

== Automated trade verification ==
=== Manual trade verification—local matching ===
Under manual verification, the allocation, confirmation and affirmation procedures are conducted sequentially between the investment manager and broker/dealer. There is no involvement of any further intermediary and communication is usually via telephone, fax or email.

With manual trade the counterparties respond to each other’s messages and the relevant data needs to be checked and re-keyed manually. There is a strict sequence of steps; each party must wait for the other to complete its actions before proceeding. Only once all the steps in the trade verification process are completed will the settlement instructions be sent and the next stages of post-trade processing begin.

=== Automated trade verification—local matching ===
The verification process can be automated in full or in part. For example, where confirmation/affirmation is automated but allocation instructions are sent by fax or email. The process is locally matched and is conducted directly between the broker/dealer and the investment manager through an electronic system also known as an electronic trade confirmation ETC system, which can be either provided by third-party vendors or developed by the parties themselves.

=== Automated trade verification—central matching ===
Under central matching models, the process is fully automated and centralized using a central matching utility, which is usually provided by third-party vendors. Unlike the local matching models, where trade verification is conducted bilaterally and relies on traditional message flows in which trade information is provided in a set order, thus adding time to trade settlement, central matching allows investment managers and broker/dealers to input the data independently and separately into the centralized matching utility, where the information is then centrally validated and matched.

=== Automation of the trade verification process ===
The trade verification process can range from fully manual procedures that follow a strict sequencing of steps to full automation where trade details are centrally matched and validated and the processes do not necessarily happen sequentially.

In practice, where the investment manager is not automated, broker/dealers will often not wait for the affirmation from the investment manager before notifying their settlement agents and submitting their settlement instructions. In this case, settlement instructions are sent on the basis of trade details that have not been affirmed and thus risk being incorrect.

SDA is unlikely under manual processes because there will be time lags and delays to completion of trade verification beyond the trade date, especially for significant trade volumes and where there are resource constraints.

At the other end of the spectrum, central matching removes much of the sequentially in the trade verification process because the counterparties involved input the relevant data independently and separately. The information is then validated and matched centrally and to a large extent synchronously. When the details match, settlement instructions are automatically sent to custodians and settlement agents. What is more, the counterparties receive updates on the status of trades processed through the system, with errors (and the need to take corrective action) being indicated if trades do not match.

=== Automation as a precondition for achieving same-day affirmation ===
The verification of the trade details between investment manager and broker/dealer is a key activity along the trading and post-trade process, taking place after the trade is executed and before it can be cleared and settled. Automated trade verification (using electronic systems to match the trade details either locally or centrally) provides a means to achieve timely trade verification. Automation assists timely completion of the process for the bulk of the trades that can be sent straight through for settlement, allowing resources to be focused on those trades where manual intervention is required to rectify any errors identified. While automation does not guarantee SDA for all trades, it is a precondition for achieving high rates of SDA.

== Benefits of automated SDA process ==
=== Direct benefits ===
SDA leads to settlement efficiency: Settlement efficiency in countries with SDA rates of over 90 percent—India, Taiwan, Hong Kong, Japan, Singapore and Korea—is 26 percent higher than in countries with SDA scores of less than 70 percent—Brazil, Italy, South Africa and the United States. Automation of the trade verification process can deliver SDA through improved trade processing times and eliminate errors inherent in manual processing by removing the requirement to send information back and forth manually between broker/dealer and investment manager. This translates into benefits in the form of a reduction in operational risk and trade failure rates for a given level of operating costs, and a reduction in operating costs for a given risk and failure rate.

==== Risk reduction and improved settlement performance ====
Reduced risk through better accuracy in the trade verification process — the adoption of automated SDA processes reduces the rate at which trade fails occur and mitigates the costs associated with these fails. It does this by making it easier for the investment manager or broker/dealer to identify errors or mismatches in the trade details which, if not corrected up front, could result in the trade failing to settle on time. Furthermore, compared to manual processing, automation will reduce the likelihood of new errors being introduced during the post-trade processes.

==== Operating cost efficiencies ====
Estimates show that failed trades put as much as US$976 billion in equity transactions and $308 billion in fixed income transactions at risk annually. A reduction in the risk of trade fails implies less time spent on preventing or following up potential or actual fails. Fewer fails mean fewer costs downstream in record-keeping, reconciliations of settlement instructions, corporate actions, claims-handling and other functions required to resolve fails. Therefore, some of the operating cost efficiencies will be passed along the value chain and benefit other parties, not just the investment manager and broker/dealer.

=== Indirect benefits ===
In addition to the direct benefits of risk and cost reductions, automated SDA processes can generate indirect benefits. These relate to better management of information, increased transparency, and improved monitoring of own positions and performance as well as counterparty performance. Furthermore, it provides a key step towards achieving full straight-through processing (STP) of trades from order to settlement, with additional risk and cost reduction implications.

==== Improved information ====
If the relevant data is confirmed/affirmed and available on the trade date, records and accounts are more likely to be accurate, and valuations can be conducted in a more effective and timely manner.

==== Increased transparency and improved monitoring ====
Transparency is improved because the information on trades arrives at one point of entry and is electronically stored, which means that it can be more readily accessed and tracked than communications by email, fax or telephone.

The electronic storage of relevant trade information, including the history of a trade such as any actions taken by the counterparties to rectify unmatched trades, is likely to improve transparency in the process by leaving an audit trail. It also allows individual firms to track and measure their operational performance and trade processing efficiency such as average response times for allocations, confirmations and affirmations.

==== Enables straight-through processing (STP) ====
Automation of this part of the process provides a bridge between the front and back office, and so can be considered as one of the necessary measures to move towards straight-through processing.

=== Market-wide adoption of automated SDA processes and the wider benefits ===
The risk reductions and cost efficiencies that can be realized by an individual firm are likely to be more feasible with a market-wide move towards automation and SDA as best operational practice, because this will go further to shorten and harmonize the settlement process.

Both sides (investment managers and broker/dealers) benefit from the adoption of automation of their counterparts. For example, broker/dealers need their existing (as well as potential) clients to adopt automation in order to reorganize their activities in such a way that fully captures the benefits of automation. If some existing (or potential) clients do not adopt automation, the brokerage firm will still have to organize its operations in order to meet the requirements of its non-automated clients. At present, many investment managers and broker/dealers that have switched to an automated solution find it difficult to benefit from it fully due to the lack of automation of their counterparties. The risk reductions and cost efficiencies that can be realized at individual or bilateral level would therefore be likely to deliver greater overall benefits if more, and ideally all, firms in a given market were to adopt automated processes based on standardized or interoperable systems.

The degree to which firms in a market use automated trade verification and achieve SDA has further implications in terms of the market-wide benefits that can be realized. In fact, some potential benefits can be extracted only if there is a market-wide move towards automated SDA (at least within that market).

In some instances, automation and the move towards SDA as best operational practice delivers most benefits if it is adopted not just by most firms within a country, but across the whole relevant economic region. For example, harmonization of settlement practices between EU countries can arguably be achieved more easily in an environment where firms in individual countries have adopted more consistent and efficient verification processes.

=== Benefits for end investors ===
From a wider perspective, these benefits from reductions in the risks and costs borne by investment managers and broker/dealers (or other intermediaries), once these benefits have been realised by a significant part of the market, would be passed through and be reflected in lower prices, resulting in lower transaction costs for end investors and producing associated beneficial effects on liquidity and operation of markets.

== See also ==
- Straight-through processing
