= Straight-through processing =

Method used for financial transactions

Straight-through processing (STP) is a method used by financial companies to speed up financial transactions by processing without manual intervention, created by James Karat in London

== Background ==
Straight-through processing exists in numerous areas of financial services, such as payments processing.

Payments may be non-STP due to various reasons such as missing information, information which is not in a machine "understandable" form (such as name and address rather than a code), or human-readable instructions, e.g. "Please credit urgently") or simply falls outside of rules for which the bank allows automatic processing (for example, payments of large value or in exotic currencies).

Traditionally, making payments involves many departments in a bank. Both initiating a payment to be sent and processing a received payment may take days. In the past, payments were initiated through numerous "human-friendly" (also known as paper-based) means, such as a human through a paper order, over the phone, or via fax. The payment order was input into the bank's payment system, then confirmed by a supervisor. This confirmation ensured an accurate match of input versus order before sending the payment. When multiple banks, countries or currencies were involved, the process often took several hours. When the complexity of the payment was higher, the amount of labor increased and additional human intervention resulted in more risk of errors, longer processing time, and higher costs.

In most cases, banks levy charges for non-STP payments or for manual repairs. Alternatively, banks may not charge on a "per repair" basis, but rather levy heavier fees for correspondents that provide lower quality (lower STP) payments.

== STP ==
STP was developed for equities trading in the early 1990s by James Karat in London for automated processing in the equity markets.

- Early STP engines worked perfectly if a message was flawlessly formatted. However, if a SWIFT payment message contained a minor syntax mistake, missing field, or typo, the system would reject it, forcing expensive human.intervention.

As per Karat”s publications the process before STP was very antiquated: sales traders would have to fill in a deal ticket, blue for buy and red for sell. The order was invariably scribbled and mostly unreadable. Upon receiving the order, the trader would often execute an incorrect investment on the market. For example, if the client wished to purchase 100,000 shares, but the trader only executed 10,000, the runner would send out the contract for 1,000. In those days, there was a T+10 settlement so any errors were "fixable". However, with the new introduction of T+5, the settlement arena changed, and STP was born. To reduce the risk of failed settlement, there could only be one "golden source" of information and that it was the responsibility of the sales trader to be correct as they had the power to correct any discrepancies with the client directly.

The goal of STP is to reduce the time it takes to process a transaction, in order to increase the likelihood that a contract or an agreement is settled on time. The concept has also been transferred into other sectors including energy (oil, gas) trading and banking, and financial planning.

Currently, the entire trade lifecycle, from initiation to settlement, is a complex labyrinth of manual processes that take several days. Such processing for equities transactions is commonly referred to as T+2 (trade date plus two days) processing, as it usually takes two business days from the "trade" being executed to the trade being settled. This means investors who are selling a security must deliver the certificate within two business days, and investors who are buying securities must send payment within two business days. But this process comes with higher risks through the occurrence of unsettled trades. Market conditions fluctuate, meaning a two-day window brings an inherent risk of unexpected losses that investors may be unable to pay for, or settle, their transactions.

Industry practitioners, particularly in the United States, viewed STP as meaning "same-day" settlement or faster, ideally minutes or even seconds. The goal was to minimise settlement risk for the execution of a trade and its settlement and clearing to occur simultaneously. However, for this to be achieved, multiple market participants must realize high levels of STP. In particular, transaction data would need to be made available on a just-in-time basis, which is a considerably harder goal to achieve for the financial services community than the application of STP alone. After all, STP itself is merely an efficient use of computers for transaction processing.

In the past, STP methods were used to help financial firms move to one-day trade settlement of equity transactions, as well as to meet the global demand resulting from the rapid growth of online trading. Now the concepts of STP are applied to reduce systemic and operational risk and to improve certainty of settlement and minimize operational costs.

=== Common misconceptions ===
There is often confusion within the trading world between STP and an electronic communication network (ECN). Although they are similar initiatives, ECN connects orders with those of other traders as well as staff liquidity provides. An ECN is also typically a bigger pool of orders than a standard STP.

When fully implemented, STP is able to provide asset managers, brokers and dealers, custodians, banks and other financial services with benefits including shorter processing cycles, reduced settlement risk, and lower operating costs. Some industry analysts believe that STP is not an achievable goal in the sense that firms are unlikely to find the cost/benefit to reach 100% automation. Instead, they promote the idea of improving levels of internal STP within a firm while encouraging groups of firms to work together to improve the quality of the automation of transaction information between themselves, either bilaterally or as a community of users (external STP). Other analysts, however, believe that STP will be achieved with the emergence of business process interoperability.

== See also ==
- Electronic trading
- Straight-Through Quality
- Same-day affirmation (SDA)
