= Hithink RoyalFlush Information Network =

Chinese financial data company

Hithink RoyalFlush Information Network Co., Ltd.
- Trade name: Tonghuashun
- Native name: 浙江核新同花顺网络信息股份有限公司
- Formerly: Shanghai Hexin
- Company type: Public
- Traded as: SZSE: 300033; CSI Midcap 200
- Industry: Financial services Technology
- Founded: 24 August 2001; 24 years ago
- Founder: Yi Zheng
- Headquarters: Hangzhou, Zhejiang, China
- Key people: Yi Zheng (Chairman & CEO)
- Products: Tonghuashu iFinD
- Revenue: ▲CN¥3.56 billion (2023)
- Net income: ▼CN¥1.40 billion (2023)
- Total assets: ▲CN¥9.85 billion (2023)
- Total equity: ▲CN¥7.32 billion (2023)
- Number of employees: 5,492 (2023)
- Website: www.10jqka.com.cn

Hithink RoyalFlush Information Network (Hithink; Chinese: 同花顺; pinyin: Tónghuāshùn) is a Chinese financial data and software company headquartered in Hangzhou.

The company has developed the Tonghuashun mobile app used for stock trading and the iFinD Financial Data Terminal.

== Background ==
In 1994, Zhejiang University graduate Yi Zheng co-founded his own company, Hangzhou Hexin. Yi acquired the initial capital by writing security analysis software for a securities brokerage he was still an electrical engineering student. In 2001 he founded Shanghai Hexin which was the predecessor to Hithink.

In 2007 Shanghai Hexin acquired Hangzhou Hexin and in July it moved to Hangzhou where it was rebranded to Hithink.

In 2009, Hithink held its initial public offering becoming a listed company on the ChiNext section of the Shenzhen Stock Exchange.

In 2012, Wind Information sued Hithink stating the iFinD Data Terminal infringed on its intellectual property rights. In 2016, the Shanghai No. 1 Intermediate Court ruled in favour of Wind Information stating Hithink had to cease operating the iFinD terminal and pay 3.35 million yuan to Wind in compensation. In 2017, the Shanghai High People's Court upheld the ruling but did not say whether Hithink could continue operating the iFinD Data Terminal (which according to Hithink has been modified significantly since the lawsuit started).

In 2015, the China Securities Regulatory Commission (CSRC) fined Hithink for developing systems that enabled investors to trade stocks without giving their real identities which allowed it to profit by "knowingly" providing the software to unqualified clients. In 2017, the CSRC fined Hithink 200,000 yuan for sharing a piece of outdated news that stated Fosun International’s founder Guo Guangchang was missing which caused panic among its shareholders.

In October 2021, Hithink's Tinghuashun app went down for one hour. The temporary disruption caused investors losses and leading them to seek compensation. The regulators issued a warning to Hithink. In June 2022, the Tinghuashun app went down for a short period due to Huawei Cloud crashing.

In November 2024, the CSRC ordered Hithink to suspend its investment advisory service unit from adding new clients for three months as its live streaming business failed to comply with the securities rules. It also criticized its compliance control when collaborating with securities companies to provide investment consulting services.

In December 2024, Bloomberg News reported that Hithink significantly benefited from China's stimulus blitz program in September that year. Hithink shares had more than doubled in price during 2024. One of the reasons speculated was the stimulus resulted in higher stock trading volume that could boost demand for better financial information from retail investors.

== See also ==
- Financial data vendor
- Wind Information
