= Members Exchange =

Stock exchange

The Members Exchange (MEMX)
- Type: Stock exchange and Options exchange
- Location: New York City, United States
- Founded: 2019; 7 years ago
- Owner: Consortium of nine banks, financial services firms, market makers, and retail broker-dealers
- Key people: Jonathan Kellner (Chief Executive Officer)
- Currency: United States Dollar (USD)
- Commodities: US Stocks and Options
- Website: memx.com

The Members Exchange (MEMX) is an American technology-driven stock exchange founded by its members to serve the interest of its founders and their collective client base. The founding members, which include nine major financial organizations, claim they seek to transform markets around the goals of transparency, innovation, and competition in order to align exchange services with the interests of market participants. It is a member-formed equities trading platform, and competes with the major equity exchanges: NYSE, Nasdaq, and CBOE.

The mission of the exchange is "to increase competition, improve operational transparency, reduce fixed costs and simplify the execution of equity trading in the U.S." Initially, after launch, MEMX is not charging for market data or connectivity.

== History ==
MEMX was founded in early 2019 by a group of nine banks, financial services firms, market makers, and retail broker-dealers: BofA Securities, Charles Schwab Corporation, Citadel LLC, E-Trade, Fidelity Investments, Morgan Stanley, TD Ameritrade, UBS, and Virtu Financial. MEMX has also received investments from nine other financial services firms since its conception, including BlackRock, Citigroup, J.P. Morgan, Goldman Sachs, Wells Fargo, and Jane Street Capital. MEMX was founded to deliver a lower cost, more transparent exchange platform that has the end-user in mind.

MEMX received approval from the Securities and Exchange Commission in May 2020 to operate as a national securities exchange. The exchange launched on September 21, 2020, listing seven symbols and rolling out additional names through October 2020.

On September 27, 2023, MEMX launched its first U.S. options exchange, MEMX Options.

In February 2024, Blue Ocean Technologies migrated its trading system to a platform provided by MEMX.

== Key people ==
- Jonathan Kellner, Chief Executive Officer
- Dominick Paniscotti, Chief Technology Officer
- Colin Clark, Head of Business Development
- Lindsay Stone Gilliam, Chief People Officer
- Nick Ciarleglio, Head of Member Experience
- Sophie Sohn, Head of Marketing and Communications
- Ishaan Acharya, Chief Financial Officer
