= Financial quote =

Last price at which a security traded

A financial quotation refers to specific market data relating to a security or commodity. While the term quote specifically refers to the bid price or ask price of an instrument, it may be more generically used to relate to the last price which this security traded at ("last sale"). This may refer to both exchange-traded and over-the-counter financial instruments.

== Bid and ask ==
The bid price (also known as the buy price) and the ask price (also known as the sell price) of a security are the prices (and often quantities) at which buyers and sellers are willing to purchase or sell that security. The bid shows the current price at which a buyer is willing to purchase shares, while the ask shows the current price at which they are willing to sell. The quantities at which these trades are placed are referred to as "bid size" and "ask size". For instance, if a trader submits a limit order to buy 1,000 shares of MSFT at $28.00, this order will appear in a market maker for MSFT's book with a bid of $28.00 and a bid size of 1000. The difference between the bid and ask price is known as the bid–ask spread.

== Equities ==
=== Level 1 Access ===
Level 1 quotations represent realtime bid/ask data, the most commonly displayed market data. Level 1 data typically will display the Best-Bid-Offer ("BBO" or "Inside Quote"), i.e. the lowest ask and highest bid available at the time.

=== Level 2 Access ===
Level 2 data displays the best bid and ask prices (also known as "top-of-book") for each market participant in a given security. In other words, at a given time there may be several market makers participating in trade matching for a specific stock. Level 2 data will display the highest bid and lowest ask for each individual market maker.

Level 2 information is of interest to traders and brokers because it indicates the buying and selling pressure behind individual securities.

Similar in format to live streaming share prices, a typical Level 2 screen is split in two vertical halves and will show orders on both the bid price of a security (left-hand side) and the offer price (right-hand side).

On major, heavily traded stocks the "depth" of the orders can quite often be in excess of 20/30 orders to both buy and sell at lower (left) and higher (right) prices.

Traders can use this information to predict the short-term movement of a share or security in conjunction with volume traded, and attempt to profit from this information, which is usually legal as the information is in the public domain. The reason for this is that market makers sit “behind” such a screen by being obliged to both buy and sell the share at the posted price up to what is known as normal market size.

For certain market centers such as NASDAQ, a full depth-of-book (DOB) is available, whereby every quotation for every market participant is displayed.

=== UK Level 2 ===
The stock exchange electronic trading system (SETS) is an electronic order-driven system for trading the UK bluechip stocks, including FTSE 100 and FTSEurofirst 300 stocks. The SETS order book matches buy and sell orders on a price/time priority. On SEAQ, all buys and sells go through a market maker who acts as an intermediary.

The basis of SETS is that it directly matches willing buyers and sellers, creating efficiency in the markets by doing away with the intermediary of the market maker. This efficiency is true while the SETS system is populated by the most liquid and heavily traded stocks, but if matched bargains operate on less liquid stocks, waiting for a buyer to match with a seller could take hours, days or weeks. Because of the efficiency of the SETS system, stocks traded tend to have narrow spreads so the cost of entry and exit from a position is much smaller.

== See also ==
- Market data
- Stock exchange
