= George May Phelps =

American inventor (1820–1888)

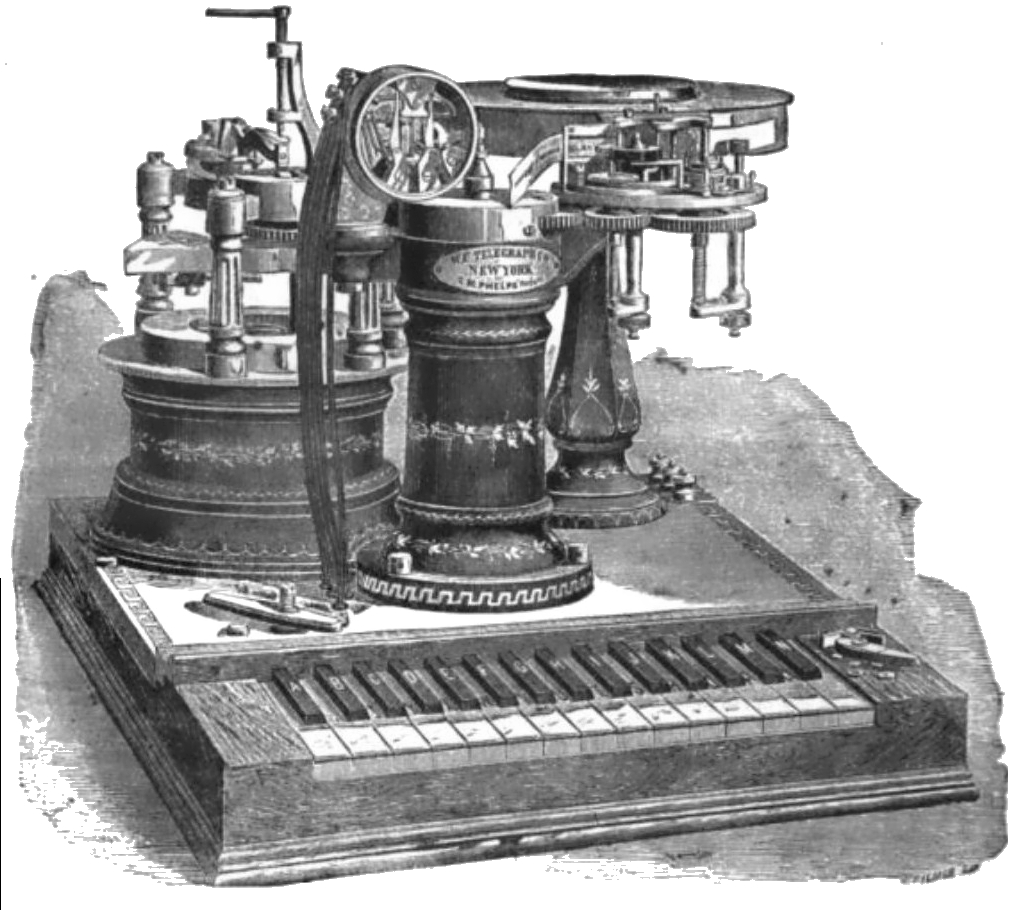
- Phelps' Electro-motor Printing Telegraph from c. 1880, the last and most advanced telegraphy mechanism designed by George May Phelps
- Born: March 19, 1820; Watervliet, New York, U.S.
- Died: May 18, 1888 (aged 68); Brooklyn, New York, U.S.
- Occupation: Inventor

George May Phelps (March 19, 1820 – May 18, 1888) was a 19th-century American inventor of automated telegraphy equipment. He is credited with synthesizing the designs of several existing printers into his line of devices which became the dominant apparatus for automated reception and transmission of telegraph messages.

== Biography ==
George May Phelps was born in Watervliet, New York, in 1820. As a youth, he went to work for his uncle Jonas H. Phelps, who made mathematical instruments in Troy, New York.

During the 1850s, the Morse system of telegraphy was in competition with the Bain chemical system and the House printing system. Phelps' first business endeavor appears to be as Phelps and Dickerman in Troy, New York, building the House printing telegraph instruments. By this time his machinist skills had expanded into areas involving work in light machinery, paper sorting machines, and safe locks. Some of his earliest patents were designs on speed governors.

== Printing telegraph ==
In 1855, David E. Hughes, a music professor, designed a new printing telegraph system. The Hughes system was purchased by the newly formed American Telegraph Company, a Western Union competitor, and given to Phelps for refinement. Phelps made two important changes to the printer. He invented a device to re-synchronize both the transmitting and receiving printer after the completion of each character. He also combined both drive mechanisms together to increase the number of characters reaching the platen in the shortest possible time. These improvements made the Hughes printer design viable for commercial use.

== Further career ==
In 1856, the recently organized American Telegraph Company purchased the Phelps and Dickerman shops and made Phelps plant superintendent of its most significant manufacturing operation. Western Union purchased American Telegraph Company following the Civil War in 1866 and positioned Phelps as superintendent of the mechanical department, first in Troy, later in Williamsburg and finally in New York City.

Phelps continued to work on printing telegraph systems for many years with full support from Western Union management, who sought any competitive advantage. In the mid-1870s, Western Union's president William Orton assigned Phelps to experiment with the harmonic telegraph in hopes of extended it to a working telephone.

He tried to improve the construction of telephones.

In August 1886 he helped Mr. Franklin Leonard Pope to conduct "The Electrician", and "Electrical Engineer". He acquired an interest in that journal.

George Phelps was a charter member of the American Institute of Electrical Engineers, and was elected one of its managers on May 19, 1885. At first, he served on the council, and he became a treasurer on May 17, 1887.
