= Henry Alonzo House =

American inventor (1840–1930)

Henry Alonzo House (April 23, 1840 – December 18, 1930) was an American inventor who developed machinery and processes that have had a lasting impact on several industries.

== Early life ==
House was born in Brooklyn, New York, the youngest son of Ezekiel House, an architect and builder, and Susannah King. His father was an architect and builder, and at that time was assisting his brother Royal Earl House in perfecting and getting capital interest in his new Printing Telegraph.

In the spring of 1846 the House family moved to Little Meadows, Susquehanna County, Pennsylvania, where they built a home on the side of a hill which was known as the Castle. There was a natural spring nearby, which was piped into the house to give running water, an unusual thing for those days. At that time there was no railroad to that part of the country, so in order to move their household goods from New York, they boarded a barge which was towed by steam up the Hudson River to Troy where it was taken through the lock into the Erie Canal and towed by horses to Ithaca on Lake Cayuga, New York. The last part of the trip was made by ox teams and the whole journey took over a month.

In 1852 the family moved to Owego, New York, where there were better educational facilities. Here they lived by the Susquehanna River. The boys James and Henry built a boat and rigged it up like the side wheelers they had seen on the Hudson River. This they used to take people up the river on excursions and also to carry produce down the river, thus earning money with which to pay their father for the material used to build the boat.

== Inventing years ==
Ezekiel House left Owego in the spring of 1854 as he had taken a contract to build a county court house in the suburbs of Rockford, Illinois. Henry and his brother went to Rockford in the fall and started in business with their father. In 1857 Henry took a position with his father who was superintending the raising and reconstructing of the old city hall in Chicago. While working on a building in New York, Henry had the misfortune of having the extension muscle of his right hand severed by a chisel which dropped from a scaffold. This incapacitated his doing any carpentry work for several months. During this enforced idleness, he designed and patented an automatic gate.

=== Automatic buttonhole machine ===
When the Civil War broke out and Henry was rejected as a volunteer on account of his slightly crippled right hand, he turned his attention to making a button hole machine. He and his brother James entered into partnership with Mr. Seaman and in 1862 they perfected an automatic buttonhole sewing machine. It was then tested in a clothing shop in New York on army overcoats and capes, where its average was from 1,000 to 1,200 buttonholes per day. This caused hard feelings among the hand buttonhole workers, and one day during the noon hour they smashed the machine. However, the next morning another machine was working in its place. All together there were over one hundred thousand button holes made there. The patents were taken over by the Wheeler and Wilson Manufacturing Company of Bridgeport, Connecticut. While House was in Washington, D.C., looking after the patent application, he met Abraham Lincoln, for whom he cast his first vote.

In November 1862, he again returned to Little Meadows and married his cousin Mary Elizabeth House, daughter of William House, a miller. As his mother was very ill they hurried to Brooklyn where his mother died on November 28, 1862.

He then took his bride to Bridgeport, Connecticut, where he was engaged by Wheeler and Wilson to superintend the making of his buttonhole machine. In the Spring of 1863 his father Ezekiel House died in Brooklyn. During that year four patents were issued for the automatic buttonhole sewing machine. In 1867 House represented the company at the Paris Exposition Universelle, which opened in France in May 1867.

=== Another sewing machine patent ===
In 1864 his shop was moved from Brooklyn to Bridgeport, with his brother James joining him there. They soon perfected an attachment to be used on the family sewing machine. This system was entirely new and since the patent was issued in 1868, it has been adopted throughout the world. On February 27, 1865, Henry Alonzo House Jr. was born. Another son, William Ezekiel, was born on February 22, 1874. On November 21, 1875, a daughter, Libbie Grace, was born.

=== Steam horseless carriage ===
In the spring of 1866, Henry House, Sr. and his brother James built a steam carriage for their own amusement and recreation. It carried seven, including the driver and the fireman on the back seat. It developed 15 hp and could travel 30 mph on a good level road. It frightened so many horses and even men, so they did not use it long.

=== Knitting machine ===
House left Wheeler and Wilson in 1869 and turned his attention to developing a machine that could knit various-sized goods, both flat and tubular. At the time, there were no machines on the market doing that type of work. In 1870, the Armstrong and House Manufacturing Company was organized and a shop was built to produce the new knitting machines. Five patents were issued to House from 1869 to 1872, among them was one for a new system of knitting stockings in a continuous tube. The process would first knit the leg, then form a mitered heal, then the foot and mitered toe then a leg, and so on. The toe was then separated from the leg by drawing a thread leaving all the loops ready to close.

=== Other inventions ===
House resigned from Armstrong and House in the fall of 1872, and proceeded to invent a bundling machine for kindling wood in 1873.

In 1875 his attention was called to the dressing of fur skins, such as buffalo hides. Using existing processes, it took from two to two and a half days of hard labor to bring a large hide down to a flexible state. When House claimed that he could make a machine that could dress four hides or more a day, they were astonished, as they claimed no tool could stand up to those dry hides for even ten minutes. To meet the challenge, House developed a rotary plane with a ring knife that could be fed as it moved, with a set of small emery wheels each side of the knife so that it was sharpened on every revolution. The plane was universally hung and counterbalanced so it weighed nothing in the hand of the operator, though it was driven by power from the engine. On a wager, the first operator finished fifty hides in ten hours.

=== Paper dishes ===
In 1878, the president of the Union Paper Bag Co. of Philadelphia called on House, as he had heard that House had developed a machine that was able to make satchel-bottom paper bags. House came up with a folding attachment for their old machines, and although this was satisfactory to a degree, the machines were still old, and were not properly constructed. House then designed new machines.

While working the attachment in Philadelphia, House was asked if he could help one of Union's western branches in making the paper dishes, as they had trouble in drying them. When House produced samples with a round flange, the design was accepted and he was given a contract to build a machine that would make twenty thousand paper dishes in 10 hours. Much work was required to maintain the heat at 800 to 900 degrees, which was necessary to dry a dish in two (2) seconds. Mr. House involved a system of using superheated steam which kept the dies at red heat. The press was first tested at his factory in Bridgeport before being shipped to Clinton, Iowa.

=== Hat manufacturing ===
Late in 1878, in collaboration with hatter Dwight Wheeler, House invented and patented a machine for blocking felt hats in 28 seconds. The patents were issued on February 25, 1879, and in the same year the House and Wheeler Hat Flanging Co., a joint stock company, was formed in Bridgeport. A practical machine was built and installed at the Marrinet Hat Co. at Salisbury, Connecticut. The employees, adverse to any innovations that might reduce their value to the company, went on strike. The hat flanging machine fulfilled all requirements, and after the machine had been working a few months the strikers were ready to compromise. In later years the Hatters Union voted against its use entirely.

=== Fur work ===
In 1880, S.D. Castle and Henry House became interested in the picking of furs. Buffalo hides were getting scarce, and Castle wanted to use muskrat or beaver, but he found the pelts had to be picked of the outer long hair, a tedious job for an unskilled hand. After a few months, House had a small machine working that would pick large or small pelts without missing a hair. The machine-picked skins were shown to furriers in New York. A few days later, a Mr. Frasure of Wall Street, New York, called on House at Bridgeport, and the two reached an agreement for House to develop a machine that would pick a bull pelt six feet long and three feet wide, while being kept moist and warm. This patent, also the first of its kind, for treating pelts, was issued on October 19, 1882, just one month and five days after the application was made.

Work on the large machine for the London Co. was finished in the spring of 1882. The pelts, after being moistened, went around on a drum which was kept warm with the circulation of hot water. Frasure was more than satisfied and was anxious to ship it to London, England. as soon as possible. Passage for House was booked on the S.S. Adriatic of the White Star Line for the middle of June.

Several weeks of delays after his arrival, the demonstration was performed in secret one Saturday afternoon. In three hours, more work was accomplished than one skilled workman could do in two days. The London Co. bought all the patents pertaining to fur picking and treating of pelts. Everything was boxed and shipped to London in 30 days. Ironically, these machines were never unpacked, leaving the entire control of the fur picking trade with the English market.

=== Paper boxes ===
In 1883, House organized the Compressed Paper Box Co. and proceeded to make seamless paper boxes. He invented a new form of box termed "a round square", particularly adapted for holding cartrages, as the corners were compressed in, not out, giving extra strength. The machines built to make the boxes were semi-automatic.

At this time his son Henry (Harry) Alonzo House, Jr. joined him in his experimental work.

=== Metal polishing ===
The Deoxidized Metal Co. of Bridgeport in 1885 secured a contract for the bronze balusters required for the Treasury building in Washington, D.C. These balusters were an elaborate design incorporating leaves, beads and moulding, all intended to have a bright finish, which required a great deal of hand work. Deoxidized could make, but not burnish, the balusters and sought to subcontract this work, but no one took them up on their offer. At that time there was no machinery for polishing metals, the usual procedure was to immerse in acid, and hand work was too costly. The contract from Washington definitely stated that acid was not to be used.

The president of Deoxidized contacted House, "the man who had done so many queer things" to see if he could devise a way to perform the polishing. House submitted samples which were sent to Washington and accepted. He used a small cabinet, twice the length of the baluster, in which the baluster was slipped on a shaft and fine, high-velocity sand was shot at the baluster, thus polishing all surfaces, both concave and convex.

=== Telegraphs and telephones ===
In 1885, Henry House Sr. became stockholder in the Postal Telegraph Co. of Binghamton, New York, and was made superintendent of their experimental department. During his research, House came across a patent (U.S. patent 77,882) taken out by his uncle, Royal E. House, in 1866 for a device called the Electric Phonetic Telegraph which for transmitted messages by sound, signals and letters. This invention embodied the fundamental principle of the electric telephone.

Its construction was that of a triple-sized modern telephone. The hollow ear piece was made in such a form to focus the sound waves direct to the operator's ear. A thin metal diaphragm was secured to the opposite end, a pair of magnets with a pivoted armature was secured to the frame of the armature, and connected with the diaphragm by means of a strut, thus keeping the armature from contracting poles of the magnets, which were energized by a battery current. When the current was closed, the armature held the diaphragm in magnetic suspension. The slightest change in the current manifested upon the diaphragm and upon all those on the same line. It was decided best to move everything in connection with developing and manufacturing this project to House's shop in Bridgeport, also taking Royal House (who was then over 70 years old) and his wife with them.

In due time the instruments were perfected, adjusted to all conditions and ready to manufacture, but some misunderstandings with the directors and stock holders of the company in Binghamton resulted in a lawsuit, which stagnated in the court process until the patents expired.

In 1886–87 when the Royal E. House Telegraph was produced with the printing telegraph, the Morse Telegraph tried to enjoin them from infringing the Morse patents. Morse claimed the sole right of transmitting intelligence by electricity (which utilized the Morse code). The courts decided the House Company did not infringe the Morse patent in the slightest degree, as the messages using the House system were all printed on a slip of paper, while the Morse signals were embossed and in code (dots and dashes) which afterwards were translated into words.

As soon as Henry House procured a copy of the phonetic telegraph patent, he saw it contained all the elements and requirements of the speaking telephone, and he proceeded to make a set of instruments, which he patented on Dec 14, 1896, as the Electric Phonetic Telegraph Sender. This patent shows the exact combination and principle of the original Royal E. House patents of May 12, 1866, years before the Bell patents were issued.

Henry House's invention consisted of the use of direct current, whereas the Bell Company at that time was using alternating current House demonstrated to his attorneys that he employed a different current from the Bell system and also explained that the Bell patent was on a discovery, and not an instrument.

About this time the Royal E. House Company and the Morse Company merged and formed the Great Western Company.

In the meantime Henry House invented and produced the first liquid door check. This was a basic patent taken out by House and his son, H.A. House Jr. in 1887. The devices were later manufactured by the Pittsburg Co. under a license.

In 1888, Mr. House entered the wood-bundling business using the machines he had patented in 1873.

=== The flying machine ===
Following a disastrous fire in March 1889, which partly destroyed his factory, Henry House Sr. accepted a position with Hiram Maxim in England to construct a 300 horsepower flying machine at Bexley, Kent. In November, his son Henry House Jr. joined him to assist in this work. During this time, many patents were issued to House Sr. and assigned to the Maxim Syndicate. P.T. Barnum, a friend of House took his famous circus to England in 1889 and called on the Maxim Syndicate, expressing interest in investing in the flying machine project, but Maxim objected.

After several tests of the Maxim flying machine, the project was abandoned.

=== Boats ===
In the spring of 1891, House left the Maxim Syndicate and started a factory, at Teddington on the River Thames, to build fast motor launches using kerosene oil as fuel. During the trials of the first launch, the Doil, its speed caused a wake to wash up on banks of the river. For this Henry House was summoned to appear in court and fined 10 pounds and costs. One of the witnesses for the Crown swore the craft was going 26 knots an hour, testimony which proved to be a good advertisement.

After the court trial in 1893, it was decided to move the works to East Cowes, on the Isle of Wight, where they formed the Liquid Fuel Engineering Co. (LIFU) trademark. This company built high-speed launches for the Duke of St. Albans, Prince of Wales, the German Emperor, King of Belgium, Sir Thomas Lipton, and many other notables. This system used high pressure copper tubular boilers, burning kerosene oil, compound steam engines and specially designed propellers.

In 1894, Henry House left his son in charge and returned to America and at Bridgeport, perfected the larger sizes of his kerosene burners. Ten sizes were developed, ranging from 1/2 HP to 100 HP.

House returned to the Isle of Wight in the spring of 1896 with new patents for the burners, which were assigned to LIFU Co. The company built for House Sr. a high speed, 40 foot, 35 HP launch which he brought to America in August 1896. He expected to use this launch for demonstrating his system in forming Liquid Fuel Engineering Company in America, but on account of the death of his English associate, Sir Robert Simons, he gave up the launch business.

=== Miscellaneous inventions ===
From 1898 to 1904, House worked on horseless vehicles and patented many devices used on the early motor cars. In 1904, he went to Worcester, Massachusetts to develop a chain for the Baldwin Chain Company, and while there he also patented a Liquid Indicator and Air Pressure and vacuity indicator. In Bridgeport (1906–07), he developed and patented an all-steel barrel and keg. In 1908, he was again associated with his son Harry House Jr., who had returned from England, in developing a metal belt.

In 1909, through George Mortson of Hartford, with whom had been associated on the Maxim Flying Machine, House became interested developing a paraffinized drinking cup. This led the two men to form the U.S. Paper Bottle Co.

=== Shredded wheat ===
In 1915 Mr. Henry House became associated with the Shredded Wheat Company at Niagara Falls, New York. He constructed an entirely new system for baking, handling and packing shredded wheat biscuits. The first machine was built in his shop in Bridgeport and was accepted by the Shredded Wheat Co. and shipped to Niagara Falls. The further development of the system was turned over to Earl Webster, who had been associated with House from the beginning of the project.

It was at this time, while travelling to Niagara Falls and Rochester, that Mary House became seriously ill and died at the home of their niece, at Forest Lawn, near Rochester.

Several years later, the Shredded Wheat Co. erected a new factory at Niagara Falls, Canada, to house the new automatic oven which was a part of the House system. This oven could produce 456,000 biscuits every 24 hours.

From 1929 House, who was then 89 year sold, spent his declining years perfecting his metal barrel and flexible stick metal belt.

In all, House estimated that he had obtained over 300 patents, including those taken out in foreign countries, and although he developed thirteen basic patents, he felt that the baking process for shredded wheat biscuits to be his greatest achievement.

Henry A. House died, aged 90, on December 18, 1930, being survived by his son Henry A. House, Jr., and two daughters, Mrs. John Binkley and Mrs. George Mortson.

== Patents ==
- U.S. patent 233,415 - Treating pelts (1880)
- U.S. patent 367,634 - Door spring and buffer (1889)
- U.S. patent 1,488,251 - Baking apparatus (1917)
- U.S. patent 1,488,252 - Baking process (1917)
- U.S. patent 1,353,394 - Wire wheel (1920)
- U.S. patent 1,353,395 - Method of forming wire spoke nipples (1920)
- U.S. patent 1,357,056 - Wire wheel truing stand (1920)
- U.S. patent 1,380,802 - Portable wheel rack (1921)
- U.S. patent 1,417,916 - Paper cup (1922)
- U.S. patent 1,442,542 - Link belting (1923)
- U.S. patent 1,458,579 - Metal barrel (1923)
- U.S. patent 1,485,136 - Barrel lid (1924)
- U.S. patent 1,625,609 - Link belting (1924)
