= Globotype =

Colour display for telecommunications patented in 1855

The Globotype is a colour display for telecommunications. It was invented and patented by David McCallum of Stonehouse, Devon, England. The device features very low cost and does not use consumable supplies. It is Royal Letters Patent No. 2924 issued December 29, 1855. The design and coding used is described in Froehlich/Kent Encyclopedia of Telecommunications, Volume 2, pages 461 and 462. Mr. McCallum invented the Globotype in response to the use of printing telegraph machines which he saw as both expensive and unneeded.

"They are all very ingeniously contrived ... but why attach such combersome expensive machinery for the purpose of printing the letters? If a message must be printed, why not have a man in the office do it? He will do it better than it can be done by galvanic power attached to a telegraph wire, etc. etc." -David McCallum

The inventor published a small booklet in 1856 entitled: THE GLOBOTYPE TELEGRAPH: A recording instrument, by which small coloured balls are released one-by-one, and made to pass over a series of inclined planes, by the force of their own gravity. The booklet was originally published by Longman, Brown, Green, and Longmans of London.

It is cited and described in Froehlich/Kent Encyclopedia of Telecommunications, volume 2 pages 461 and 462.

== See also ==
- Telegraphy
- Morse code
