= Royal Earl House =

American inventor (1814–1895)

Royal Earl House (9 September 1814 – 25 February 1895) was the inventor of the first printing telegraph, which is kept in the Smithsonian Institution. His nephew Henry Alonzo House was also an early American inventor.

Royal Earl House spent his childhood in Vermont experimenting, designing, and building, a habit which would earn him distinction as an adult. He once caught a toad, skinned it, placed a set of springs in the skin and made it hop. Around 1840, he went to Buffalo, New York to live with relatives and attend law school in that town. However, he read a work on electricity which so inspired him that he decided to give up law and study the science of electricity instead. He was also interested in mechanics, chemistry and magnetism.

By 1846, the Morse telegraph service was operational between Washington, DC, and New York. Royal Earl House patented his printing telegraph that same year. He linked two 28-key piano-style keyboards by wire. Each piano key represented a letter of the alphabet and when pressed caused the corresponding letter to print at the receiving end. A "shift" key gave each main key two optional values. A 56-character typewheel at the sending end was synchronised to coincide with a similar wheel at the receiving end. If the key corresponding to a particular character was pressed at the home station, it actuated the typewheel at the distant station just as the same character moved into the printing position, in a way similar to the daisy wheel printer. It was thus an example of a synchronous data transmission system. House's equipment could transmit around 40 instantly readable words per minute, but was difficult to manufacture in bulk. The printer could copy and print out up to 2,000 words per hour. This invention was first put in operation and exhibited at the Mechanics Institute in New York in 1844.

In 1886 and 1887, when the Royal E. House telegraph company was producing the printing telegraph, the Morse Telegraph company tried to enjoin (legally prevent) them from infringing on the Morse patents. Morse claimed the sole right of transmitting intelligence by electricity, utilizing the Morse code. The courts decided the House Company did not infringe the Morse patent, as the messages using the House system were all printed on a slip of paper, without the use of Morse Code.

Later the House Co. and the Morse Co. joined and formed the Great Western Telegraph Company.
