= Printing telegraph =

Teleprinter invented in 1846 by Royal Earl House

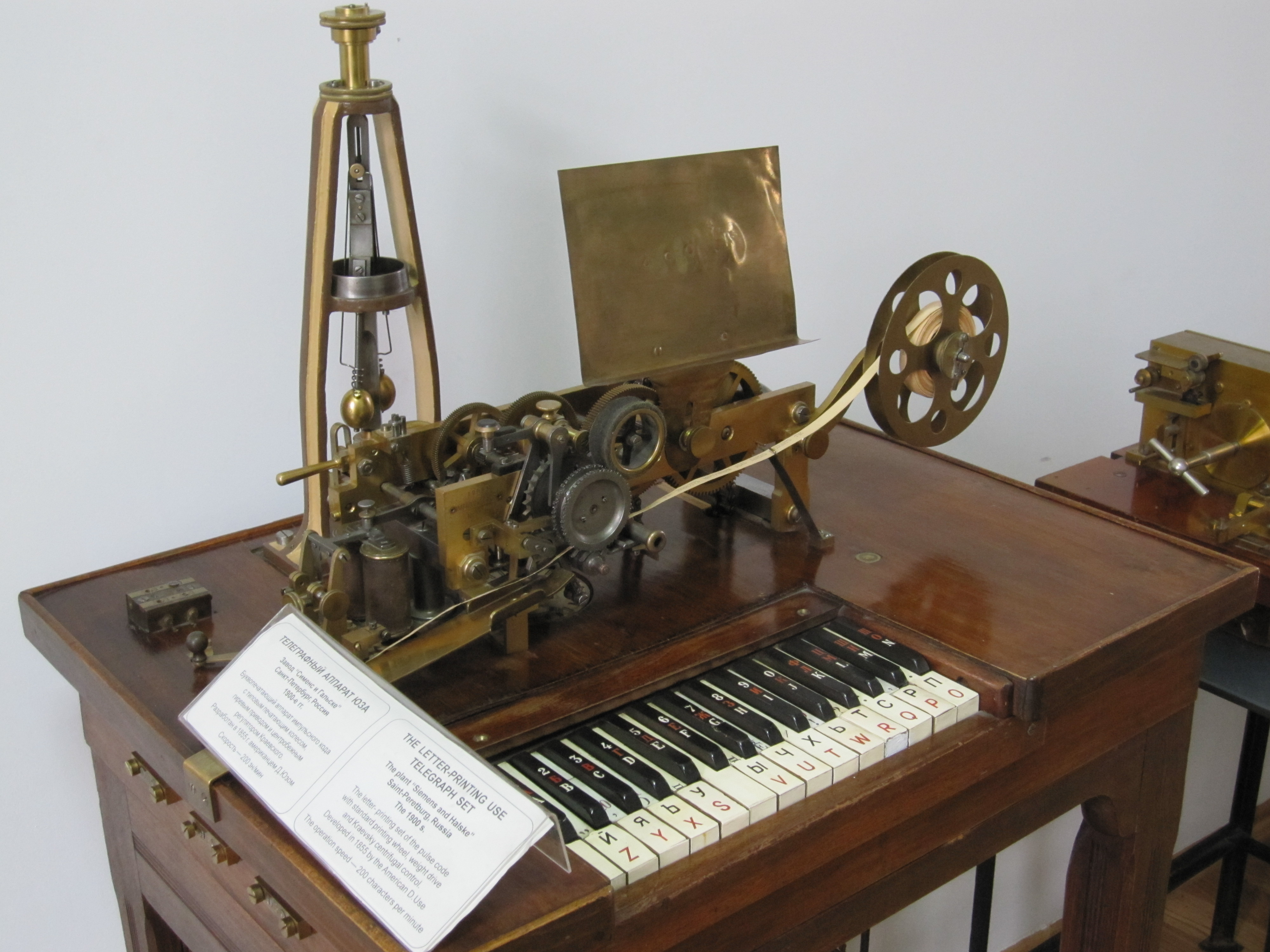
A Printing Telegraph Set built by Siemens & Halske in Saint Petersburg, Russia, ca.1900

The printing telegraph is a device for sending and receiving telegraph messages. The sending operator uses a piano-style keyboard to directly input the text of the message, and the receiver instantly prints the text of the message on a paper strip.

== History ==
The printing telegraph was invented by Royal Earl House in 1846. House's telegraph could transmit around 40 instantly readable words per minute, but was difficult to manufacture in bulk. The printer could copy and print out up to 2,000 words per hour. This invention was first put in operation and exhibited at the Mechanics Institute in New York.

House's Type Printing Telegraph of 1849 was Royal Earl House's second and much improved type-printing instrument and was widely used on lines on America's east coast from 1850. David Hughes telegraph devices, which also had piano style keyboards, were very popular in France, where there were likely many more piano and harpsichord players than telegraphers.

Early stock ticker machines are also examples of printing telegraphs.

== Operation ==
Input into device was facilitated through two 28-key piano-style keyboards. Each piano key represented a letter of the alphabet and when pressed, electronically transmitted that letter to a receiving printing telegraph as code. The requested letter would then be printed by that recipient telegraph.

A "shift" key allowed an alternative character to be assigned to each key, for example a digit or punctuation mark instead of a letter. A 56-character typewheel at the sending end was synchronised to run at the same speed and to maintain the same angular position as a similar wheel at the receiving end. When the key corresponding to a particular character was pressed at the home station, it actuated the typewheel at the distant station just as the same character moved into the printing position, in a way similar to the daisy wheel printer. It was thus an example of a synchronous data transmission system.

== Advantages ==
The benefit of the Printing Telegraph is that it allows the operator to use a piano-style keyboard to directly input the text of the message. The receiver would then receive the instantly readable text of the message on a paper strip. This is in contrast to the telegraphs that used Morse Code dots and dashes which needed to be converted into readable text.

"The Western Union Telegraph Company is now putting in a new patent telegraph printing machine on the Chicago line and hereafter dispatches transmitted over this line will be printed as they are received at the office in this city. The machine is furnished with keys similar to a piano, each key representing a letter in the alphabet, and by a peculiar mechanical arrangement each letter is printed as it is received at the office. Thus all mistakes arising from blind chirography will be thoroughly appreciated by our citizens. The machine will be put into operation this afternoon."

== Disadvantages ==
Printing Telegraphs were quite temperamental and suffered frequent breakdowns. Transmission speed was also much slower than the Morse system. The complexity of the original House device meant that production was limited. An improved version was designed by George Phelps. The Globotype was invented by David McCallum as a response to problems with the printing telegraph.

== Key layouts ==
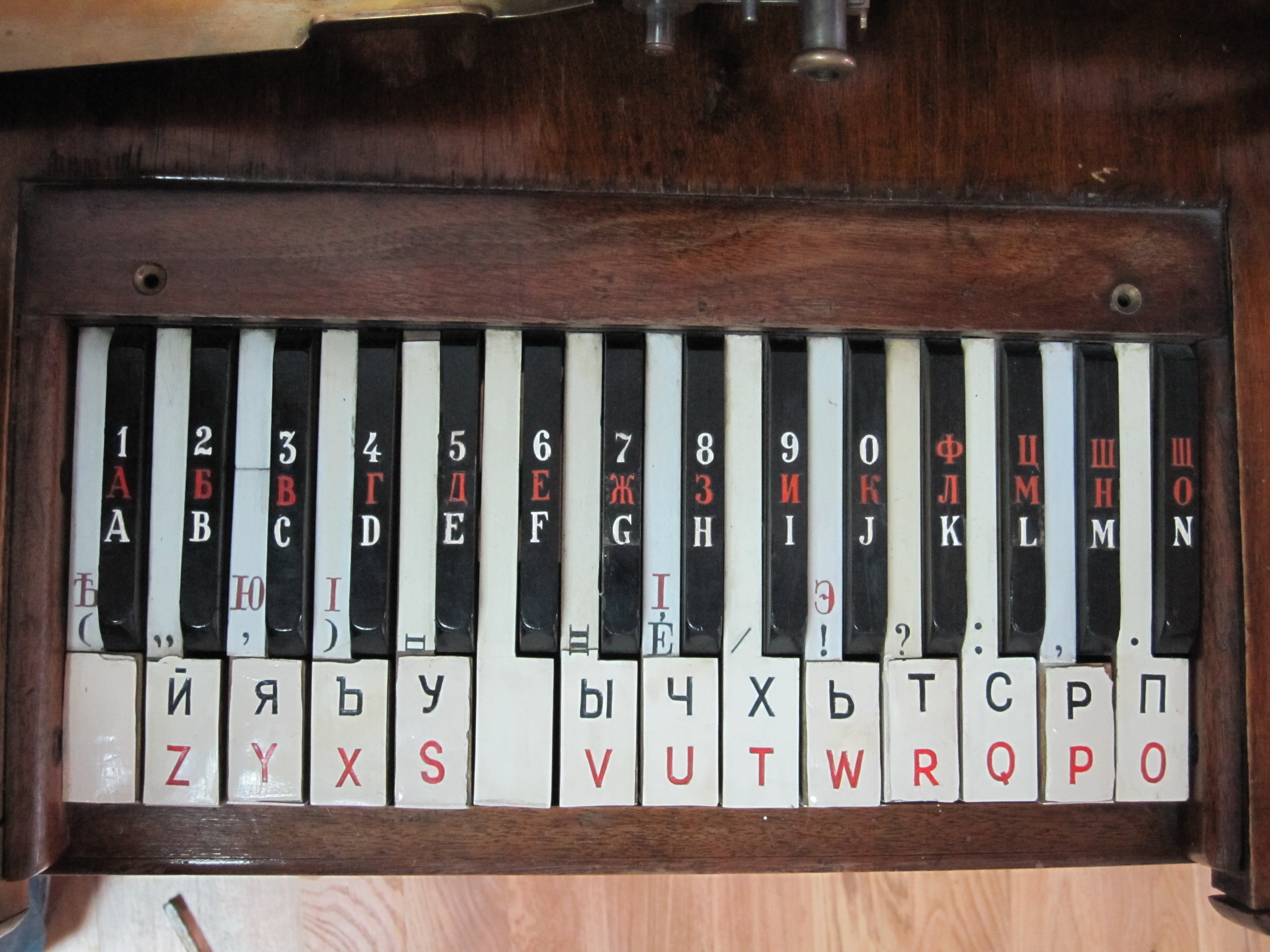
An example of a Cyrillic key layout on a Printing Telegraph Set built by Siemens & Halske in Saint Petersburg, Russia, ca.1900

Various layouts were produced to improve the efficiency of the keyboard system and accommodate several other alphabets.

== See also ==
- Teleprinter
