= Kareem Rosser =

American polo player and author

Personal information
- Nationality: American
- Born: c. 1998 West Philadelphia, Pennsylvania, U.S.
- Education: Colorado State University (BA)
- Occupations: Polo player, author
- Website: kareemrosser.com

Sport
- Sport: Polo
- Team: Work to Ride (youth); Colorado State Rams

Kareem Rosser (born c. 1998) is an American polo player and author from West Philadelphia, Pennsylvania. He led the team, Work to Ride, to two consecutive National Interscholastic Polo Championships alongside his brother, becoming part of the first all-Black team to win the championship. Rosser is the author of two books, Crossing the Line, which received an Alex Award, and When You're Ready.

He captained the 2015 Colorado State University polo team to a national title, ending a 16-year drought. Rosser is the 2015 United States Polo Association Polo Training Foundation Male Intercollegiate Player of the Year.

== Early life and education ==
Rosser was born and raised in West Philadelphia. He is one of six children raised by his single mother. Rosser has recalled seeing horses in his neighborhood regularly. As children, he and his siblings interacted with the wildlife in their local pond. He recalled being exposed to horses through the "local urban cowboy culture of West Philadelphia."

At the age of eight, Rosser and his siblings discovered Work to Ride, a nonprofit organization founded by Lezlie Hiner in Fairmount Park that introduces inner-city youth to polo and horsemanship. Rosser began formal riding instruction soon afterward. By the age of nine, he had started playing polo and competing in matches through the program. In eighth grade, he received a scholarship to attend and play polo for Valley Forge Military Academy.

Rosser attended Tompkins Cortland Community College for one year before transferring to Colorado State University. He graduated from Colorado State with a Bachelor of Arts in Economics in 2016. In 2019, the school awarded him with the Distinguished Graduate of the Last Decade Award.

== Playing career ==
In 2011, Rosser and his teammates, Daymar Rosser and Brandon Reese, entered the National Interscholastic Polo Championship under Work to Ride. Prior to the tournament, they won the Southeast Regional championship. This win placed them as the number two ranked team in the nation.

=== 2011 championship run ===
In the first round of the tournament, they defeated a team from Midland, Texas 24-8. They received a bye in the second round due to their ranking. In the finals, they defeated a Baltimore team 24-17. The game took place in Charlottesville, VA. Rosser, in response to being the first all-Black team to win the championship, said, "...we did it for every other African American young boy who comes from where we come from." He was named the tournament's top all-star.

=== 2012 championship run ===
The 2012 tournament was held at the Virginia Polo Center in Charlottesville. Work to Ride defeated California-based team Poway 19–15 in the semi-finals. In the finals, they defeated Eldorado, another California-based team, in a double-overtime shootout that ended 20-19. Rosser was selected as a tournament all-star.

In 2013, Rosser and Work to Ride played in the third annual Scottsdale Ferrari-Maserati Polo Championships in a game against 2012 college champions, University of Virginia. Rosser noted that that they were fortunate to win against Harvard a year prior and that it was going to be "a tougher challenge beating Virginia." They lost 2-13. Rosser scored one goal.

=== Colorado State Rams ===
Rosser, as a freshman, and his team reached the finals of the 2013 United States Polo Association collegiate championships. They lost to Westmont College in a 16–19 defeat. Westmont would go on to win the 2014 season. In the 2015 season, Colorado State entered the tournament as the number one seed with an 8–1 record. In the semi-final, Colorado State defeated Southern Methodist University 23–22 in an overtime shootout.

=== Game vs Texas A&M ===
The game was held at the University of Connecticut. Colorado State started the game on a six-goal deficit by the end of the first chukker. By half time, the score was 8-12. By the end of the third chukker, the score was 15-15. Rosser scored a team-high seven goals and maintained their lead until the end of the game. They defeated Texas A&M 20–17 to win the title.

== Writing career ==
Rosser is the author of two memoirs. His first book, Crossing the Line, chronicles his upbringing in West Philadelphia and his development as a polo player through the Work to Ride program.

His later work, When You're Ready, was published by Simon & Schuster and further established him as a writer beyond sports memoir.

Crossing the Line was selected by American Library Association for the 2022 Alex Award.

== Honors and achievements ==
Year	Award / Tournament	Result	Notes
2011	Goldin U-18 International Tournament	Winner	
	Governor's Cup 8-Goal (Fifth Chukker Polo Club)	Winner	
2012	US Open Arena Polo Championship	Runner-up	Competed as a member of BlackWatch Polo Team alongside Nacho Figueras; lost to the team led by Tommy Biddle.
2012	Veuve Clicquot Classic (16-goal)	Winner	
2015	Men's National Intercollegiate Polo Championship	Champion	Defeated Texas A&M, 20-17
2015	Polo Training Foundation Male Intercollegiate Player of the Year	Recipient	Awarded by United States Polo Association

== Personal life ==
Rosser has three brothers, Daymar, David and Jabbar. He has two sisters, one of whom is his twin, Kareema. In interviews, he has spoken about the influence of his family and mentors on his development, themes he later explored in his memoir Crossing the Line. Rosser remains involved with the Work to Ride program and has served in a leadership capacity following his playing career.

Rosser has credited the Work to Ride program with having a lasting impact on both his life and his family, citing horsemanship and mentorship as influential beyond sport. In interviews, he has emphasized the importance of access, exposure, and community support in shaping his development and has expressed a desire to inspire young people from similar backgrounds to pursue opportunities in polo and other fields. He is the current Executive Vice President of Work to Ride.

In interviews, he has described polo as both a competitive and social sport that has shaped his personal and professional outlook.
