= Trading room =

Room where traders operating on financial markets gather

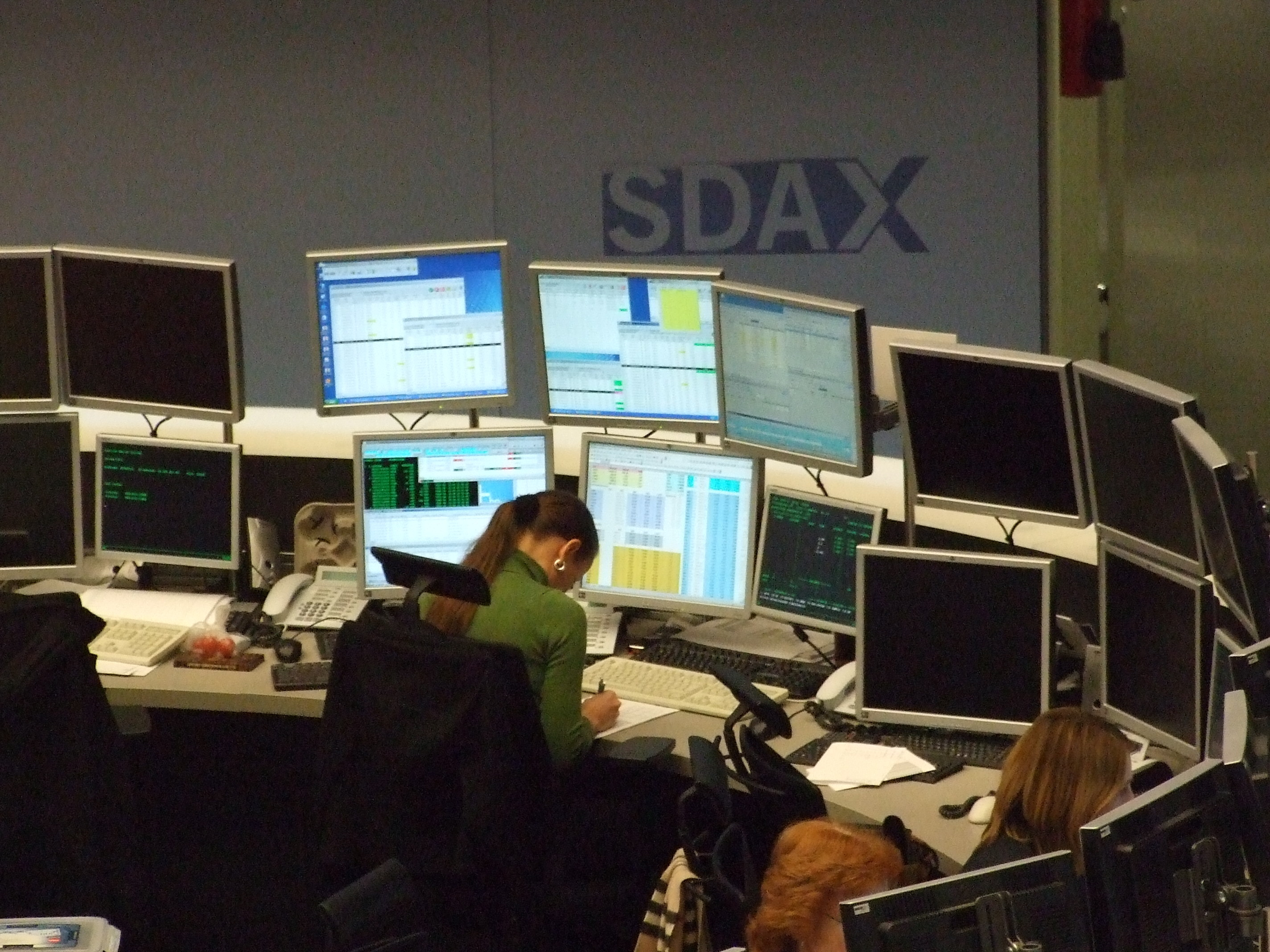
A stock trading desk at the Deutsche Börse

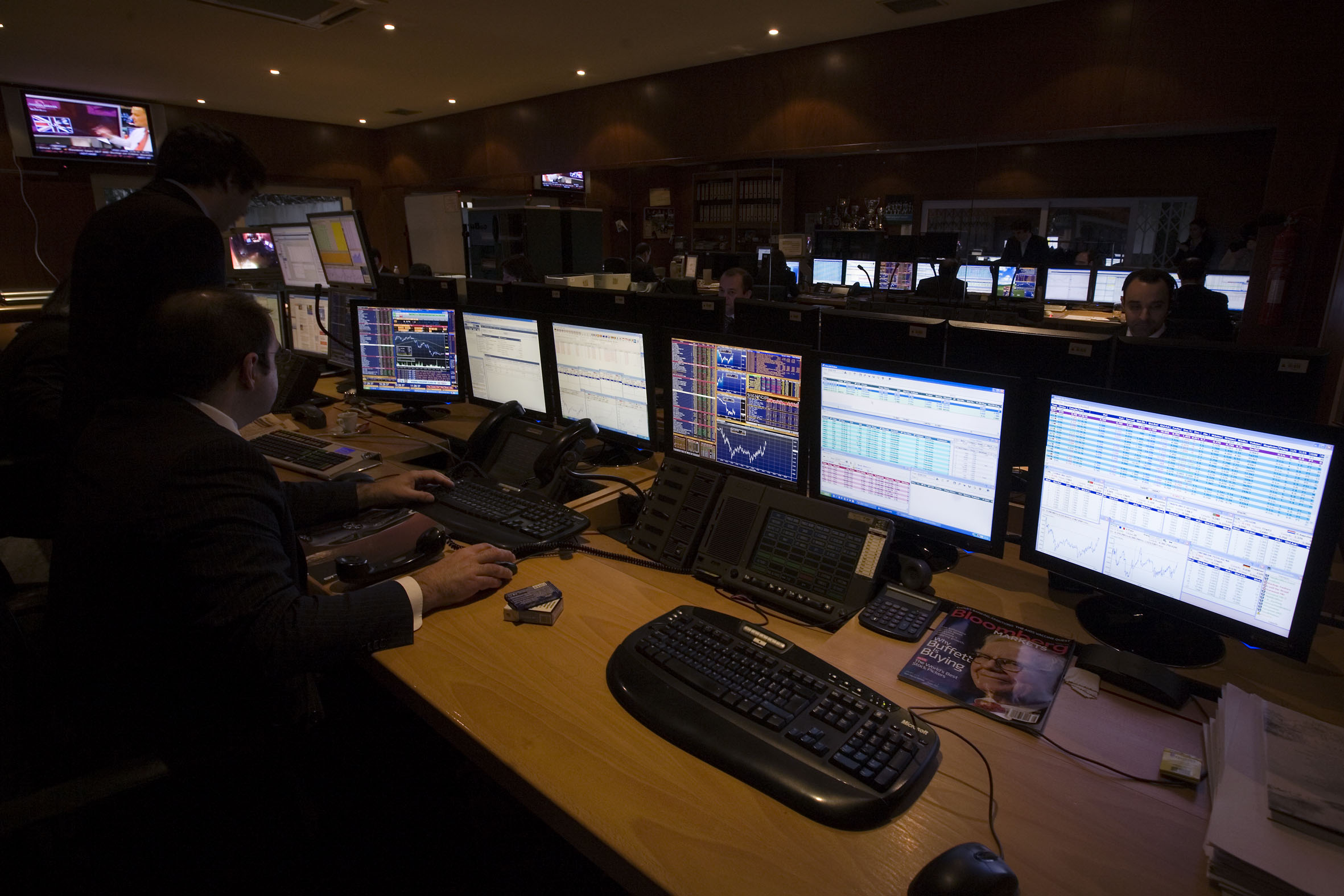
Trader's desk Banco Carregosa

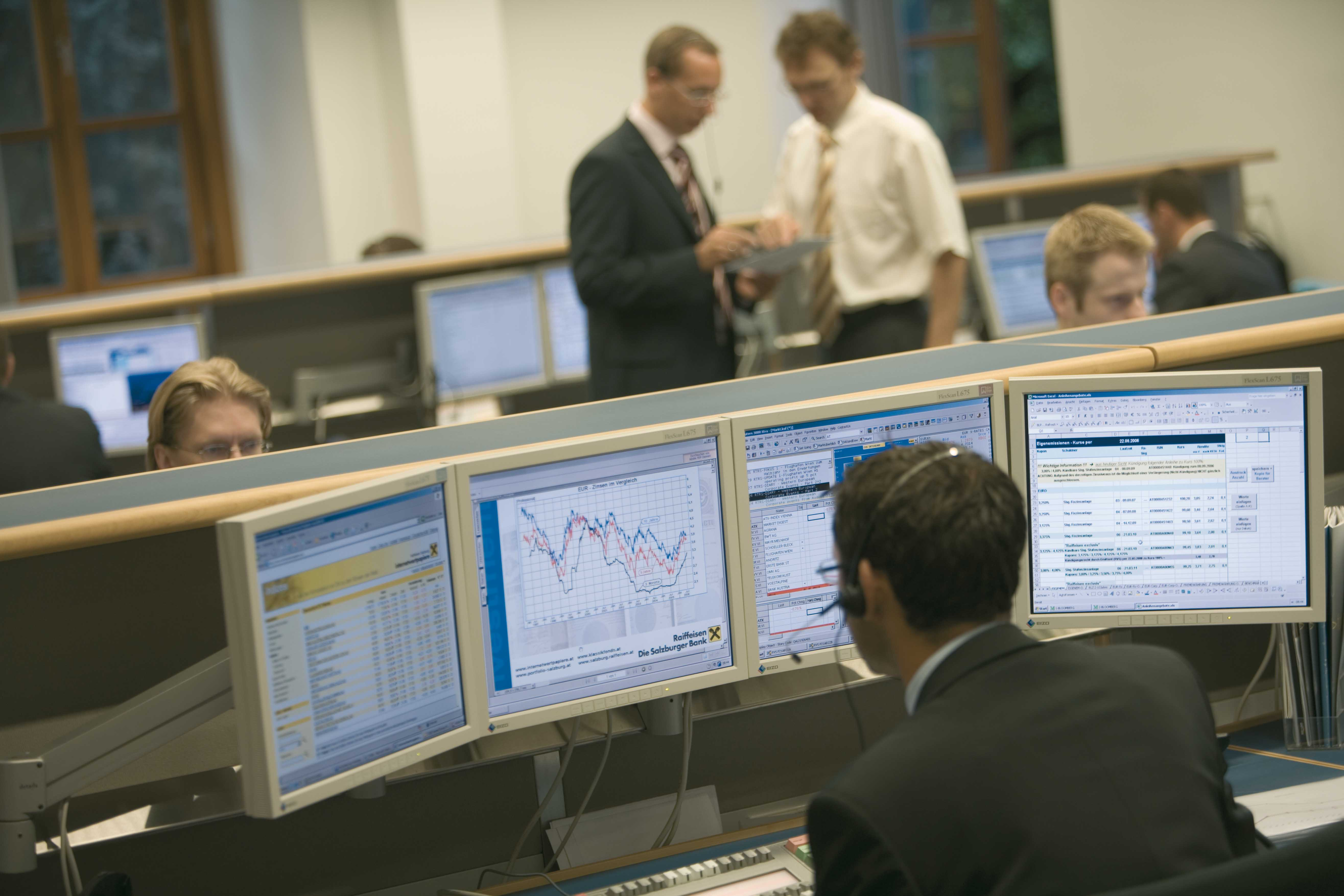
Raiffeisenverband Salzburg trading room

A trading room gathers traders operating on financial markets. The trading room is also often called the front office. The terms "dealing room" and "trading floor" are also used, the latter being inspired from that of an open outcry stock exchange. As open outcry is gradually replaced by electronic trading, the trading room becomes the only remaining place that is emblematic of the financial market. It is also the likeliest place within the financial institution where the most recent technologies are implemented before being disseminated in its other businesses.

Specialized computer labs that simulate trading rooms are known as "trading labs" or "finance labs" in universities and business schools.

== Origin ==
Before the 1960s or 1970s, the banks' capital market businesses were mostly split into many departments, sometimes scattered at several sites, as market segments: money market (domestic and currencies), foreign exchange, long-term financing, exchange, bond market. By gathering these teams to a single site, banks want to ease:

- a more efficient broadcast of market information, for greater reactivity of traders.
- idea confrontation on market trends and opportunities.
- desk co-ordination towards customers.

== Context ==
Trading rooms first appeared among United States bulge bracket brokers, such as Morgan Stanley, from 1971, with the creation of NASDAQ, which requires an equity trading desk on their premises, and the growth of the secondary market of federal debt products, which requires a bond trading desk.

The spread of trading rooms in Europe, between 1982 and 1987, has been subsequently fostered by two reforms of the financial markets organization, that were carried out roughly simultaneously in the United Kingdom and France.

In the United Kingdom, the Big Bang on the London Stock Exchange, removed the distinction between stockbrokers and stockjobbers, and prompted US investment banks, hitherto deprived of access to the LSE, to set up a trading room in the City of London.

In France, the deregulation of capital markets, carried out by Pierre Bérégovoy, Economics and Finance Minister, between 1984 and 1986, led to the creation of money-market instruments, of an interest-rate futures market, MATIF, of an equity options market, MONEP, the streamlining of sovereign debt management, with multiple-auction bond issues and the creation of a primary dealer status. Every emerging market segment raised the need for new dedicated trader positions inside the trading room.

== Businesses ==
A trading room serves two types of business:

- trading, and arbitrage, a business of investment banks and brokers, often referred to as the sell side.
- portfolio management, a business of asset management companies and institutional investors, often referred to as the buy side.

Brokers and investment banks set up their trading rooms first and large asset-management firms subsequently followed them.

The business type determines peculiarities in the organization and the software environment inside the trading room.

== Organization ==
Trading rooms are made up of "desks", specialised by product or market segment (equities, short-term, long-term, options...), that share a large open space.

An investment bank's typical room makes a distinction between:

- traders, whose role is to offer the best possible prices to sales, by anticipating market trends. After striking a deal with a sales, the trader arranges a reverse trade either with another trader belonging to another entity of the same institution or to an outside counterparty;
- market-makers, acting like wholesalers. Trades negotiated by market-makers usually bear standard terms.

Sales make deals tailored to their corporate customers' needs, that is, their terms are often specific. Focusing on their customer relationship, they may deal in the whole range of asset types.

Many large institutions have grouped their cash and derivative desks, while others, such as UBS or Deutsche Bank, for example, giving the priority to customer relationship, structure their trading room as per customer segment, around sales desks.

Some large trading rooms hosts offshore traders, acting on behalf of another entity of the same institution, located in another time-zone. One room in Paris may have traders paid for by the New York City subsidiary, and whose working hours are consequently shifted. On the foreign exchange desk, because this market is live on a 24/24 basis, a rolling book organisation can be implemented, whereby, a London-based trader, for instance, will inherit, at start of day, the open positions handed over by the Singapore, Tokyo, or Bahrain room, and manages them till his own end-of-day, when they are handed over to another colleague based in New York City.

Some institutions, notably those that invested in a rapid development (RAD) team, choose to blend profiles inside the trading room, where traders, financial engineers and front-office dedicated software developers sit side by side. The latter therefore report to a head of trading rather than to a head of IT.

More recently, a profile of compliance officer has also appeared; this officer makes sure the law, notably that relative to market use, and the code of conduct, are complied with.

The middle office and the back office are generally not located in the trading room.

The organisation is somewhat simpler with asset management firms:

- asset managers are responsible for portfolios or funds;
- "traders" are in contact with "brokers" – that is, with the above-mentioned investment banks' "sales"; however, this profile is absent from asset management firms that chose to outsource their trading desk.

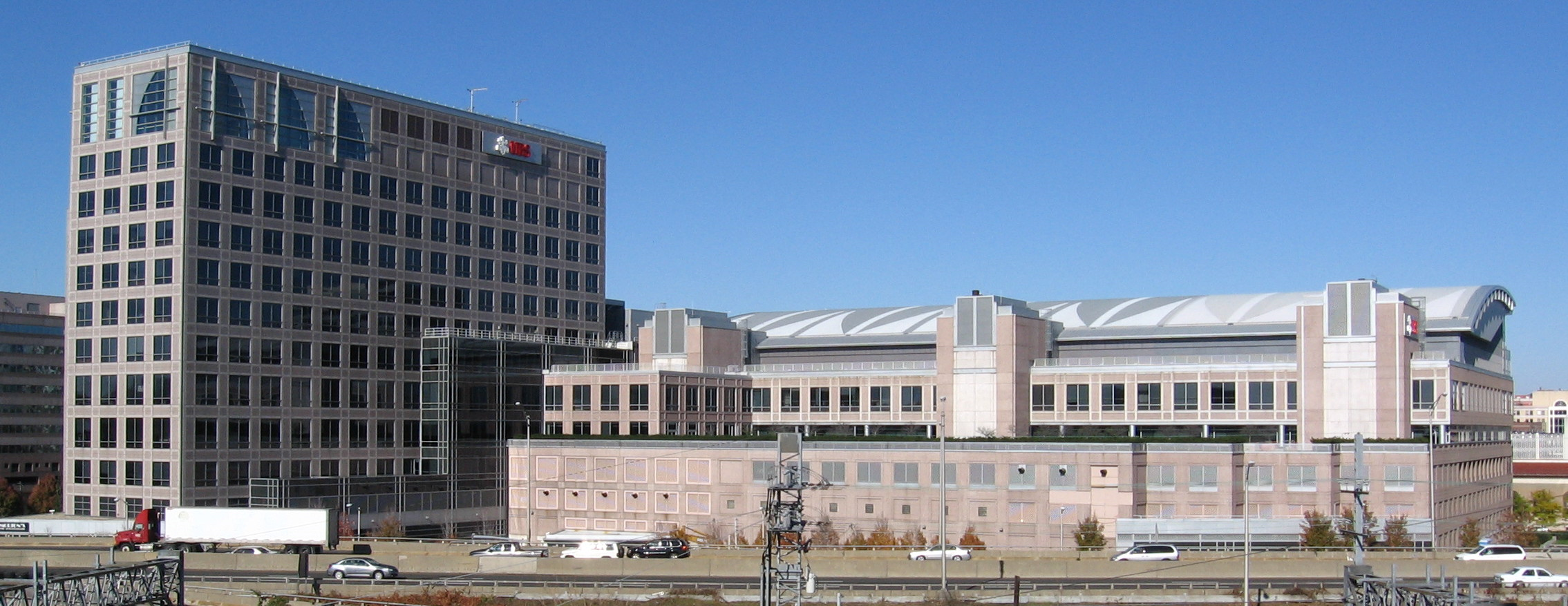
UBS North-American HQ: the trading room is under the bowed rooftop

The development of trading businesses, during the eighties and nineties, required ever larger trading rooms, specifically adapted to IT- and telephony cabling. Some institutions therefore moved their trading room from their downtown premises, from the City to Canary Wharf, from inner Paris to La Défense, and from Wall Street towards Times Square or New York City's residential suburbs in Connecticut; UBS Warburg, for example, built a trading room in Stamford, Connecticut in 1997, then enlarged it in 2002, to the world's largest one, with about 100,000 sq ft (9,300 m^{2}) floor space, allowing the installation of some 1,400 working positions and 5,000 monitors. The "Basalte" building of Société Générale is the first ever building specifically dedicated to trading rooms; it is fit for double power sourcing, to allow trading continuity in case one of the production sources is cut off. In the 2000s, JP Morgan was planning to construct a building, close to the World Trade Center site, where all six 60,000 sq ft (5,600 m^{2}) floors dedicated to trading rooms would be cantilevered, the available ground surface being only 32,000 sq ft (3,000 m^{2}).

== Infrastructure ==
=== The early years ===
Telephone and teleprinter have been the broker's first main tools. The teleprinter, or Teletype, got financial quotes and printed them out on a ticker tape. US equities were identified by a ticker symbol made of one to three letters, followed by the last price, the lowest and the highest, as well as the volume of the day. Broadcasting neared real time, quotes being rarely delayed by more than 15 minutes, but the broker looking for a given security's price had to read the tape...

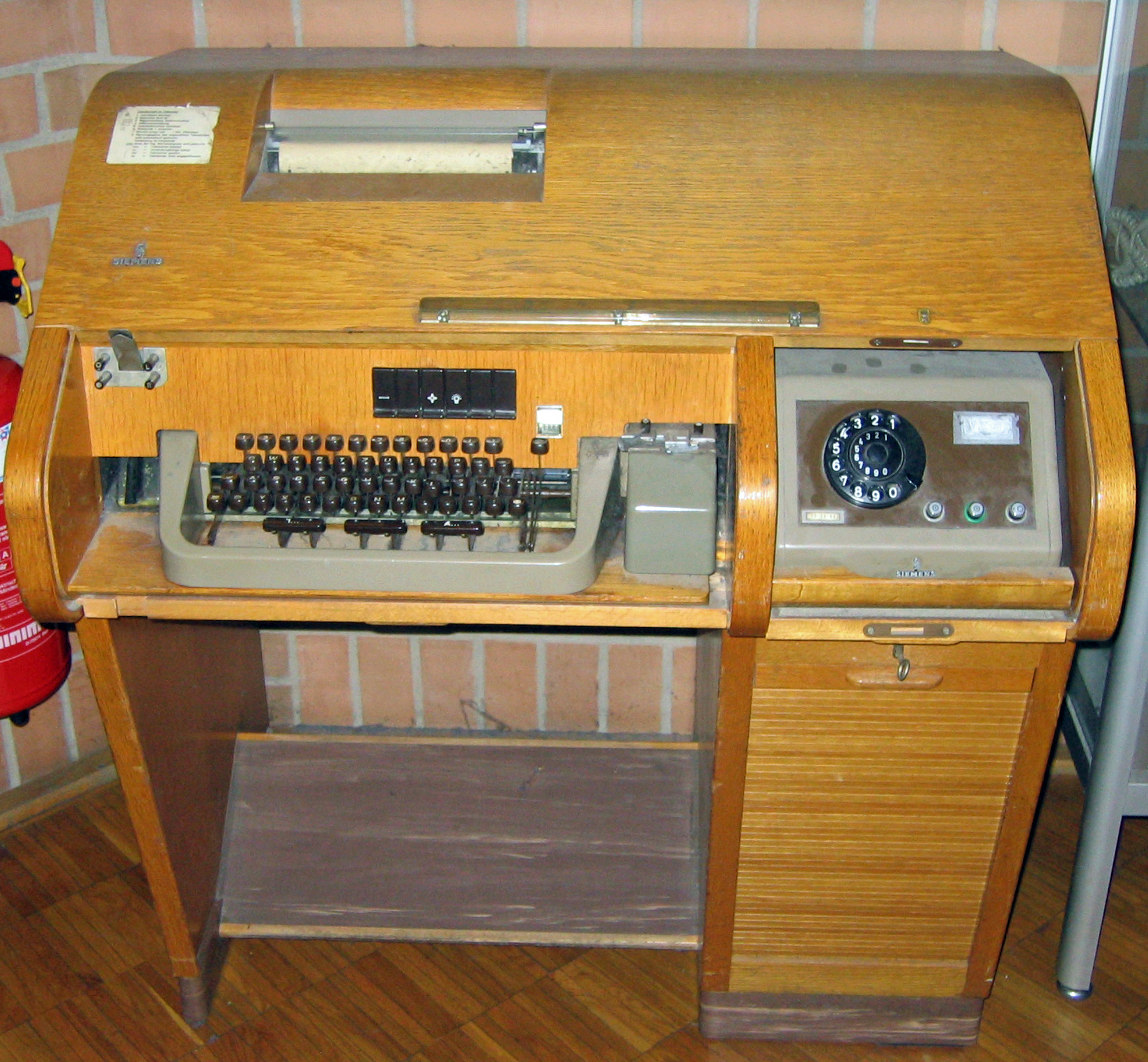
Teletype

As early as 1923, the Trans-Lux company installed the NYSE with a projection system of a transparent ticker tape onto a large screen. This system has been subsequently adopted by most NYSE-affiliated brokers till the 1960s.

In 1956, a solution called Teleregister, came to the market; this electro-mechanical board existed in two versions, of the top 50 or top 200 securities listed on the NYSE; but one had to be interested in those equities, and not in other ones...

During the 1960s, the trader's workstation was remarkable for the overcrowding of telephones. The trader juggled with handsets to discuss with several brokers simultaneously. The electromechanical, then electronic, calculator enabled him or her to perform basic computations.

In the 1970s, if the emergence of the PABX gave way to some simplification of the telephony equipment, the development of alternative display solutions, however, lead to a multiplication of the number of video monitors on their desks, pieces of hardware that were specific and proprietary to their respective financial data provider. The main actors of the financial data market were; Telerate, Reuters, Bloomberg with its Bloomberg Terminal, Knight Ridder notably with its Viewtron offering, Quotron and Bridge, more or less specialised on the money market, foreign exchange, securities market segments, respectively, for the first three of them.

=== The advent of spreadsheets ===
From the early 1980s, trading rooms multiplied and took advantage of the spread of micro-computing. Spreadsheets emerged with independent products released for MS-DOS/Windows platforms and Unix platforms. The IBM PCs of the early 1980s used Lotus 1-2-3, but by 1989 it had been mostly superseded by Excel for workstations and terminals. For UNIX, there were Applix and Wingz among others.

Excel quickly became popular among traders as a decision support tool to manage their position. This popularity encouraged the adoption of the Windows NT platform over other Unix or VAX/VMS platforms.

Though software alternatives multiplied during this decade, the trading room was suffering from a lack of interoperability and integration. To begin with, there was scant automated transmission of trades from the front-office desktop tools, notably Excel, towards the enterprise application software that gradually got introduced in back-offices; traders recorded their deals by filling in a form printed in a different colour depending on the direction (buy/sell or loan/borrow), and a back-office clerk came and picked piles of tickets at regular intervals, so that these could be re-captured in another system.

=== The digital revolution ===
Video display applications were not only wrapped up in cumbersome boxes, their retrieval-based display mode was no longer adapted to markets that had been gaining much liquidity and henceforth required decisions in a couple of seconds. Traders expected market data to reach them in real time, with no intervention required from them with the keyboard or the mouse, and seamlessly feed their decision support and position handling tools.

The digital revolution, which started in the late 1980s, was the catalyst that helped meet these expectations. It found expression, inside the dealing room, in the installation of a digital data display system, a kind of local network. Incoming flows converged from different data providers, and these syndicated data were distributed onto traders' desktops. One calls a feed-handler the server that acquires data from the integrator and transmits them to the local distribution system.

Reuters (TRIARCH 2000), Teknekron (TIB/TTRS), and Micrognosis (MIPS) soon entered this market. Their infrastructure provided the foundation for desktop applications that acquired, displayed, and graphically analyzed market data.

This type of software usually enables the trader to assemble the relevant information into composite pages, comprising a news panel, in text format, sliding in real time from bottom to top, a quotes panel, for instance spot rates against the US dollar, every quote update or « tick » showing up in reverse video during one or two seconds, a graphical analysis panel, with moving averages, MACD, candlesticks or other technical indicators, another panel that displays competitive quotes from different brokers, etc...

Two software package families were belonging to this new generation of tools, one dedicated to Windows-NT platforms, the other to Unix and VMS platforms.

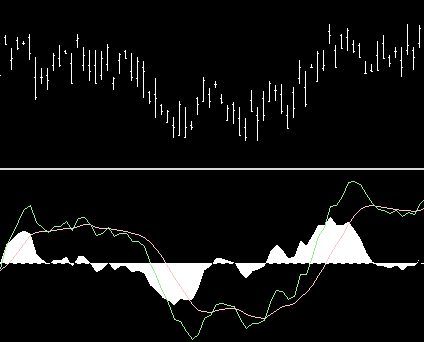
technical analysis graphically shows a given asset's behaviour over a long or short period of time, in order to help anticipate the price's future path.

However, Bloomberg and other, mostly domestic, providers, shunned this movement, preferring to stick to a service bureau model, where every desktop-based monitor just displays data that are stored and processed on the vendor's premises. The approach of these providers was to enrich their database and functionalities enough so that the issue of opening up their datafeed to any spreadsheet or third-party system gets pointless.

This decade also witnessed the irruption of television inside trading rooms. Press conferences held by central bank presidents are henceforth eagerly awaited events, where tone and gestures are decrypted. The trader has one eye on a TV set, the other on a computer screen, to watch how markets react to declarations, while having, very often, one customer over the phone. Reuters, Bloomberg, CNN, CNBC each propose their news channel specially dedicated to financial markets.

=== Internet and bandwidth ===
The development of the internet triggered the fall of the cost of information, including financial information. It hit a serious blow to integrators who, like Reuters, had invested a lot the years before to deliver data en masse and in real time to the markets, but henceforth recorded a wave of terminations of their data subscriptions as well as flagging sales of their data distribution and display software licences.

Moreover, the cable operators' investments lead to a huge growth of information transport capacity worldwide. Institutions with several trading rooms in the world took advantage of this bandwidth to link their foreign sites to their headquarters in a hub and spoke model. The emergence of technologies like Citrix supported this evolution, since they enable remote users to connect to a virtual desktop from where they then access headquarters applications with a level of comfort similar to that of a local user. While an investment bank previously had to roll out a software in every trading room, it can now limit such an investment to a single site. The implementation cost of an overseas site gets reduced, mostly, to the telecoms budget.

The IT architecture simplified and centralized allows for outsourcing. In recent years, the main technology providers active in the trading rooms market have been developing hosting services.

== Software equipment ==
From the late 1980s, worksheets have been rapidly proliferating on traders' desktops while the head of the trading room still had to rely on consolidated positions that lacked both real time and accuracy. The diversity of valuation algorithms, the fragility of worksheets incurring the risk of loss of critical data, the mediocre response times delivered by PCs when running heavy calculations, the lack of visibility of the traders' goings-on, have all raised the need for shared information technology, or enterprise applications as the industry later called it.

But institutions have other requirements that depend on their business, whether it is trading or investment.

=== Risk-management ===
Within the investment bank, the trading division is keen to implement synergies between desks, such as:

- hedging the currency risk born from foreign exchange swaps or forward positions;
- funding by the money market desk of positions left open at end of day;
- hedging bond positions by interest-rate futures or options contracts.

Such processes require mutualisation of data.

Hence a number of software packages came to market between 1990 and 1993: Infinity, Summit, Kondor+, Finance Kit, Front Arena, Murex and Sophis Risque, quickly marketed under the umbrella of risk-management, a term more flattering though somewhat less accurate than that of position-keeping.

Though Infinity died, in 1996, with the dream of the toolkit that was expected to model any innovation a financial engineer could have designed, the other systems are still well and alive in trading rooms. Born during the same period, they share many technical features, such as a three-tier architecture, whose back-end runs on a Unix platform, a relational database on either Sybase or Oracle, and a graphical user interface written in English, since their clients are anywhere in the world. Deal capture of transactions by traders, position-keeping, measure of market risks (interest-rates and foreign exchange), calculation of Profit & Loss (P&L), per desk or trader, control of limits set per counterparty, are the main functionalities delivered by these systems.

These functions will be later entrenched by national regulations, that tend to insist on adequate IT: in France, they are defined in 1997 in an instruction from the “Commission Bancaire” relative to internal control.

=== Electronic trading ===
Telephone, used on over-the-counter (OTC) markets, is prone to misunderstandings. Should the two parties fail to clearly understand each other on the trade terms, it may be too late to amend the transaction once the received confirmation reveals an anomaly.

The first markets to discover electronic trading are the foreign-exchange markets. Reuters creates its Reuter Monitor Dealing Service in 1981. Contreparties meet each other by the means of the screen and agree on a transaction in videotex mode, where data are loosely structured.

Several products pop up in the world of electronic trading including Bloomberg Terminal, BrokerTec, TradeWeb and Reuters 3000 Xtra for securities and foreign exchange. While the Italian-born Telematico (MTS) finds its place, in the European trading rooms for trading of sovereign-debt.

More recently other specialised products have come to the market, such as Swapswire, to deal interest-rate swaps, or SecFinex and EquiLend, to place securities loans or borrowings (the borrower pays the subscription fee to the service).

However, these systems also generally lack liquidity. Contrarily to an oft-repeated prediction, electronic trading did not kill traditional inter-dealer brokerage. Besides, traders prefer to mix both modes: screen for price discovery, and voice to arrange large transactions.

=== Order management and routing ===
For organised markets products, processes are different: customer orders must be collected and centralised; some part of them can be diverted for internal matching, through so-called alternative trading systems (ATS); orders with a large size, or on equities with poor liquidity or listed on a foreign bourse, and orders from corporate customers, whose sales contact is located in the trading room, are preferably routed either towards brokers, or to multilateral trading facilities (MTF); the rest goes directly to the local stock exchange, where the institution is electronically connected to.

Orders are subsequently executed, partially of fully, then allocated to the respective customer accounts. The increasing number of listed products and trading venues have made it necessary to manage this order book with an adequate software.

Stock exchanges and futures markets propose their own front-end system to capture and transmit orders, or possibly a programming interface, to allow member institutions to connect their order management system they developed in-house. But software publishers soon sell packages that take in charge the different communication protocols to these markets; The UK-based Fidessa has a strong presence among LSE members; Sungard Global Trading and the Swedish Orc Software are its biggest competitors.

=== Program trading ===
In program trading, orders are generated by a software program instead of being placed by a trader taking a decision. More recently, it is rather called algorithmic trading. It applies only to organised markets, where transactions do not depend on a negotiation with a given counterparty.

A typical usage of program trading is to generate buy or sell orders on a given stock as soon as its price reaches a given threshold, upwards or downwards. A wave of stop sell orders has been largely incriminated, during the 1987 financial crises, as the main cause of acceleration of the fall in prices. However, program trading has not stopped developing, since then, particularly with the boom of ETFs, mutual funds mimicking a stock-exchange index, and with the growth of structured asset management; an ETF replicating the FTSE 100 index, for instance, sends multiples of 100 buy orders, or of as many sell orders, every day, depending on whether the fund records a net incoming or outgoing subscription flow. Such a combination of orders is also called a basket. Moreover, whenever the weight of any constituent stock in the index changes, for example following an equity capital increase, by the issuer, new basket orders should be generated so that the new portfolio distribution still reflects that of the index. If a program can generate more rapidly than a single trader a huge quantity of orders, it also requires monitoring by a financial engineer, who adapts its program both to the evolution of the market and, now, to requirements of the banking regulator checking that it entails no market manipulation. Some trading rooms may now have as many financial engineers as traders.

The spread of program trading variants, many of which apply similar techniques, leads their designers to seek a competitive advantage by investing in hardware that adds computing capacity or by adapting their software code to multi-threading, so as to ensure their orders reach the central order book before their competitors'. The success of an algorithm therefore measures up to a couple of milliseconds. This type of program trading, also called high-frequency trading, conflicts however with the fairness principle between investors, and some regulators consider forbidding it .

=== Portfolio management ===
With order executions coming back, the mutual fund's manager as well the investment bank's trader must update their positions. However, the manager does not need to revalue his in real time: as opposed to the trader whose time horizon is the day, the portfolio manager has a medium to long-term perspective. Still, the manager needs to check that whatever he sells is available on his custodial account; he also needs a benchmarking functionality, whereby he may track his portfolio performance with that of his benchmark; should it diverge by too much, he would need a mechanism to rebalance it by generating automatically a number of buys and sells so that the portfolio distribution gets back to the benchmark's.

== Relations with the back-office ==
In most countries, the banking regulation requires a principle of independence between front-office and back-office: a deal made by the trading room must be validated by the back-office to be subsequently confirmed to the counterparty, to be settled, and accounted for. Both services must report to divisions that are independent from each at the highest possible level in the hierarchy.

In Germany, the regulation goes further, a "four eyes' principle" requiring that every negotiation carried by any trader should be seen by another trader before being submitted to the back-office.

In Continental Europe, institutions have been stressing, since the early 1990s, on Straight Through Processing (STP), that is, automation of trade transmission to the back-office. Their aim is to raise productivity of back-office staff, by replacing trade re-capture by a validation process. Publishers of risk-management or asset-management software meet this expectation either by adding back-office functionalities within their system, hitherto dedicated to the front-office, or by developing their connectivity, to ease integration of trades into a proper back-office-oriented package.

Anglo-Saxon institutions, with fewer constraints in hiring additional staff in back-offices, have a less pressing need to automate and develop such interfaces only a few years later.

On securities markets, institutional reforms, aiming at reducing the settlement lag from a typical 3 business days, to one day or even zero day, can be a strong driver to automate data processes.

As long as front-office and back-offices run separately, traders most reluctant to capture their deals by themselves in the front-office system, which they naturally find more cumbersome than a spreadsheet, are tempted to discard themselves towards an assistant or a middle-office clerk. An STP policy is then an indirect means to compel traders to capture on their own. Moreover, IT-based trade-capture, in the shortest time from actual negotiation, is growingly seen, over the years, as a "best practice" or even a rule.

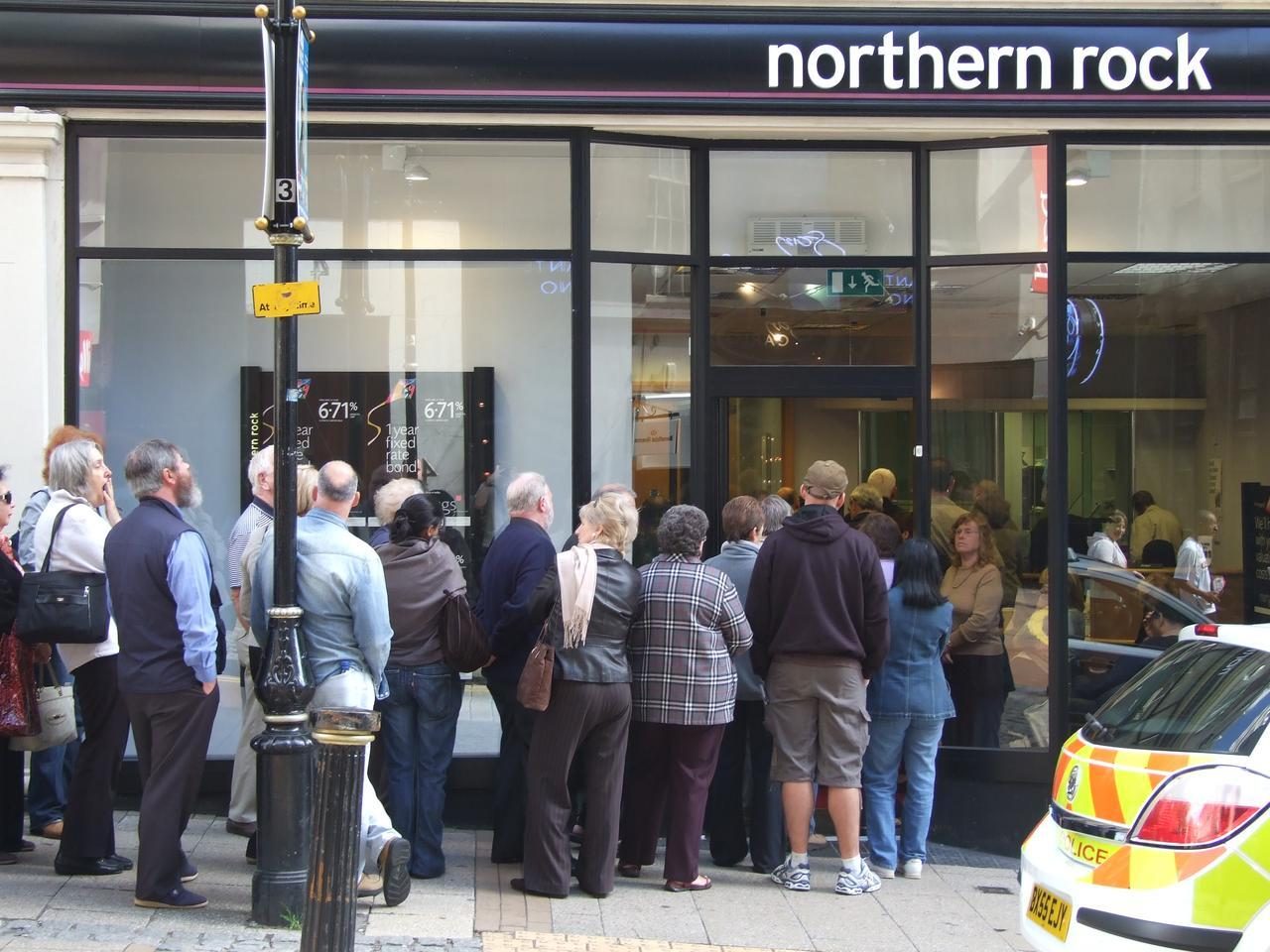
Depositors queuing to close their account with Northern Rock

Banking regulation tends to deprive traders from the power to revalue their positions with prices of their choosing. However, the back-office staff is not necessarily best prepared to criticize the prices proposed by traders for complex or hardly liquid instruments and that no independent source, such as Bloomberg, publicize.

== Anatomy of the biggest failures ==
Whether as an actor or as a simple witness, the trading room is the place that experiences any failure serious enough to put the company's existence at stake.

In the case of Northern Rock, Bear Stearns or Lehman Brothers, all three wiped out by the subprime crisis, in 2008, if the trading room finally could not find counterparts on the money market to refinance itself, and therefore had to face a liquidity crisis, each of those defaults is due to the company's business model, not to a dysfunction of its trading room.

On the contrary, in the examples shown below, if the failure has always been precipitated by market adverse conditions, it also has an operational cause :

Operational causes of the biggest failures
Month Year	Company	Fictitious trades	Hidden positions	Overshot positions	Insider trading	Market manipulation	Miscalculated risk	Erroneous valuation	Lack of trader control	Inadequate entitlement	Capture error	Conse- quences on the company
Apr. 1987	Merrill Lynch			b		b			b			
Feb. 1990	Drexel Burnham Lambert				b	b			b			fine and bankruptcy
Sep. 1991	Salomon Brothers				b							fine
Feb. 1995	Barings					b			b	b		bankruptcy
Apr. 1995	Kidder Peabody	b	b									
Jul. 1995	Daiwa	b		b					b			partial business closure
Jun. 1996	Sumitomo		b			b			b	b		fines + civil lawsuit
Jan. 1998	UBS						b	b				
Sep. 1998	Long-Term Capital Management						b					recapitalisation
Dec. 2005	Mizuho Securities										b	
Sep. 2006	Amaranth Advisors			b								
Jan. 2008	Société Générale	b	b	b					b			fine
Feb. 2008	Credit Suisse							b				
May. 2008	Morgan Stanley			b					b		b	fine
Oct. 2008	CITIC Pacific			b					b			

These operational causes, in the above columns, are due to organisational or IT flaws :

- A fictitious trade gets possible whenever the system allows to post a trade to either a fictitious counterparty, or to a real counterparty, but for which the system sends neither a confirmation to that counterparty nor an automated message to the back-office, for settlement and accounting;
- Hidden position, which are fraudulent, and excess over authorized positions, which is not, are also made possible by the absence of a mechanism of limits control with transmission of a warning to the Risk Department, or by the absence of reaction by the recipient of such a warning;
- Some insider trading cases can be explained by the proximity, inside the trading room, of desks with conflicting interests, such as the one that arranges equity issues with that invests on behalf of customers.
- Price manipulation is also possible if no control is made on the share of an instrument that is held in relation to the total outstanding on the market, whether this outstanding is the total number of stocks of a given corporate issuer, or is the open position of a listed derivative instrument;
- Risk can be miscalculated, because it depends on parameters whose quality cannot be assessed, or because excessive confidence is put in the mathematical model that is used;
- An erroneous valuation may stem from a fraudulent handling of reference prices, or because the lack of fresh quotations on an instrument, and the failure to consider an alternative, model-based, valuation, have led to the use of obsolete prices;
- The lack of trader's control can be assessed by the weakness of the reporting required from him, or by the lack of expertise or critique by the recipients of this reporting;
- A user entitlement may prove inadequate, either because it is granted by the hierarchy in contradiction with the industry's best practices, or because, though not granted, it is still enforced either because the system cannot manage it or because, by neglect, it has not been properly set up in that system;
- Finally, a capture error may arise in a system with weak plausibility controls, such as that on a trade size, or with no « four eyes principle » mechanism, whereby a manifest anomaly would have been detected and stopped by a second person.

== Destroyed rooms ==
- On May 5, 1996, during a Saturday to Sunday night, a fire, suspected to be criminal, ravaged the trading room of Crédit Lyonnais; trading businesses have been transferred in a couple of days to a backup, or disaster recovery, site, in outer Paris.
- On September 11, 2001, the attack against the World Trade Center destroyed the Cantor Fitzgerald's trading room and killed 658 persons, two-thirds of its workforce. Yet business resumed about one week later.

== Gambling ==
Trading rooms are also used in the sports gambling sector. The term is often used to refer to the liabilities and odds setting departments of bookmakers where liabilities are managed and odds are adjusted. Examples include internet bookmakers based in the Caribbean and also legal bookmaking operations in the United Kingdom such as William Hill, Ladbrokes and Coral which operate trading rooms to manage their risk. The growth of betting exchanges such as Betfair has also led to the emergence of "trading rooms" designed for professional gamblers. (reference: Racing Post newspaper 19/7/07) The first such establishment was opened in Edinburgh in 2003 but later folded. Professional gamblers typically pay a daily "seat" fee of around £30 per day for the use of IT facilities and sports satellite feeds used for betting purposes. Today there are eight such trading rooms across the UK, with two based in London – one in Highgate and one in Canary Wharf.

== See also ==
- Regulation NMS
- Security (finance)
