= Neil Hirsch =

American businessman and entrepreneur (1947–2021)

Neil S. Hirsch
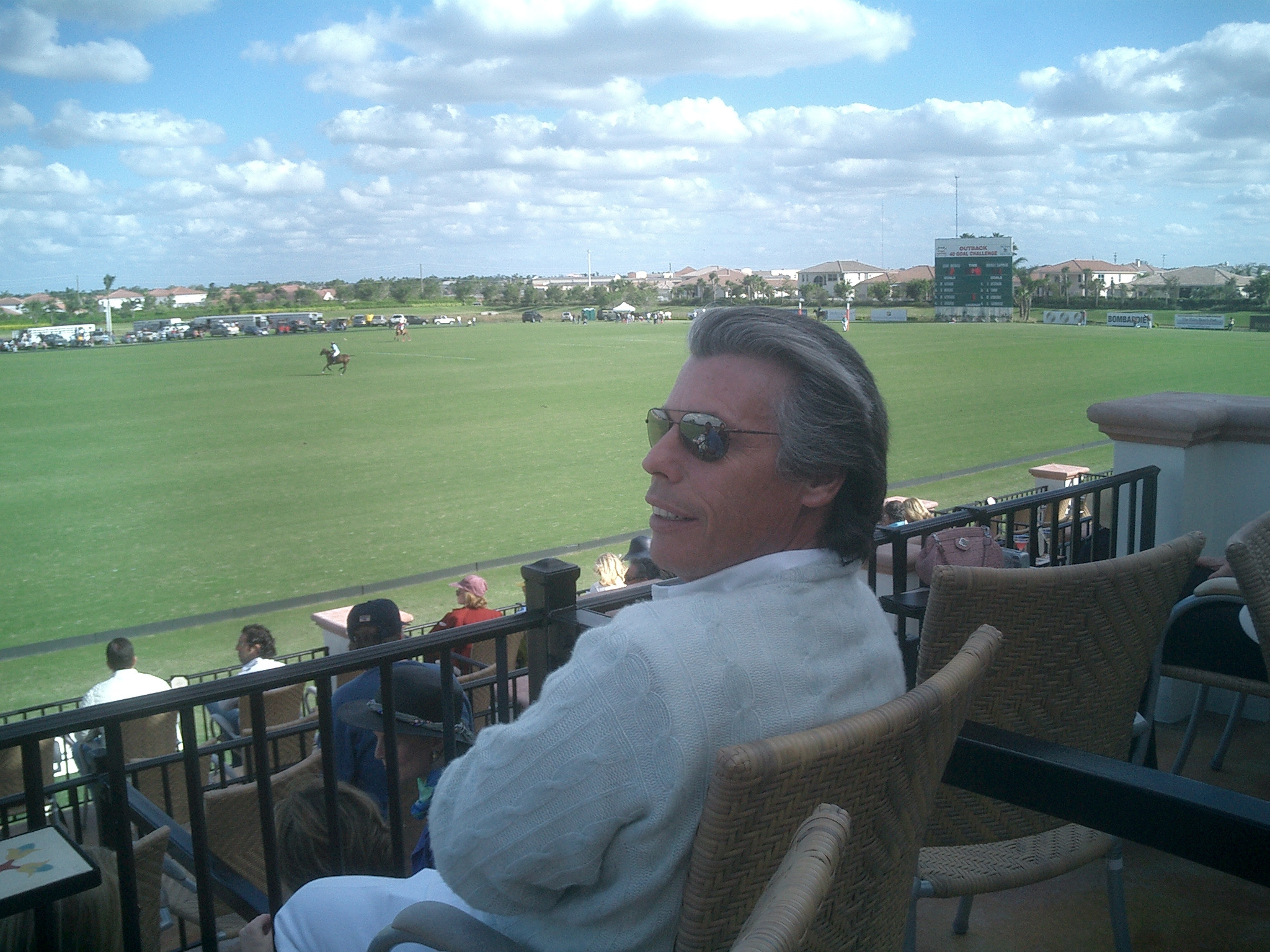
- Hirsch in February 2005
- Born: June 7, 1947; St. Louis, Missouri
- Died: June 24, 2021 (aged 74); Wellington, Florida
- Occupation: Entrepreneur
- Spouse: Caroline Hirsch
- Parent(s): Harold Hirsch, Ida Bell Hirsch
- Relatives: Emmett Shear

Neil S. Hirsch (June 7, 1947 – June 24, 2021) was an American businessman, entrepreneur and philanthropist. He was the founder of Telerate, a pioneering global financial communications network, as well as Loanet, a securities-tracking firm.

Hirsch was a prominent figure in the equestrian world, owning the Black Watch Polo Team and co-founding the Bridgehampton Polo Club.

== Career ==
At the age of 21, Hirsch dropped out of the University of Bridgeport to pursue his entrepreneurial ambitions. In 1969, Hirsch founded Telerate, a global communications network that provided real-time financial information to institutions worldwide. Under Hirsch's leadership as president and chief executive, Telerate became a crucial platform in the financial services industry. By 1990, the company was sold to Dow Jones & Company for over $1.5 billion, marking one of the most successful business deals of its time.

Hirsch later founded Loanet, a firm that specialized in securities-tracking, and served as its chairman. Loanet had become a dominant player in the US securities lending market by the time Hirsch sold to SunGard Data Systems in 2001, bolstering Hirsch's reputation as an innovator in financial technology.

In December 2013, Hirsch expanded his business portfolio by purchasing Backstage magazine and Sonicbids, companies that served the entertainment and music industries. Hirsch's RZ Capital sold its share of these ventures in 2018.

== Personal life ==
In 1973, he married Caroline Hirsch. In 1981, the couple acquired Carolines on Broadway, a former New York comedy club. After a 14-year union, they separated and divorced in 1988.

In 1999, Hirsch purchased the Player's Club Restaurant in Wellington, Florida.

== Polo ==
In 1995, Hirsch co-founded the Bridgehampton Polo Club with his childhood friend Peter M. Brant. The club quickly attracted top players. Hirsch served as its president for many years, until he sold his share to Peter Brant in 2011.

Hirsch also founded the Black Watch Polo Team, which became notable for star players such as Nacho Figueras, Facundo Pieres and Mariano Aguirre. Ralph Lauren became the team's corporate sponsor in 2007, following Figueras' role as the face of Ralph Lauren's Black Label clothing line and the Polo Black fragrance line.

Hirsch's impact on polo, particularly in Bridgehampton and Wellington, helped elevate the sport's visibility in the U.S. Hirsch was also an advocate for anti-doping legislation in equestrian sports.

== Philanthropy ==
Hirsch was a notable philanthropist recognized for his significant contributions to the Wellington community. In 2012, Hirsch donated $1.5 million to help build the village's Neil S. Hirsch Family Boys & Girls Club.
