= Stock market data systems =

Stock market data systems communicate market data—information about securities and stock trades—from stock exchanges to stockbrokers and stock traders.

== History ==
The earliest stock exchanges were in France in the 12th century and in Bruges and Italy in the 13th. Presumably data about trades in those times was written down by scribes and traveled by courier. In the early 19th century Reuters sent data by carrier pigeons between Germany and Belgium In London early exchanges were located near coffee houses which may have played a part in trading.

=== Chalk boards ===
In the late 1860s, in New York, young men called "runners" prices between the exchange and broker's offices, and often these prices were posted by hand on large chalk boards in the offices. Updating a chalk board was an entry point for many traders getting into financial markets and as mentioned in the book Reminiscences of a Stock Operator those updating the boards would wear fur sleeves so they would not accidentally erase prices.

The New York Stock Exchange is known as the "Big Board", perhaps because of these large chalk boards. Until recently, in some countries such chalkboards continued in use. Morse code was used in Chicago until 1967 for traders to send data to clerks called "board markers".

=== Newspapers ===
From 1797 to 1811 in the United States, the New York Price Current was first published. It was apparently the first newspaper to publish stock prices, and also showed prices of various commodities.

In 1884 the Dow Jones company published the first stock market averages, and in 1889 the first issue of the Wall Street Journal appeared. As time passed, other newspapers added market pages. The New York Times was first published in 1851, and added stock market tables at a later date.

== Electronic systems ==
=== Ticker tape ===
In 1863 Edward A. Calahan of the American Telegraph Company invented a stock telegraph printing instrument which allowed data on stocks, bonds, and commodities to be sent directly from exchanges to broker offices around the country. It printed the data on 0.75 inches (1.9 cm) wide paper tape wound on large reels. The sound it made while printing earned it the name "stock ticker". Other inventors improved on this device, and ultimately Thomas Edison patented a "universal stock ticker", selling over 5,000 in the late 19th century.

In the early 20th century Western Union acquired rights to an improved ticker which could deal with the increasing volume of stocks sold per day.

At the time of the stock market crash in October, 1929, trading volumes were so high that the tickers fell behind, contributing to the panic. In the 1930s the New York Quotation Stock Ticker became widely used. A further improvement was in place in 1960.

In 1923 Trans Lux Corporation delivered a rear projection system which projected the moving ticker onto a screen where all in a brokerage office could see it. It was a great success, and by 1949 there were more than 1400 stock-ticker projectors in the U.S. and another 200 in Canada. In 1959 they started shipping a Trans-Video system called CCTV which gave a customer a small video desk monitor where he could monitor the tickers.

In August 1963 Ultronics introduced Lectrascan, the first wall mounted all electronic ticker display system. By 1964 there were over 1100 units in operation in stock broker offices in the U.S. and Canada.

Competition, including Ultronics' Lectrscan electron wall system, led Trans-Lux to introduce the Trans-Lux Jet. Jets of air controlled lighted disks which moved on a belt on the broker's wall. Brokers ordered over 1000 units in the first six months, and by the middle of 1969 more than 3000 were in use in the U.S. and Canada.

=== Automatic quotation boards ===
A quotation board is a large vertical electronic display located in a brokerage office, which automatically gives current data on stocks chosen by the local broker. In 1929 the Teleregister Corporation installed the first such display, and by 1964 over 650 brokerage offices had them.

The information included the previous day's closing price, opening price, high for the day, low for the day, and current price. Teleregister offered data from the New York, American, Midwest, Chicago Mercantile, Commodity, New York Cocoa, New York coffee and sugar, New York Mercantile, New York Produce, New York Cotton, and New Orleans Cotton exchanges, along with the Chicago Board of Trade.

Some firms had a battery of telephone operators seated in front of a Teleregister board to supply commission houses with price and volume data. In 1962 two such batteries handled over 39,000 calls per day.

In 1955 Scantlin Electronics, Inc. introduced a competitive display system very similar in appearance but with digits twice the size of Teleregister's, fitting into the same board area. It was less expensive and soon was installed in many broker offices.

== Stock market quotation systems ==
In the late 1950s brokers had become accustomed to several problems doing business with their customers. To make a trade, an investor had to know the current price for the stock. The investor got this from a broker who could find it on his board. If the last trade (or the stock itself) had not made it to the board (or there was no board) the broker telegraphed a request for the price to that firm's "wire room" in New York. There, such requests would be forwarded to the floor of the appropriate exchange, where messengers could copy down prices at the locations where those stocks were traded, and telephone answers back to the wire room. Typical elapsed times were between 15 and 30 minutes just to inform the broker.

=== Quotron ===
Jack Scantlin of Scantlin Electronics, Inc. (SEI) developed the Quotron I system, consisting of a magnetic tape storage unit that could be sited at a brokerage and Desk Units with a keyboard and printer. The storage unit recorded the data from the ticker line. Brokers could enter the stock symbol on a desk unit. This triggered a backward search on the magnetic tape (which continued recording incoming ticker data). When a transaction was located, the price was sent to the desk unit, which printed it on a tape.

The first Quotron units were installed in 1960, and were an immediate success. By the end of 1961 brokers were leasing Quotrons in some 800 offices, serving some 2,500 desk units across the United States.

=== Ultronics vs. Quotron ===
Quotron's success attracted the attention of Robert S. Sinn, who observed its disadvantages: it could only give a last price. The opening price, high and low for the day, and share volume were not available. His system received the ticker transmissions from the various stock and commodity exchanges. These were then automatically interpreted by a hard wired digital computer updating a drum memory with the last sale prices and at the same time computing and updating highs and lows and total volume for each stock. As these items were updated a data packet would be generated for transmission by AT&T Dataphone at 1000 bits/second to identical magnetic drum storage devices in each major city in the United States. These slave drum memory units located in the metropolitan centers in the US could then be accessed by desk units in local stock brokerage offices again using Dataphone transmission. The desk units would set up the ticker symbol code for the desired stock by mechanical means actuating micro switches. The local control box would continuously interrogate each desk unit in sequence and send a request data packet by Dataphone to the local drum memory which would then send return data packets back to the local brokerage office. Each packet both for request and answer would contain the request stock alphabetic symbols plus a desk unit identifier. Because the desk units set up the requested stock code statically the desk unit would automatically update the stock price, volume, and highs and lows without any operator intervention because the control unit could complete the interrogation of all desk units in the office in about every one or two seconds, This is the first use of data packet transmission with the sender's identification imbedded in the data packet in order to avoid switching- a forerunner of the internet? There was no switching in the entire system; all was done with data packets containing sender identifiers.

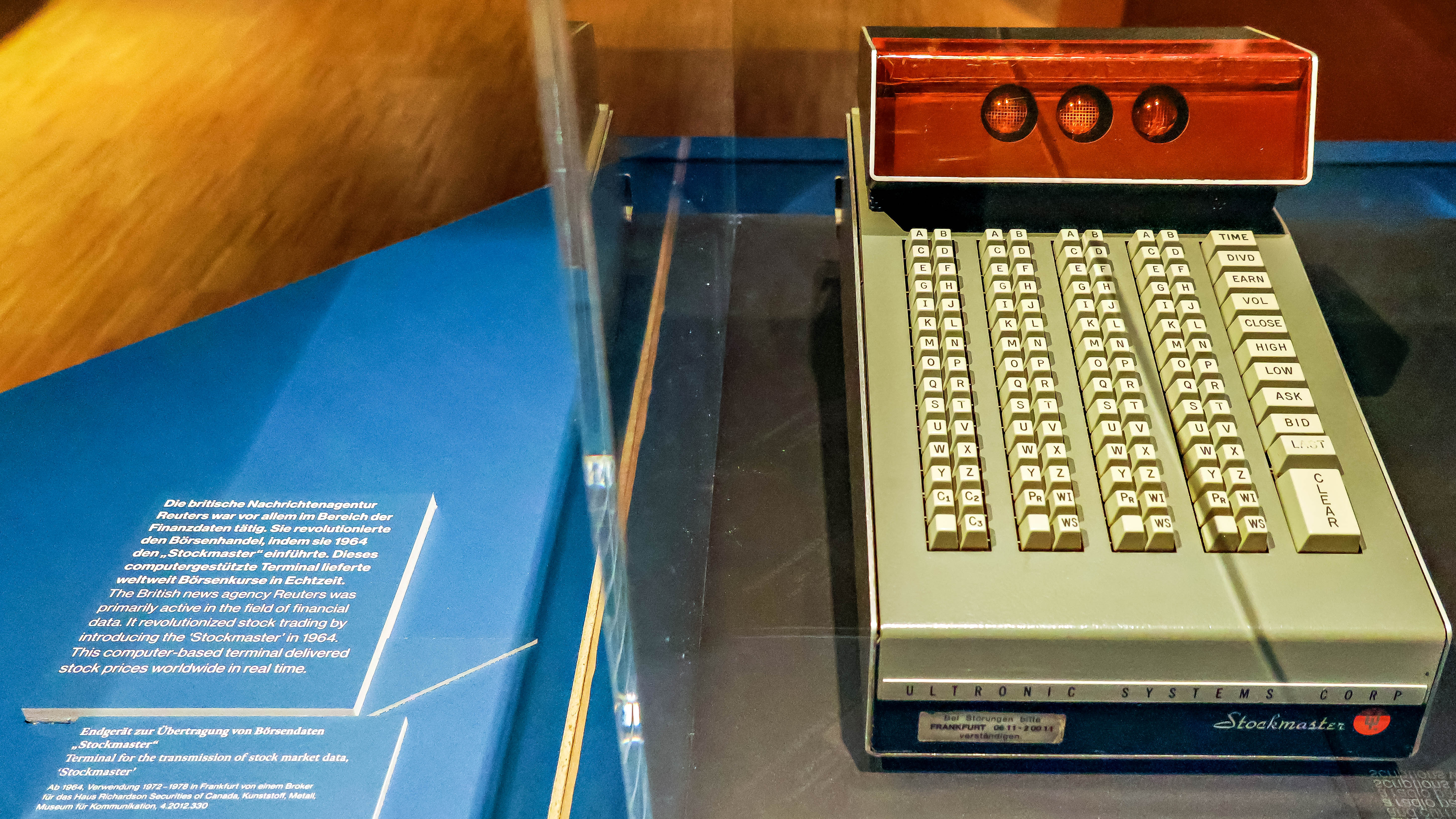
Stockmaster by Ultronic Systems Corp.

Sinn formed Ultronic Systems Corp. in December 1960, and was president and CEO from then until he left the company in 1970. By the fall of 1961 Ultronics had installed its first desk units (Stockmaster) in New York and Philadelphia, followed by San Francisco and Los Angeles. The Stockmaster desk units offered the user quick access and continuous monitoring of last sale, bid, ask, high, low, total volume, open, close, earnings, and dividends for each stock on the NYSE and the AMEX plus commodities from the various U.S. commodity exchanges. Ultimately Ultronics and General Telephone (which bought Ultronics in 1967) installed some 10,000 units world-wide. In June 1964 Ultronics and the British news company Reuters signed a joint venture agreement to market Stockmaster worldwide outside of North America. This venture lasted for 10 years and was very successful, capturing the worldwide market for U.S. stock and commodity price information. Ultronics invented time division multiplex equipment to utilize Reuters' voice grade lines to Europe and the Far East to transmit U.S. stock and commodity information plus Reuters' teletype news channels.

In the early 1960s when these first desk top quotation units were developed the only real time information available from the various stock and commodity exchanges were the last sale and the bid and ask ticker lines. The last sale ticker contained every trade with both price and volume for each trade. The bid-ask ticker contained only the two prices and no size. The volume of data on the last sale ticker was therefore much greater than on the bid-ask ticker. Because of this, on high volume days the last sale ticker would run as much as fifteen minutes behind the bid-ask ticker. This time difference made having the bid-ask on their desk top unit extremely important to a stockbroker even though there was an extra charge to the exchange for this information.

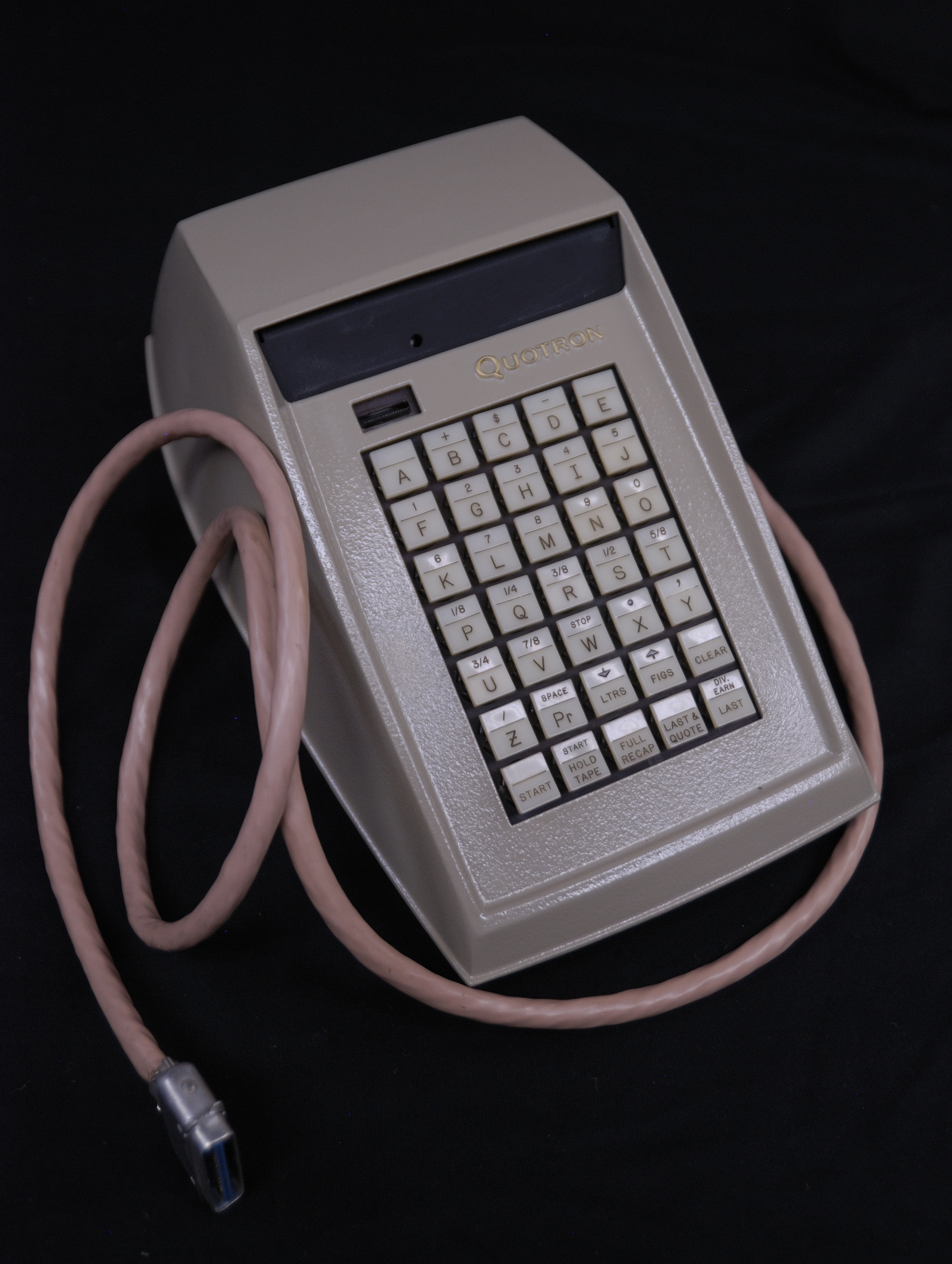
Quotron II Desk Unit.

Scantlin Electronics reacted immediately to the Ultronic threat. In early 1962 they began work on their own computer-based system and put it into service in December, 1962. It used four Control Data CDC 160A computers in New York which recorded trading data in magnetic core memory. Major cities hosted Central Office equipment connected to newly designed Quotron II desk units in brokerage offices on which a broker could request, for any stock, price and net change from the opening, or a summary which included highs, lows, and volumes (later SEI added other features like dividends and earnings). The requests went to a Central Office, which condensed and forwarded them to the New York computer. Replies followed the sequence in reverse. The data was transmitted on AT&T's Dataphone high-speed telephone service. In 1963 the new system was accepted by many brokers, and was installed in hundreds of their offices.

At the end of each day, this same system transmitted stock market pages to United Press International, which in turn sold them to its newspaper customers all over the world.

When Ultronics introduced their Stockmaster desk units in 1961 they priced the service at approximately the same price as the Quotron desk units. They did not want a price competition only a performance competition. All of these stock quote devices were sold on leases with monthly rental charges. The cost of the system, desk units and installation was therefore born solely by the vendor not the customer (broker). The pricing at that time made the units quite profitable and allowed the companies to finance the cost and use rapid accounting depreciation of the equipment. In 1964 Teleregister introduced their Telequote desk units at prices significantly less than Stockmaster or Quotron. This forced Ultronics and Scantlin to reduce the prices of their Stockmaster and Quotron systems. The Telequote desk units never did gain a significant share of the desk top quotation business, but their price cutting did seriously reduce the overall profitability of this business in the U.S.. Ultronics was fortunate to have made the joint venture arrangement with Reuters for the stock quotation business outside of North America where this price cutting was not a factor.

The 1962 Cuban Missile Crisis blocked Ultronics from winning a historic first. In July 1962 AT&T launched the first commercial satellite (Telstar) to transmit television and telephone voice channels between the U.S. and England and France. This was a non-synchronous satellite which circled the earth in an elliptical orbit of about 2.5 hours, such that it gave only about 20 minutes of communication between the U.S. and Europe on each pass. Ultronics arranged with AT&T to use one of its voice channels to transmit U.S. stock prices to Paris in October 1962. All of the arrangements were made-a Stockmaster unit was installed in the Bache brokerage office on Rue Royale and all of the American Stockbrokers and the press and television were ready for this historic event. About two hours before the pass the stock transmission was cancelled because U.S. president John Kennedy was going to use the pass to send his speech to France concerning the Cuban missile crisis.

=== Am-Quote ===
In 1964 Teleregister introduced the Am-Quote system with which a broker could enter code numbers into a standard telephone; a second later a pleasant (prerecorded) voice repeated the code numbers and provided the required price information. This system, like Ultronics', made use of magnetic drums.

=== Computerized quoting ===
NASDAQ, founded in 1972 was the first electronic stock market. It was originally designed only as an electronic quotation system, with no ability to perform electronic trades. Other systems soon followed and by the turn of the century, every exchange was using this model.

== See also ==
- Stock Market
- Stock trader
- Stock Exchange
- Financial data vendor
- Electronic trading
- Securities
- Stockbrokers
- Ticker tape
- Trading room
