= Carolines =

Carolines may refer to:

- Caroline Islands, an archipelago in the western Pacific Ocean, part of Micronesia and Palau
- Carolines on Broadway, a venue for stand-up comedy in New York, New York

== See also ==
- Carolinas, a region of the United States
