= Money.Net =

American financial company

- Industry: Financial Data
- Founded: 1999
- Founder: Harold Louis Van Arnem IV
- Headquarters: New York City, New York, US
- Key people: Vincent Sangiovanni, CEO
- Website: www.money.net

Money.Net Inc is a privately held financial data technology company and financial data vendor based in New York City.

== History ==
Money.Net provides real-time live streaming financial market information such as prices, breaking financial news, technical analysis charts, trade idea generation tools, and a spreadsheet API over the internet to individual traders and institutional trading floors. The product coverage is global, and is multi-asset class, including equities, fixed income, foreign exchange and commodities. It also includes reference fundamental market data such as economic statistics and corporate actions.

The Money.Net product provides "access to real-time market data and trends for a sliver of what" traditional market data terminals cost.

Money.Net is a cloud-based platform for market data. According to current CEO Morgan Downey, Money.Net has about 50,000 paying subscribers. It is one of the several cloud-based Financial Technology (FinTech) companies challenging dominant vendors in financial markets. The product is available as a desktop application, via mobile devices, and through an excel spreadsheet API.

In late 2016, the company announced that it had hired former Bloomberg Chief Content Officer, Norman Pearlstine, to develop a new financial news division relying heavily on artificial intelligence.

== See also ==
- Eikon
- Bloomberg Terminal
- Financial market
- Financial technology
- Market data
- Stock market
