= Quotron =

American financial data technology company

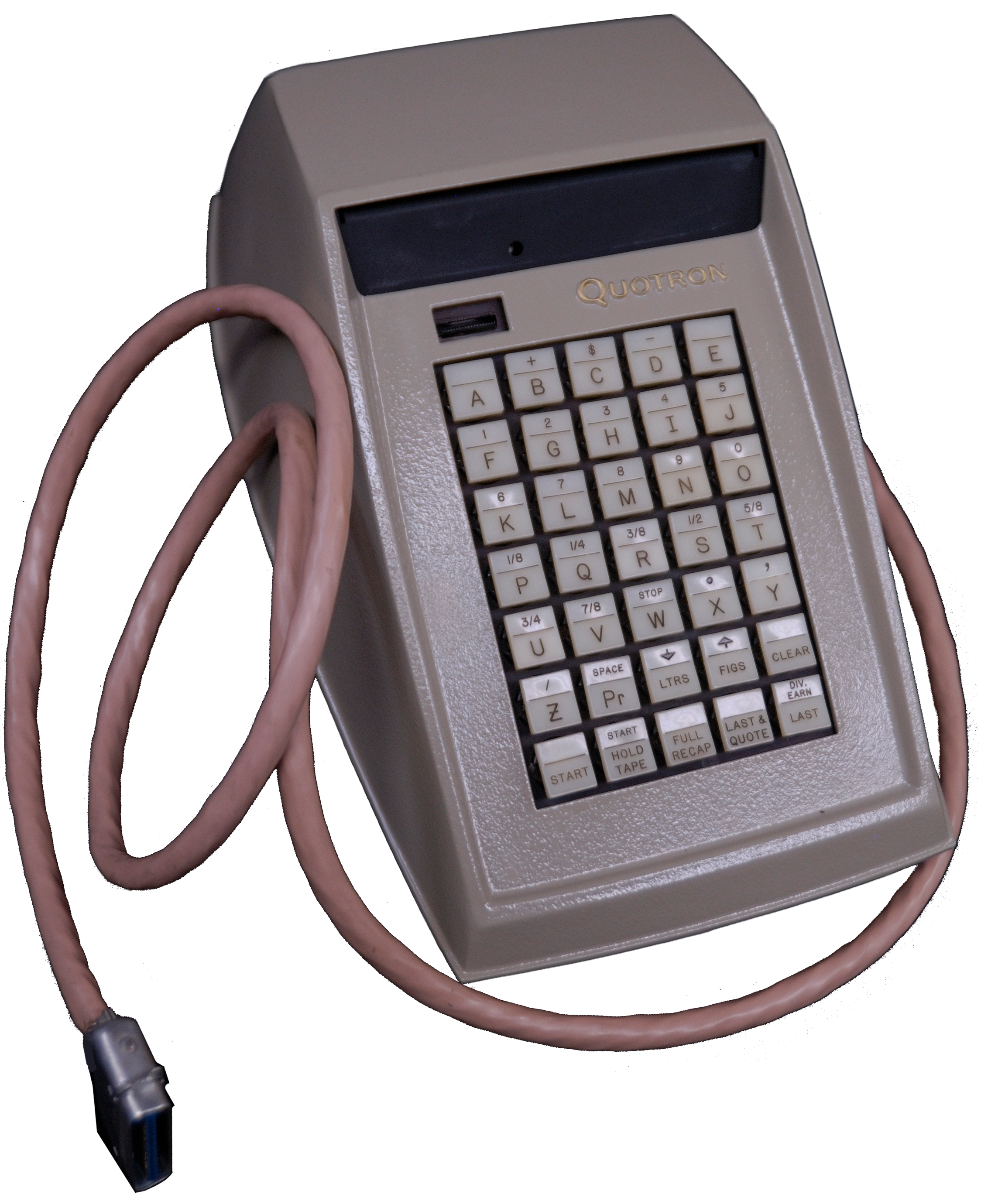
Quotron II Desk Unit

Quotron was a Los Angeles–based company that in 1960 became the first financial data technology company to deliver stock market quotes to an electronic screen rather than on a printed ticker tape. The Quotron offered brokers and money managers up-to-the-minute prices and other information about securities. The Quotron was developed by Scantlin Electronics, owned by entrepreneur John Scantlin. Scantlin had earlier developed a quotation device that used magnetic tape instead of ticker tape. Quotron's first major competitor was Telerate, which was founded by Neil Hirsch in 1969 and later bought by Dow Jones in 1990.

Citicorp bought Quotron in 1986. At the time Quotron was renting 100,000 terminals which equated to 60 percent of the 1986 market for financial data. Following the Citicorp acquisition, Quotron's largest client, brokerage house Merrill Lynch, decided not to renew their contract with Quotron. Merrill Lynch instead invested in a competing startup named Bloomberg.

Most computer screens in the 1980s were able to display text in a single color. Quotron screens had green text on a black background. The Quotron was the screen used by Charlie Sheen's Bud Fox and Michael Douglas's Gordon Gekko characters in the 1987 movie Wall Street. When the Bloomberg professional terminal launched for bond traders it had amber text on a black background.

Quotron did not keep pace with developments in technology and the company was slow to move from a dedicated terminal to personal computers, as the proprietary Bloomberg Terminal overtook its market share. By 1994 Quotron had only 35,000 terminals compared with 80,000 for Automatic Data Processing and 25,000 for ILX, according to Waters Information Services. Citicorp lost money on Quotron every year and, in 1994, paid Reuters Holdings P.L.C. more than $100 million to purchase the ailing Quotron. Quotron then became Reuters' trading floor terminal, until it was superseded by the Reuters 3000 Xtra and Triarch platform. Thomson Reuters and Bloomberg lead the trading floor terminal space today with 70% of the market.In early 2023, Quotron has been revitalized by a group of tech entrepreneurs that have started developing modern stock tickers for individuals traders.

== See also ==
- Stock market data systems
