= Work to Ride =

American nonprofit prevention program

Work to Ride (WTR) is an American nonprofit prevention program which seeks to aid disadvantaged urban youth (ages 7 to 19) by offering constructive activities including horsemanship, equine sports (Polo) and education. The program was founded in 1994 by Lezlie Hiner. This program's goal is to inspire inner-city youth with limited opportunities in positive ways through the sport of polo. From tending to horses, the stable and the farm daily, the children will learn how to work for the privileges that Lezlie provides. The "Family" polo team will compete against other scholastic polo teams which teaches the children about teamwork, perseverance and much more.

WTR is based at Chamounix Stables in Fairmount Park, Philadelphia, and gives urban teenagers a chance to come in contact with animals and nature. Children and teens who want to be involved must commit to a minimum of one year of participation in the program; participants are encouraged to remain with the program through their high school graduation. WTR graduates receive assistance with college enrollment; a few also choose to come back to Chamounix and act as mentors to teens entering the program.

In 2011, WTR became the first all-black squad to win the United States Polo Association's national interscholastic championship. The members of the original championship team were Kareem Rosser, Daymar Rosser and Brandon Rease; Kareem Rosser described his own time in Work to Ride in his 2021 book Crossing the Line. Work to Ride repeated as national champions in 2012.

Work to Ride has received national attention and funding from Polo Ralph Lauren. Hiner was awarded the United States Polo Association "Woman of the Year" award in 2016 in recognition of her contribution to the sport through WTR.
