= Stand Up for Heroes =

Annual benefit concert festival

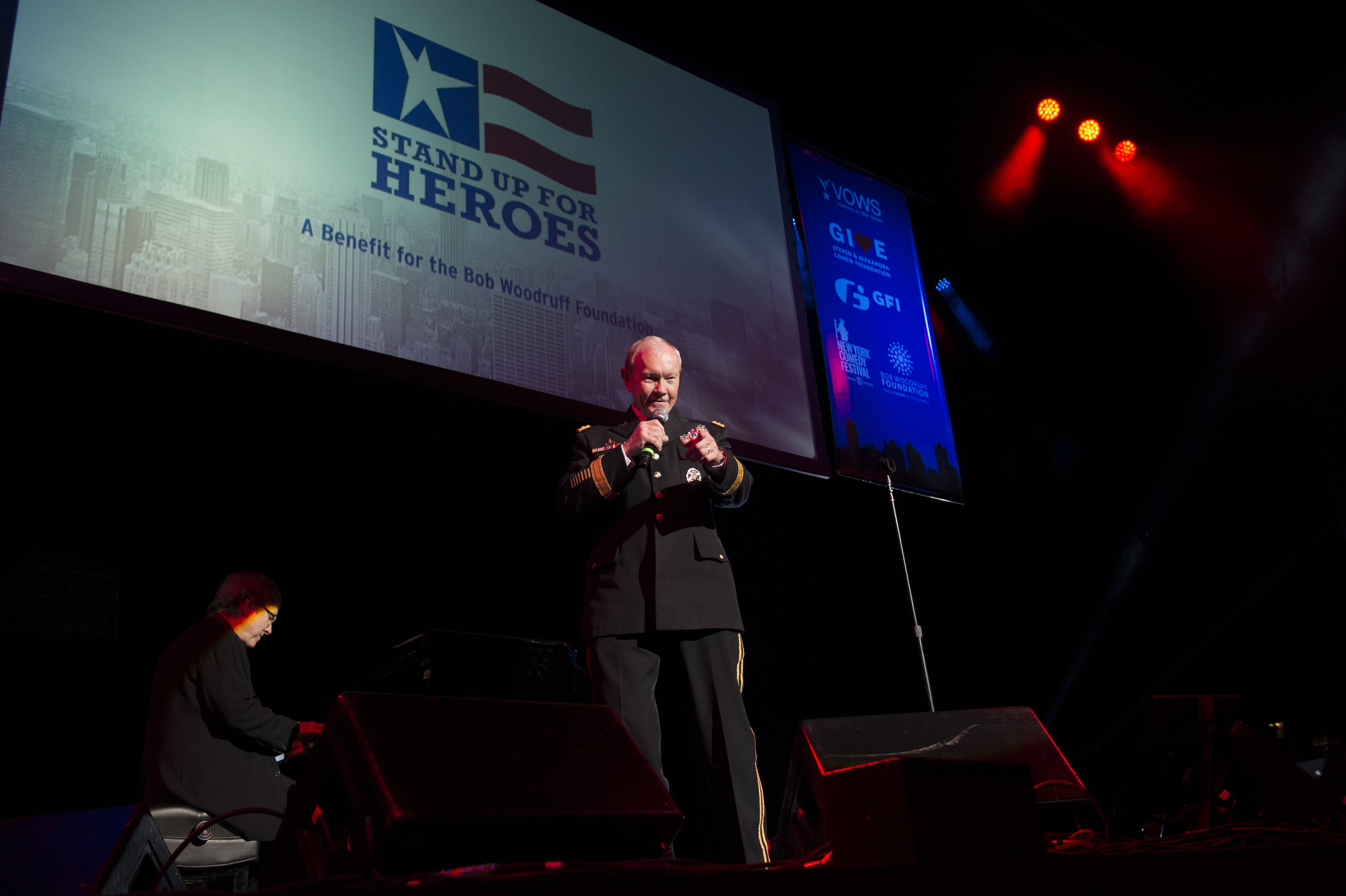
- Chairman of the Joint Chiefs of Staff Gen. Martin E. Dempsey sings onstage at Stand Up for Heroes on Nov. 5, 2014
- Genre: Comedy; Rock and Roll
- Dates: November 2007; 19 years ago
- Locations: Hulu Theater inside Madison Square Garden, New York City, NY United States
- Years active: 13
- Founders: Bob Woodruff, Caroline Hirsch, Lee Woodruff & Andrew Fox
- Website: bobwoodrufffoundation.org

Stand Up for Heroes is annual benefit concert/comedy festival, started in 2007, that benefits the Bob Woodruff Foundation, which supports charities and runs programs benefitting veterans. The benefit usually kicks off New York Comedy Festival, and was started by Festival founders Caroline Hirsch and Andrew Fox and Foundation founders Bob Woodruff and Lee Woodruff. The event takes place yearly at the Hulu Theater inside Madison Square Garden, although it was originally held at the Beacon Theatre and The Town Hall, both in New York City. As of 2019, the event has raised $55 million for the foundation.

== History ==
Bob Woodruff started the annual concert after being seriously wounded in Iraq in 2006, while covering the war on terror and the Iraq War. The concert features a mix of musicians, comedians and other celebrities and entertainers. While the list changes from year, Bruce Springsteen has performed at every event. The concert often features celebrity auctions to raise money for the foundation.

== Featured performers ==
Over its 13-year run, the concert has featured:

- Jerry Seinfeld
- Jim Gaffigan
- Seth Meyers
- Conan O'Brien
- Robin Williams
- John Oliver
- Stephen Colbert
- Jon Stewart
- Hasan Minhaj
- Sheryl Crow
- Mickey Guyton
- Tiffany Haddish
- Iliza Shlesinger
- Roger Waters
- Jimmy Carr

== See also ==
- List of highest-grossing benefit concerts
