= Nacho Figueras =

Argentine polo player (born 1977)

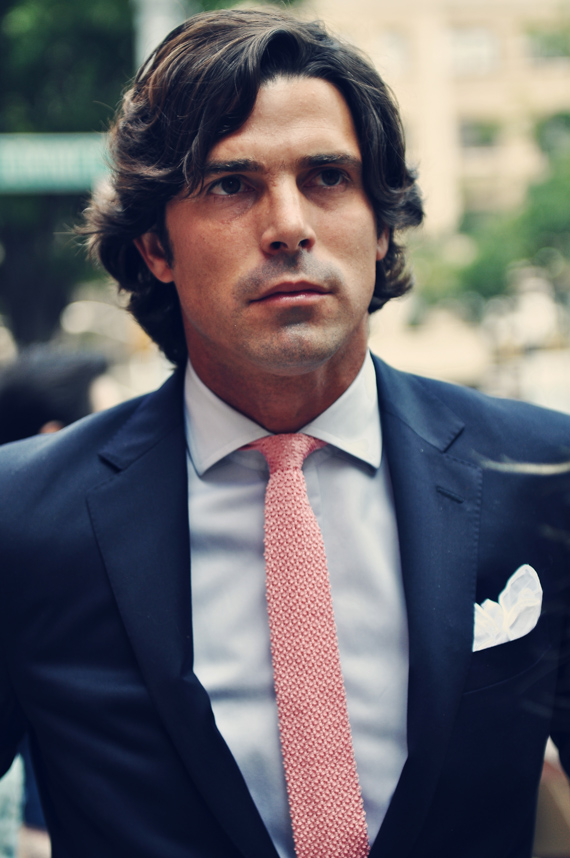
- Figueras in 2011
- Born: Ignacio Figueras Bermejo; March 4, 1977 (age 49); Venticinco de Mayo, Buenos Aires Province, Argentina
- Occupations: Polo player; model
- Years active: 1994–present
- Spouse: Delfina Blaquier (m. 2004)
- Children: 4
- Sports career
- Sport: Polo
- Rank: 6-goal handicap
- Team: BlackWatch Polo Team

Ignacio "Nacho" Figueras Bermejo (Spanish: [iɣˈnasjo fiˈɣeɾas βeɾˈmexo], born March 4, 1977) is an Argentine polo player and model with a 6-goal handicap. Dubbed the "David Beckham of polo", Figueras is considered to be the most famous polo player in the world. He currently co-owns and plays for Black Watch Polo Team. Since 2005, Figueras has been the face of Ralph Lauren's Black Label. In 2015, models.com ranked him in the top eighteen of their Money Men.

== Early life ==
Ignacio Figueras Bermejo was born on March 4, 1977, in Veinticinco de Mayo, Buenos Aires. He was raised in a middle-class family on a small farm outside the city. His father was close friends with polo player Lucas Monteverde. Figueras began playing polo at age 9 with Monteverde during weekend visits to his estate. At the age of 14, he moved into Monteverde's estate so he could ride horses daily and take polo more seriously.

== Polo ==
Figueras began playing polo professionally in Paris at age 17. "I was my own groom," Figueras spoke of the experience, "I would take care of the horses and then go play in the matches. It was a low-budget gig." In Bridgehampton, New York he joined White Birch, a team shared at the time by Peter Brant and Neil Hirsch. He currently plays for and is captain of the BlackWatch Polo Team, a team he co-owns with Hirsch.

== Modeling ==
When he was approached by the photographer Bruce Weber 12 years ago, at a dinner party held by Kelly Klein, ex-wife of Calvin, in The Hamptons, he hoped modelling might help him buy ponies. "Then I realised that I could make extra money, and raise awareness of the sport." Nacho started modelling for Ralph Lauren in 2000, eventually becoming the face of Ralph Lauren Black Label in 2005, and has been under contract since. In May 2009, he was made the face of the World of Polo fragrances, including Polo Black, Polo Blue and Polo Modern Reserve. Black Watch is also a label under the Ralph Lauren umbrella, offering tight polo shirts emblazoned with Nacho's number 2, an idea of Figueras' to make it a billion-dollar brand.

In June 2009, he was voted the second most handsome man in the world by the readers of Vanity Fair magazine with 15% of the vote, far behind Robert Pattinson, who drew 51%, and ahead of Brad Pitt, who drew 12%.

Despite his success in the modeling arena, polo continues to be his passion. He says his mission in life "is to bring polo to the world a little more," doing his best to raise the profile to the sport of polo however he can. To that end, he has helped organize matches such as the Veuve Clicquot Manhattan Polo Classic exhibition in Governor's Island, New York; the edition on June 27, 2010, also featured Britain's Prince Harry. In October 2010, Nacho Figueras co-hosted the Veuve Clicquot Polo Classic with Cameron Silver in Los Angeles at Will Rogers state park attracting celebrities and socialites like Minnie Driver, Mischa Barton, Donovan Leitch and Rachel Zoe.

He appeared as himself in the 44th episode of the CW television series Gossip Girl, third-season premiere "Reversals of fortune", aired in 2009. On September 28, 2009, Figueras was a guest on The Oprah Winfrey Show in Chicago. The show was titled "Meet the Most Famous People in the World". In one of the segments on the show, Nacho gave Oprah's reporter Ali Wentworth a private polo lesson. Nacho Figueras also makes frequent appearances in The Ellen DeGeneres Show TV show as he is a great friend of the host Ellen DeGeneres.

== Personal life ==
Figueras married fellow Argentine Delfina Blaquier, a photographer and former model, in 2004. The couple have four children, Hilario born in 2000, Aurora born in 2005, Artemio born in 2010 and Alba born in 2013.

== Filmography ==
=== Film ===
Year	Title	Role	Notes	Ref.
2009	The Polo Kid	Himself	Documentary	
2010	13	Handler #3		

=== Television ===
Year	Title	Role	Notes	Ref.
2009	Late Night with Jimmy Fallon	Himself		
2009	Gossip Girl	Himself	Episode: "Reversals of Fortune"	
2010	Entertainment Tonight	Himself		
2010	E:60	Himself	Segment: "Nacho Figueras"	
2011	Conan	Polo Tutor	Episode: "Eat, Love, Lather, Rinse, Repeat"	
2012	60 Minutes	Himself	Segment: "The Sport of Kings"	
2012–2019	CBS This Morning	Himself	4 episodes	
2012	Home & Family	Himself	Guest	
2013	Good Day L.A.	Himself		
2013	Chelsea Lately	Himself	Guest	
2013	Pura Química	Himself	Guest	
2014	The Real	Himself	Episode: "Sheila E./Nacho Figueras"	
2016	American Latino TV	Himself	Guest	
2017–2021	The Ellen DeGeneres Show	Himself	4 episodes	
2018	Good Morning America	Himself	Guest	
2024	Polo	Himself	5 episodes	
