= Telerate =

American financial data corporation

Telerate was a US company providing financial data to market participants, specialising in commercial paper and bond prices. It was a pioneer in the electronic distribution of real-time market information in the 1970s. With its main innovation being to extend the technology that was used to obtain live stock prices, via Telequote, Quotron or Stockmaster to other sectors of the financial industry, such as corporate debt, currencies, interest rates and commodities.

The company was founded by Neil Hirsch and it became a major provider of market data through the 1970s and 1980s. The company was bought by Dow Jones & Company in 1990 but the hedonistic lifestyle of its founders and senior manager clashed with the strait-laced culture of Dow Jones & Company causing issues within Dow Jones. Dow Jones' aim was to use Telerate to compete against market dominant Reuters. However, Dow Jones lost focus and the business was eventually consigned to the backwater of the business. It was sold a number of times and renamed Bridge Telerate and later Moneyline Telerate.

Reuters eventually bought the remains of Telerate in 2005. This saw the end of the company as Reuters absorbed the business into its own market data unit. It also lost numerous customers as many clients chose Telerate as an alternative to Reuters, and they were not happy to have those products now under Reuters’ roof. Some customers had also had advantageous deals from Telerate, and Reuters was not happy to renew them on those terms.

== History ==
=== Early years ===
The company was founded in 1969 by Neil Hirsch, a 21-year-old who had been hired by the U.S. broker Merrill Lynch, with two million of venture capital.

Neil Hirsch later attracted new investors, including Bernie Cantor, owner of a government securities broker Cantor Fitzgerald. The company saw strong growth because of the innovative technology and relatively low costs of the service compared to main rivals. However, the success and new wealth allowed Neil Hirsch to indulge in what was described by Telerate insider John Jessop "as a hedonistic lifestyle that involved drugs and alcohol in quantities that some observers saw as life-threatening".

Co-owner Bernie Cantor attracted much early controversy by using Telerate as a vehicle for advertising his company's trading prices, the first broker to do so, attracting the anger of many of its customers including such Wall Street giants as Merrill Lynch, Bankers Trust and Chemical Bank.

By 1971, the company was prepared for an IPO, but before that was completed it was contacted by the bond broker Cantor Fitzgerald in 1972 which took a 25% share of its capital.

By the mid 1970s Telerate had a monopoly on the information on the price of U.S. treasury bonds, and in 1977 the company made a profit of $1 million. Cantor Fitzgerald increased its stake to 70%. That same year Telerate entered into an alliance with Associated Press and the Dow Jones & Company to create a joint venture called AP-Dow Jones.

In 1981, while Telerate addresses the market for financial information internationally, it faced strong competition from the market dominant Reuters. Cantor Fitzgerald decided to sell its 89% stake, and it was sold to British investment group Exco International for $75 million. With the rest of the capital remaining in the hands of company management. That year Telerate made a net profit of $13.6 million. Customers typically paid $540–$700 per month for each terminal and 8,000 terminals were installed in North America, plus an additional 2,500 in 21 countries.

=== Association with Dow Jones ===
In the spring of 1983, three months after its IPO, Telerate created a subsidiary called AP-Dow Jones Telerate Co. for its international activities that held 49.9%, while Associated Press and Dow Jones and Company possessed 25.05%. The company's main competitor Reuters grew in popularity, which saw a collapse in the Telerate share price in the autumn of 1984. Neil S. Hirsch complained that the company was undervalued. The company came under pressure to launch "Telerate II", software that could run on IBM PCs.

Dow Jones & Company and Associated Press developed an integrated service that could be delivered over Telerate and Quotron technology to rival Reuters services. Within the financial community "club" Reuters opposed "club" Telerate which developed into a technology race between the two camps.

Dow Jones and Company acquired a 32% stake in 1985 for $285 million, valuing Telerate at $800 million, then reinvested $415 million for up to 56% in September 1987, just before the stock market crash October 1987. Despite this Dow Jones continued to invest in the business and invested another $148 million the next year taking its share to 67%. Telerate then launched the Matrix system in response to Reuters "Advanced Reuters Terminal (ART)" service.

The needs of traders and portfolio managers were however neglected by both "Reuters" and "Dow Jones Telerate" which allowed a new niche financial data provider, Bloomberg to start taking market share with its Bloomberg terminal. Within Dow Jones, Telerate was gradually marginalized and the services were eventually integrated with those of Dow Jones Newswire.

=== End of the company ===
In 1998 Bridge Information Systems, then the fourth largest provider of market information services behind Reuters, Dow Jones, and Bloomberg, agreed to buy the troubled Telerate business from Dow Jones for $510 million. The Dow Jones board had urged the sale despite taking a significant loss due what it perceived as insurmountable competition from its two biggest rivals, Reuters and Bloomberg, particularly as Telerate lacked the more complex historical pricing information and other analytical software that investors were looking for. Bridge Information Systems faced competition in the acquisition from Cantor Fitzgerald which was interested in re-acquiring interest in the business. However, the sale was completed with Bridge, and it was renamed Bridge Telerate.

In 2001, Bridge Telerate was sold to MoneyLine Network as part of the Bridge Information Systems bankruptcy proceedings for just $10 million. As part of the deal, MoneyLine reached an agreement with Reuters for the collection and aggregation of market data and other services for a three to four year transition period. It also reached an agreement with SAVVIS Communications Corporation for network services, so that it could continue to offer Telerate services. The business was renamed MoneyLine Telerate. However, the relationship with Reuters was troublesome and would lead to a major dispute with Reuters in 2003 when Reuters threatened to cut Telerate's data feeds, which was only narrowly avoided.

The business continued to decline, and by 2005 the company was no longer publicly traded and was now majority owned by One Equity Partners, the domestic venture capital arm of JPMorgan Chase. In June of that year, One Equity Partners sold the remains of the Moneyline Telerate business to Reuters for approximately $175 million. This saw the end of the Telerate brand as Reuters absorbed the business into its own market data unit.
