= New York Comedy Festival =

The New York Comedy Festival is an annual comedy festival founded by Caroline Hirsch and launched in November 2004. The week-long festival is produced by Carolines and held each year in November. It features more than 200 comedians performing in more than 150 shows throughout all five boroughs of New York City. The festival has featured performances by some of the biggest stars in comedy, including Bill Maher, Ricky Gervais, Andy Samberg, Mike Birbiglia, Tracy Morgan, Artie Lange, Mike Epps, and Dane Cook.

The festival's kick-off event is Stand Up for Heroes a benefit for the Bob Woodruff Foundation.

After being canceled in 2020 due to the COVID-19 pandemic, the festival returned in November 2021 with more than 150 shows.
