= Bridge Information Systems =

Financial news and data provider, 1974–2001

Bridge Information Systems, Inc., was a financial news and data provider that was acquired by Reuters Group in September 2001.

== History ==
The origins of Bridge date to 1974, when the original company was founded in St. Louis by investment analysts through acquisition of a computer firm from Dean Witter & Co. Principal founder Charles A. Lebens thought that the development of new time-sensitive investments and financial industry deregulation would create a market for up-to-date financial information. In March 1995, Bridge was acquired by private equity firm Welsh, Carson, Anderson & Stowe. "Global Financial Information Corp." was the entity formed from Bridge and several other companies combined by Welsh, but the entire concern named "Bridge Information Systems" in September 1996. It also moved its headquarters to New York.

Bridge's acquisition of ten companies starting in 1996 under new CEO Tom Wendel, starting with Knight Ridder Financial News for $275 million, created significant debt burdens for the company. Bridge also bought the Telerate unit of Dow Jones & Company in 1998 in return for $150 million of preferred stock.

As of May 2000 the company had 5,000 employees (a ten-fold growth from five years prior); half were located in the United States, and six hundred reporters were spread over 100 countries. One thousand employees were located at the company's headquarters in New York, and 800 were in St. Louis (its original headquarters).

Unable to meet its ongoing debt obligations, Bridge filed for bankruptcy in February 2001. The purchase of the company by Reuters was finalized by the end of September.
