= Caroline Hirsch =

American businesswoman and comedy club owner

- Born: 1952 (age 73–74); United States
- Occupation: Comedy club owner

Caroline Hirsch is the founder and was the owner of the New York comedy club Carolines on Broadway. She is also the founder and owner of the New York Comedy Festival.

== Early life ==
Hirsch was born in 1952, and grew up in Flatbush, Brooklyn. She says the first standup act she ever saw was when she snuck into a 1967 George Carlin gig at The Bitter End in Greenwich Village. After living in Brooklyn, she later moved to Manhattan. She attended City College and the Fashion Institute of Technology (FIT). After school, she went to work at Gimbels until she became unemployed.

== Career ==
While Hirsch was collecting unemployment, a few friends approached her about opening up a cabaret, an offer which she eventually accepted. The club opened in 1982, but she realized that the cabaret theme was not working and decided to turn it into a comedy club instead, which brought in a younger clientele that was more profitable. In the late '80s, the A&E network asked her to produce a comedy special, which became Caroline's Comedy Hour, produced by her production company, Pinky Ring Productions. The show won a CableACE Award for Best Stand-Up Comedy Series.

In November 2004, with Jarrod Moses,, Hirsch launched the New York Comedy Festival (NYCF), a weeklong event that features the industry's biggest stars performing in New York’s most prestigious venues, including Carnegie Hall, Lincoln Center, the Apollo Theater, Madison Square Garden, The Town Hall, and Carolines on Broadway.

== Charity work ==
Hirsch serves as a board member of the Creative Coalition and implemented the highly successful "Stand-Up for Class" program in both the New York City and Los Angeles public school systems. She is also a board member of the Times Square Alliance (formerly the Times Business Improvement District); NYC & Company, the city’s official tourism marketing organization; the board of The Association for the Help of Retarded Children; and the national advisory board of Count Me In, a microlending organization for women. Additionally, she formerly sat on the board of the Ms. Foundation for Women, during which time she created the successful Take Our Daughters to Work Day initiative.

In 2006, Hirsch produced Roasted, Battered and Fried, a roast of Mario Batali to benefit the Food Bank For New York City, which took place at Capitale as part the third annual New York Comedy Festival. In 2007, Hirsch created Stand Up for Heroes to benefit the Bob Woodruff Foundation, an annual event that takes place during the NYCF and which has featured performances by Bill Cosby, Ricky Gervais, John Mayer, Jerry Seinfeld, Jon Stewart, Bruce Springsteen, and Roger Waters, among others. To date, Stand Up for Heroes has raised more than $20 million. In 2011, Hirsch produced On the Chopping Block: A Roast of Anthony Bourdain as part of the New York City Wine & Food Festival. The event helped raise money for the Food Bank For New York City and Share Our Strength's "No Kid Hungry" campaign.

== Awards and honors ==
Hirsch was honored with the New York Police Athletic League's Woman of the Year Award, the Ms. Foundation for Women’s Philanthropic Vision Award, and the National Association of Women Business Owners’ Signature Award for Lifetime Achievement. She also received the Leadership in Tourism Award from the NYC & Company Foundation. In 2011, Hirsch was the recipient of Variety 's Comedy Legend & Groundbreaker Award and in 2013 was named as one of Crain’s New York Business's "Movers & Shakers."
