= BlackWatch Polo Team =

- Association: NAPL
- Head coach: Daniel Gonzales
- Captain: Nacho Figueras

The Black Watch Polo team has won numerous tournaments throughout the US. Entering competition at the high goal 26 level in 2004, Black Watch has enjoyed success by reaching the finals of the 2004 US Gold Cup, and the 2005 CV Whitney Cup. They were also successful in winning the 2007 Hall of Fame Cup.

Neil Hirsch, the team patron, was an American businessman and resided in Wellington, Florida. The team was sponsored by Ralph Lauren.

== History ==
The team is named after the Scottish Black Watch regiment that served the British Crown for 266 years.

Team formed by:

- Bautista Heguy
- Nacho Figueras
- Matias MacDonough
- Francisco De Narvaez (Jr)

== Achievements ==
2004	2004 Mercedes Polo Challenge, Bridgehampton, New York	Champions (won 12-10 v White Birch)
2007	2007 Hall of Fame Cup, Wellington, Florida, USA	Champions (won 12-10 v Palladyn Rally)

== See also ==
- Polo
