= Bridgehampton Polo Club =

Bridgehampton Polo Club is a polo club in Bridgehampton, New York founded in the 1990s. It is most widely known as the host club for the Mercedes-Benz Polo Challenge at Two Trees Farm, generally held in July of each year.

The Club is open for six consecutive Saturdays each year between July and August for public viewing.

The Club colours are navy and white.
