= Carolines on Broadway =

New York comedy venue

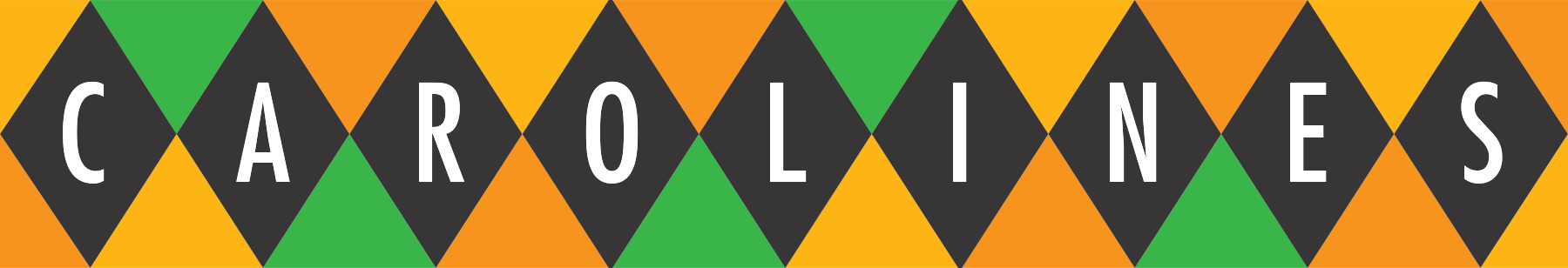

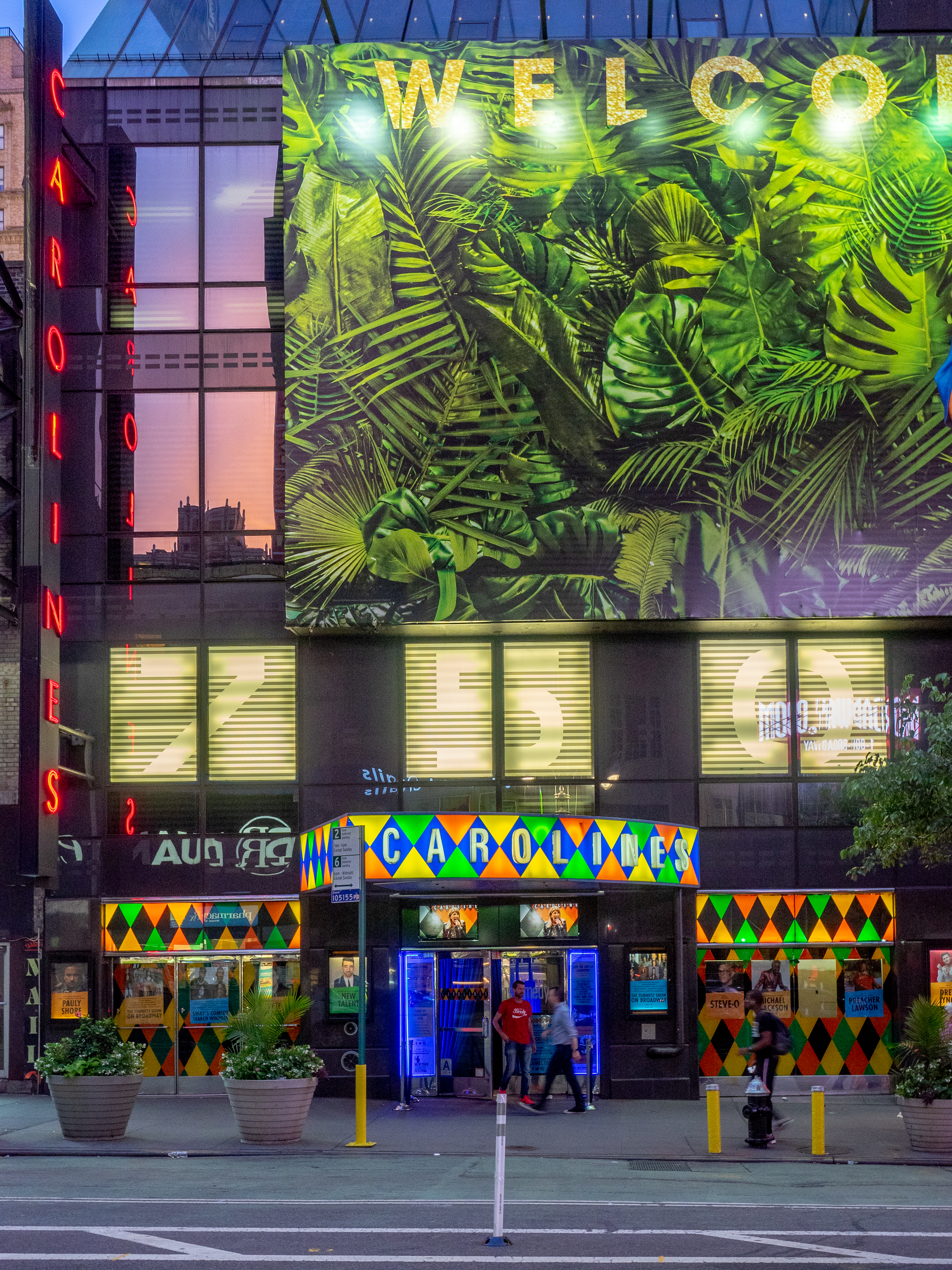
- Interactive map of Carolines on Broadway
- Address: 1626 Broadway
- Location: New York City, New York
- Coordinates: 40.7610°N 73.9840°W
- Owner: Caroline Hirsch
- Capacity: 280
- Type: Comedy nightclub

Construction
- Opened: 1981
- Closed: 2022

Website
- carolines.com

Carolines on Broadway was a venue for stand-up comedy situated at 750 Seventh Avenue, on Broadway between 49th and 50th Streets, in the Midtown Manhattan neighborhood of New York City. The club operated from 1981 to 2022.

== History ==
Caroline Hirsch opened Carolines as a cabaret in the Chelsea neighborhood in 1981 with two friends. Hirsch advocated to make it a comedy club and booked Jay Leno as its first performer. In 1983, Paul Reubens performed at the club, helping the club grow in popularity. In 1987, Carolines moved to South Street Seaport, where it became established as the country's top comedy venue. It also served as home to the A&E series Caroline's Comedy Hour, which ran for six years and won a CableACE award for Best Stand-Up Comedy Series. In 1992, the club moved to its ultimately final location on Broadway, inside 750 Seventh Avenue.

Carolines celebrated its 20th anniversary in 2003, with a gala comedy concert at Carnegie Hall that featured performances by many comedians who previously performed at the club. Attendees included Richard Belzer, Lewis Black, Mario Cantone, Judy Gold, Gilbert Gottfried, David Alan Grier, Denis Leary, Kevin Meaney, Paul Mooney, Colin Quinn, Caroline Rhea, Jeffrey Ross, Rich Vos, and, in a surprise appearance, Jon Stewart.

The club closed temporarily in March 2020, due to the COVID-19 pandemic. Supported by federal aid for live performance venues, it reopened in May 2021. On December 6, 2022, the club's owner announced that due to an imminent substantial rent increase by its landlord, the Kuwait Investment Authority, the club would be closing at the end of the year, with December 31st as the last show.
