= Bloomberg Terminal =

Computer software terminal made by Bloomberg LP

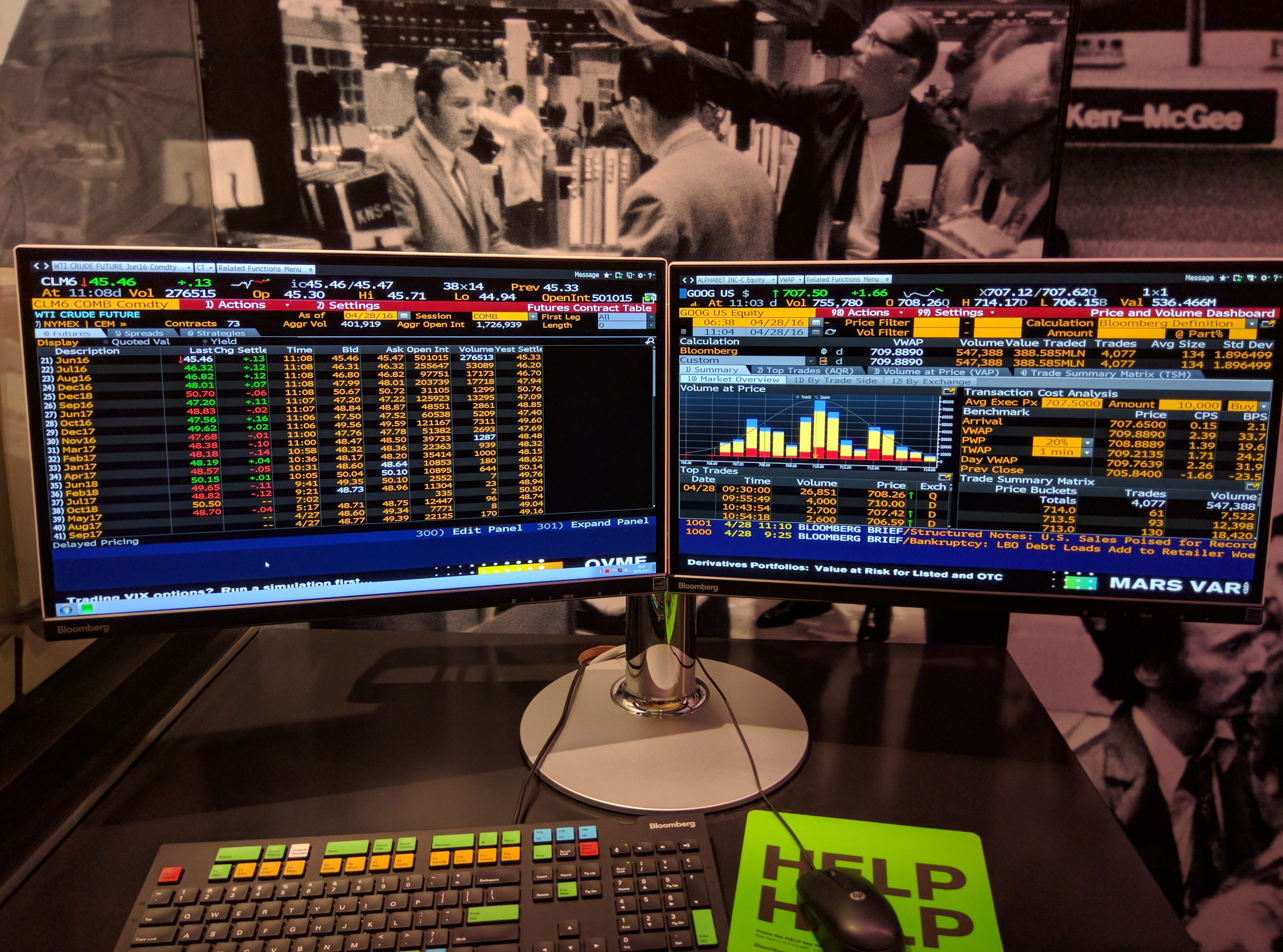
- A Bloomberg Terminal on display at the Computer History Museum's permanent collection
- Developer: Bloomberg L.P.
- Release: December 1982
- Operating system: Microsoft Windows; Other systems (using Citrix Receiver)
- Type: Electronic trading platform Financial software
- License: Proprietary
- Website: Official website

The Bloomberg Terminal is a computer software system provided by the financial data vendor Bloomberg L.P. that enables professionals in the financial service sector and other industries to access Bloomberg Professional Services through which users can monitor and analyze real-time financial market data and place trades on the electronic trading platform. It was developed by employees working for businessman Michael Bloomberg. The system also provides news, price quotes, and messaging across its proprietary network. It is well known among the financial community for its black interface, which has become a recognizable trait of the service. The first version of the terminal was released in December 1982.

Most large financial firms have subscriptions to Bloomberg Professional Services. Many exchanges charge their own additional fees for access to real time price feeds across the terminal. The same applies to various news organizations. All Bloomberg Terminals are leased in two-year cycles (in the late 1990s and early 2000s, three-year contracts were an option), with leases originally based on how many displays were connected to each terminal (this predated the move to a Windows-based application). Most Bloomberg setups have between two and six displays. As a data analytics and electronic trading platform, the Bloomberg terminal is available for an annual fee of around $24,000 per user or $27,000 per year for subscribers that use only one terminal. As of 2022, there were 325,000 Bloomberg Terminal subscribers worldwide.

== History ==
In 1981, Michael Bloomberg was fired from Salomon Brothers. He was given no severance package, but owned $10 million worth of equity as a partner at the firm. Using this money, Bloomberg, having designed in-house computerized financial systems for Salomon, set up a data services company named Innovative Market Systems (IMS) based on his belief that Wall Street would pay a premium for high-quality business information, delivered instantly on computer terminals in a variety of usable formats.

The company sold customized computer terminals that delivered real-time market data, financial calculations and other analytics to Wall Street firms. At first, the machine was called the Market Master terminal, but later became known as the Bloomberg Terminal or simply "The Bloomberg." The terminal was released to market in December 1982. Merrill Lynch became the company's first customer, purchasing a 30% stake in IMS for $30 million, in exchange for a five-year restriction on marketing the terminals to Merrill Lynch's competitors. In 1984, Merrill Lynch released IMS from the restriction.

In 1990, the Bloomberg keyboard was released with a trackball and built-in voice-chat features. In 1991, the first color edition of the terminal was released.

In 2001, Michael Bloomberg stepped away from working on the terminal to run for New York City mayor, but returned to lead the project in 2014. Starting in 2012, Bloomberg Terminal had a greater annual revenue than Thomson Reuters, the company that founded the market data business.

Currently, the hardware aspect of the terminal is only a series of accessories. Some of those accessories are a custom keyboard with special keys, a fingerprint scanner, and a dual-screen display.

== Pricing ==
Sales from the Bloomberg terminal account for more than 85 percent of Bloomberg L.P.'s annual revenue. The financial data vendor's proprietary computer system starts at $30,000 per user per year.

== Architecture ==
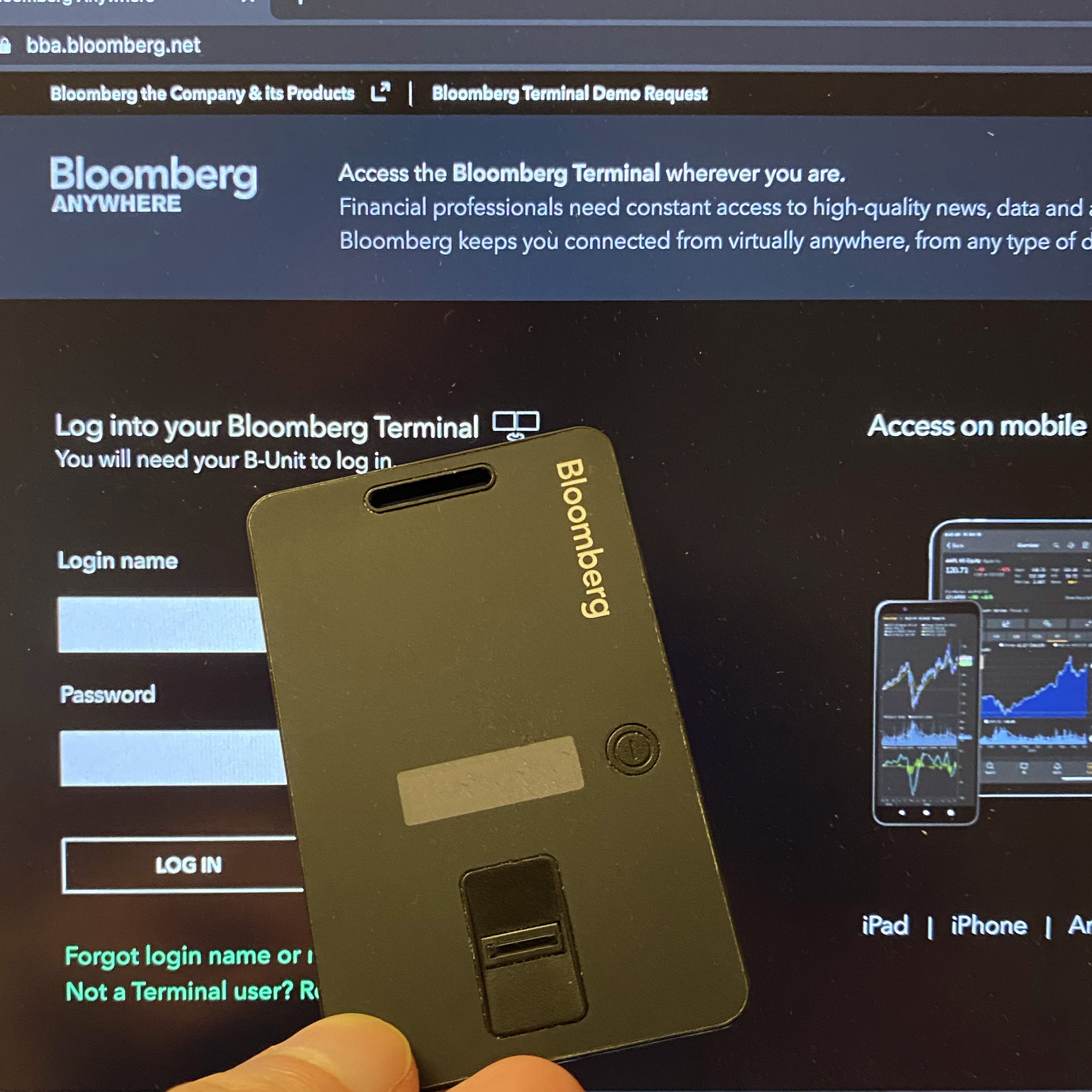
With a "B-unit" as a portable alternative to the fingerprint scanner on a Bloomberg custom keyboard, users can remotely access Bloomberg Anywhere services from any computer (regardless of operating system or architecture) via an ordinary web browser.

The terminal implements a client-server architecture with the server running on a multiprocessor Unix platform. The client, used by end users to interact with the system, is a Windows application that typically connects directly through a router provided by Bloomberg and installed on-site.

End users can also make use of an extra service (Bloomberg Anywhere) to allow the Windows application to connect via internet/IP, or Web access via a Citrix client. There are also applications that allow mobile access via Android and iOS. The server side of the terminal was originally developed using mostly the Fortran and C programming languages. Recent years have seen a transition towards C++ and embedded JavaScript on the clients and servers.

Each server machine runs multiple instances of the server process. Using a proprietary form of context switching, the servers keep track of the state of each end user, allowing consecutive interactions from a single user to be handled by different server processes. The graphical user interface (GUI) code is also proprietary.

== Keyboard ==

Michael Bloomberg's 1997 autobiography contains a chapter entitled "Computers for Virgins", which explains the differences in the design of the terminal and its keyboard from the standard IBM PC keyboard layout that was popular at that time. The terminal's keyboard layout was designed for traders and market makers who had no prior computer experience. The look and feel of the Bloomberg keyboard are similar to an ordinary computer keyboard, with several enhancements which help users navigate through the system.

Keyboard keys are commonly referred to inside angle brackets, with full commands being contained in curly brackets e.g., {VOD LN Equity GO}. The function key names and then-standard beige colour of an ordinary keyboard were changed from the technical name, e.g., F10, to a memorable name and colour, e.g., Yellow. The F10 key is thus a Yellow key named Index. The Esc is coloured red and named Cancel in the Bloomberg system, with the red to catch one's eye to stop a task. The ↵ Enter key is referred to as GO with a green color, deriving from the Monopoly game board, by passing Go and collecting $200 in a hope that the user could make money on the information he would find.

The Bloomberg keyboard includes a unique ≣ Menu key which navigates back to the previous function used. If no previous commands are found, ≣ Menu displays a list of related functions. Similarly, the History key will populate the command-line with previously used functions in reverse chronological order, as the ↑ key function does in certain command prompts.

The yellow hotkeys along the top of the keyboard are used to enter market sectors, and are generally used as suffixes to allow the terminal to correctly identify a security.

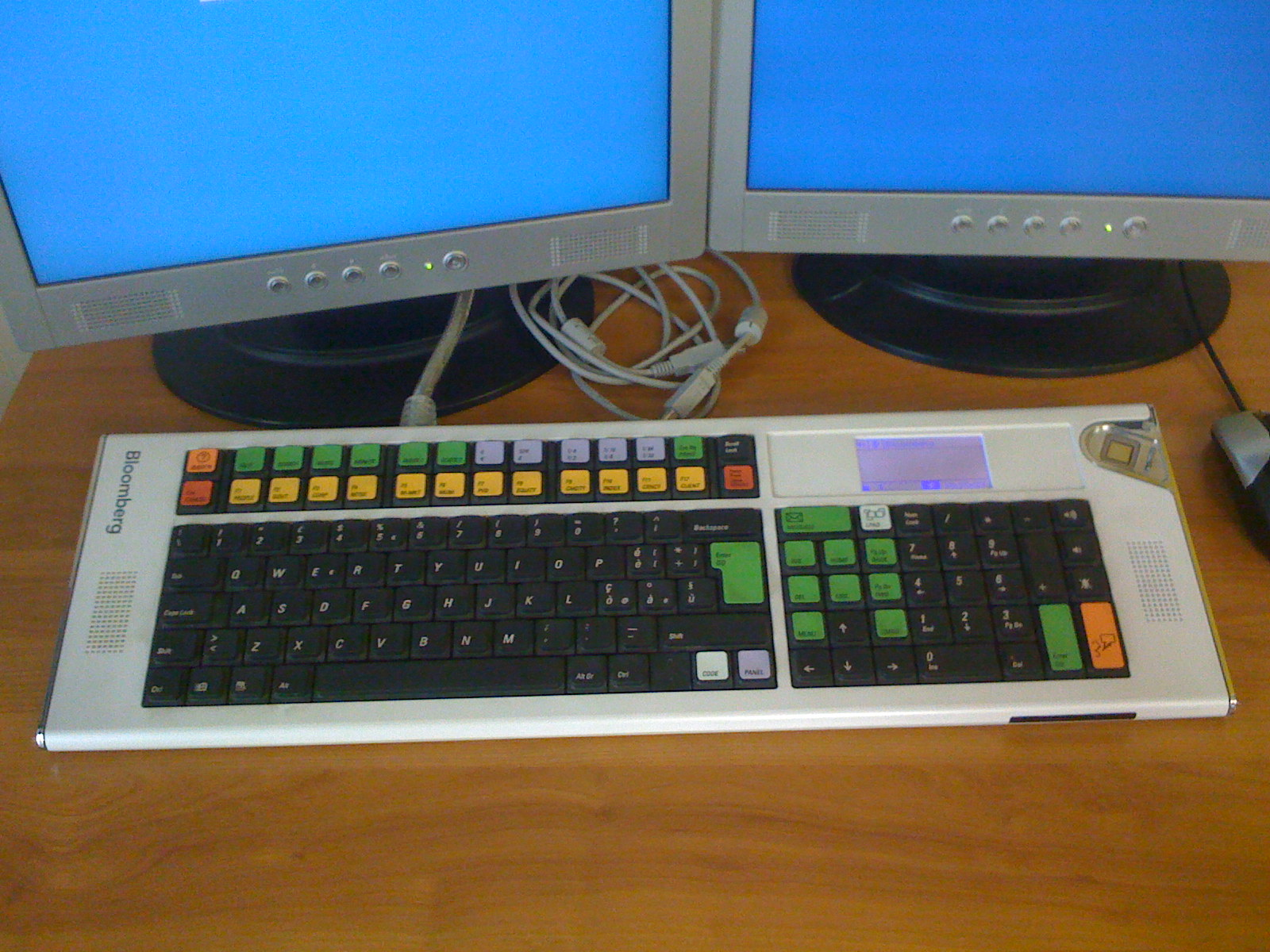
An early 2000s Bloomberg terminal keyboard

- F2 GOVT – government securities (U.S. treasury and non-U.S.)
- F3 CORP – corporate debt
- F4 MTGE – mortgage securities
- F5 M-Mkt – money market
- F6 MUNI – municipal debt
- F7 PFD – preferred shares
- F8 EQUITY – equity shares
- F9 COMDTY – commodity markets
- F10 INDEX – indices
- F11 CURNCY – currency markets
- F12 CLIENT/ALPHA – portfolio functionality

For example, if someone is interested in the Vodafone stock listed on the London market, one enters {VOD LN Equity GO} where VOD is the company's ticker symbol, LN is the venue code for London, and Equity is the market sector. A detailed option list related to Vodafone UK stock will pop up, the person can then choose different options by pressing related keys or using the mouse to select the option.

Similarly, {USDEUR Curncy GO} displays the U.S. dollar–Euro exchange spot rate.

Other common Bloomberg commands for Equity include:

- {HP GO} – Historical Price – Display the detailed historical price of the currently loaded stock
- {DVD GO} – Dividend / Split Summary of the currently loaded stock
- {CACS GO} – Corporate Actions related to the currently loaded stock
- {CN GO} – Company News – News related to the currently loaded stock

Thus, if someone interested in the historical Vodafone UK stock price, they can directly type in {VOD LN Equity HP GO}.

The Bloomberg keyboard has traditionally been heavier and sturdier than standard keyboards (a previous version, the SEA100 Bloomberg keyboard weighed around 3 kg) with 3mm key travel and 19mm key pitch; it also comes with built-in speakers for multimedia features. The SEA100 version has a built-in, 500 PPI, 0.26 sq inch biometric sensor for user login verification. The current Starboard (Keyboard 4) version is 1.08 kg and uses flatter, chiclet-style keys which are quieter and have less key travel than Freeboard (Keyboard 3) and prior.

Bloomberg keys on a US Windows keyboard
CANCEL	HELP	GOVT	CORP	MTGE	M-MKT	MUNI	PFD	EQUITY	CMDTY	INDEX	CRNCY	CLIENT	PRINT	ScrLk	CONN; DFLT
													CMAND	HOME	BACK	^{€} _{/4}	^{Sfr} _{/8}	^{¥} _{/32}	^{£} _{/64}
													DEL	MENU	FWD	SELL	QUTE 2	BUY	/16 1/2
																RPRT 1	RPRT 2	NEWS	/16 1/2
														↑		MESSAGE	MEMO	MNTOR	GO
													←	↓	→	PANEL		CODE	GO

== Terminal and related products ==
Originally a self-contained operating system running on custom hardware commonly referred to as a Bloomberg Box, the Bloomberg Terminal now functions as an application within the Windows environment. From a user's perspective, there are essentially three distinct levels to the system:

=== Core Terminal ===
Core Terminal is the original Bloomberg system. Typically consisting of four windows, or Panels, each Panel contains a separate instance of the terminal command line. As the user enters tickers and functions, they can call up and display the real-time data of the market, with each different screen simultaneously running a program to analyze other tickers, functions, values and markets in real time.

This use of multiple screens with user-demanded, specific pieces of differing data—across all relevant markets—allows the user to view large amounts of diverse information in real-time. Accessing market data, as it develops, allows the user to make trades and investments in all markets across the world, without having any lag in information. Users can run all four windows on a single monitor or spread them out amongst many monitors, maximizing the information shown on each, to effectually create up to four terminals.

In February 2012, Bloomberg LP publicly announced an upgrade to the Terminal called Bloomberg NEXT. The stated goals of this multi-year, $100 million project were to improve the discoverability and usability of the Core Terminal's functionality.

=== Launchpad ===
Launchpad is a customizable display consisting of a number of smaller windows, called components, each dedicated to permanently displaying one set of data. A typical user would be a stockbroker who wishes to keep a list of 30 stocks visible at all times: Launchpad allows the user to create a small component which will show these prices constantly, saving the user from having to check each stock independently in the 4 terminal windows.

To turn on Launchpad, the command {BLP GO} is used, {PDFB GO} allows users to set Lpad to open automatically on login. Older keyboards had an <Lpad> key which replicated the {BLP GO} command. Other functions, such as email inboxes, calculation tools and news tickers can be similarly displayed.

The Instant Bloomberg messaging/chat tool is a Launchpad component, as are the chat windows it creates. To launch a normal function from the Bloomberg Terminal's 4 Screens into launchpad, type {LLPGO} from the target screen you wish to turn into a launchpad item.

=== Application programming interface ===
The Bloomberg Open API (BLPAPI) application programming interface (API) allows third-party applications, such as Microsoft Excel, to access Bloomberg data via the Terminal and Bloomberg's market data products. A user might wish to use Bloomberg data from the Terminal to create their own calculations; by accessing streaming, historical, and reference market data from another program, they can build these formulae. The Bloomberg Terminal installation ships with Excel add-ins, which facilitate building spreadsheets which consume market data. In addition, Bloomberg offers free BLPAPI SDKs allowing Bloomberg subscribers to build their own software which accesses market data in Wolfram Language, C, C++, Java, .NET, Perl, and Python, on Windows, Linux, macOS, and Solaris.

=== Financial Instrument Global Identifier ===
In September 2021, Bloomberg earned regulatory approval for its Financial Instrument Global Identifier (FIGI), a 12-character alphanumerical, open standard, unique identifier for financial instruments that may be attached to common equities, options, derivatives, futures, corporate bonds, sovereign bonds, municipal bonds, currencies, and mortgage products. This was previously known as the Bloomberg Global Identifier and was introduced in 2009. Once issued, a FIGI number is never reused.

There are unique FIGIs that identify securities and the individual exchanges on which they trade. There are also composite FIGIs that may be used to represent unique securities across related exchanges, although unique FIGIs would be used to identify common stock on an individual exchange. The FIGI structure is defined and copyrighted by the Object Management Group. Unique FIGIs are published by Bloomberg L.P. It's a competitor to the CUSIP.

=== Legal Entity Identifiers ===
In April 2022, Bloomberg released the Common Data Format 3.1 for Legal Entity Identifiers (LEIs) and received accreditation as an LEI issuer for funds, a move which would allow firms to better understand their exposure to different types of legal entities and meet regulatory requirements. Like the FIGI, the LEI is managed under the Open Symbology unit of Bloomberg.

== Competitors ==
The largest competitor to the Bloomberg Terminal is Refinitiv (now LSEG Data & Analytics) with its Eikon offering, formerly owned by Thomson Reuters. Bloomberg and Thomson Reuters split the market with a share of 30% each in 2011. This was a major improvement for Bloomberg as the share in 2007 was Bloomberg's 26% to Reuters' 36%.

Other major competitors include Money.Net, SIX Financial Information, Markit, FactSet Research Systems, Capital IQ, Symphony, Fidessa and Dow Jones. According to Burton-Taylor International Consulting, the market for financial data and analytics was worth almost $25 billion as of 2011. By the mid-2020s, the global market data industry expanded to nearly $50 billion, prompting the growth of lower-cost alternative charting platforms like TradingView and YCharts.

Concurrently, a subset of emerging financial technology startups began leveraging artificial intelligence to introduce automated broker and terminal layers. These include companies such as AlphaSense for document intelligence and Horizon Trade for algorithmic strategy generation and automated retail execution layers.

== See also ==
- Bloomberg L.P.
- Bloomberg News
- Financial data vendor
