= Shell plc =

British multinational oil and gas company

- Shell logo used since 1971

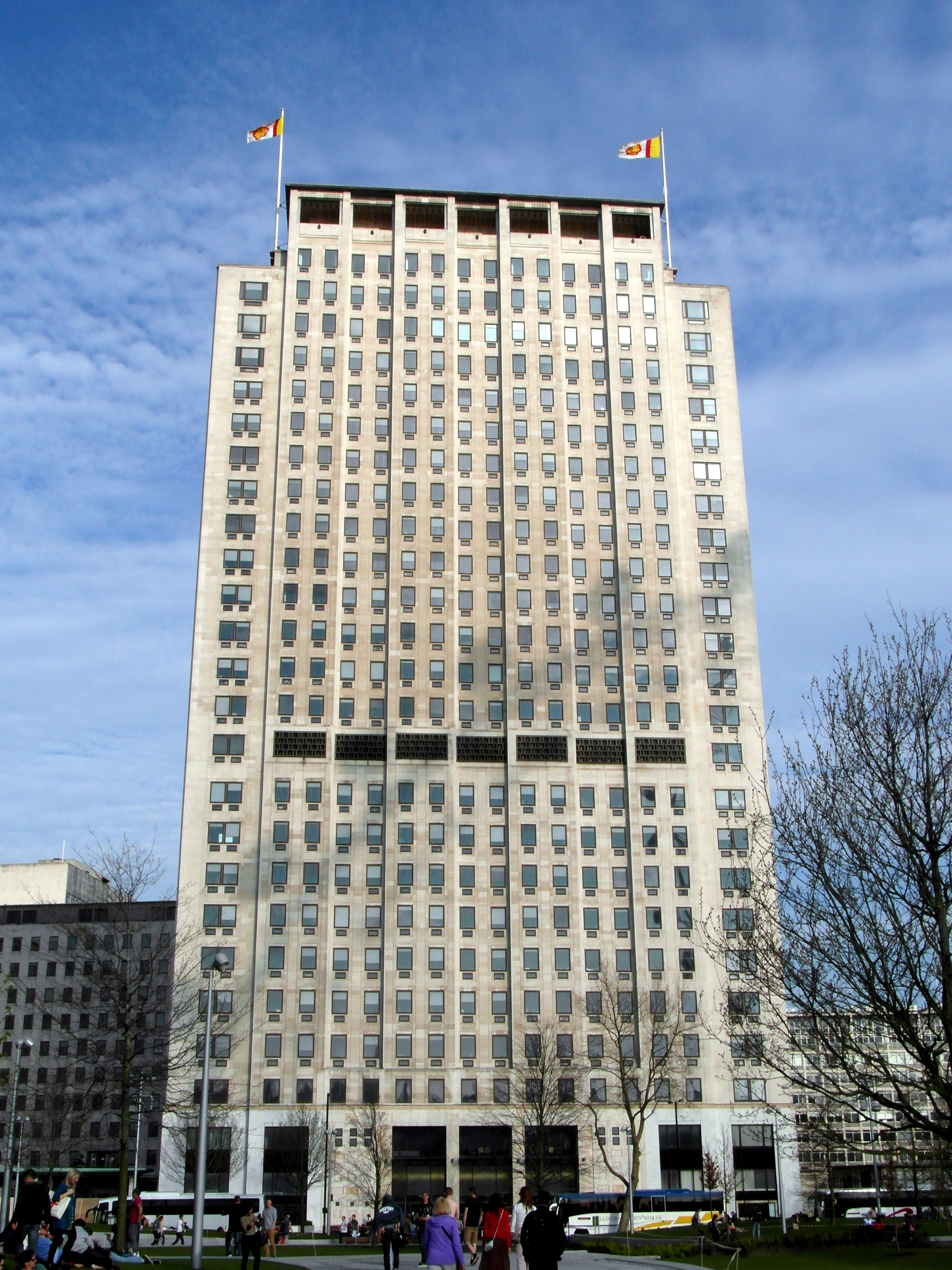
- Shell Centre headquarters in London
- Formerly: Forthdeal Limited (2002–2004); Royal Dutch Shell plc (2004–2022)
- Type: Public
- Traded as: LSE: SHEL; Euronext Amsterdam: SHELL; NYSE: SHEL; FTSE 100 component; AEX component
- ISIN: GB00BP6MXD84
- Industry: Energy; Petroleum
- Predecessors: Royal Dutch Petroleum Company (1890); The "Shell" Transport and Trading Company (1897)
- Founded: April 1907; 119 years ago (as Royal Dutch Shell); 20 July 2005; 21 years ago in Shell Centre, London (current entity)
- Founders: Henri Deterding; August Kessler; Marcus Samuel; Samuel Samuel
- Headquarters: Shell Centre; London, England
- Area served: Worldwide
- Key people: Sir Andrew Mackenzie (chairman); Wael Sawan (CEO)
- Products: LNG; Lubricants; Natural gas; Petrochemicals; Petroleum
- Brands: Jiffy Lube; Pennzoil; Quaker State; Shell Advance; Shell Broadband; Shell Helix; Shell Nautilus; Shell Rimula; Shell Rotella; Shell V-Power
- Revenue: ▼US$266.9 billion (2025)
- Operating income: ▼US$34.4 billion (2025)
- Net income: ▲US$18.1 billion (2025)
- Total assets: ▼US$370.4 billion (2025)
- Total equity: ▼US$175.3 billion (2025)
- Number of employees: 96,000 (2026)
- Divisions: Shell Chemicals; Shell Gas & Power
- Subsidiaries: List: Shell Argentina; Shell Australia; Shell Canada; Shell Brunei; Shell Chile; Shell Hong Kong; Shell India; Shell Italia; Shell Morocco; Shell Nigeria; Shell Oman; Shell Pakistan; Shell Philippines; Shell South Africa; Shell Tunisia; Shell USA
- Website: www.shell.com
- Footnotes: ^{a} formerly known as "the Royal Dutch Company for the Exploitation of Petroleum Wells in the Dutch East Indies"

Shell plc is a British multinational oil and gas company, headquartered in London, England. Shell is a public limited company with a primary listing on the London Stock Exchange (LSE) and secondary listings on Euronext Amsterdam and the New York Stock Exchange. Shell is the largest investor owned oil company in Europe, third largest globally behind ExxonMobil and Chevron, and among the world's largest companies out of any industry. Measured by both its own emissions, and the emissions of all the fossil fuels it sells, Shell was the ninth-largest corporate producer of greenhouse gas emissions in the period 1988–2015.

Shell was formed in April 1907 through the merger of Royal Dutch Petroleum Company of the Netherlands and the "Shell" Transport and Trading Company of the United Kingdom, with 60 percent of stock ownership under Royal Dutch. The merger was arranged by Calouste Gulbenkian, a British-Armenian oil magnate. The combined company rapidly became the leading competitor of the American Standard Oil and by 1920 Shell was the largest producer of oil in the world. Shell first entered the chemicals industry in 1929. Shell was one of the "Seven Sisters" which dominated the global petroleum industry from the mid-1940s to the mid-1970s. In 1964, Shell was a partner in the world's first commercial sea transportation of liquefied natural gas (LNG). In 1970, Shell acquired the mining company Billiton, which it subsequently sold in 1994 and now forms part of BHP. In recent decades gas has become an increasingly important part of Shell's business and Shell acquired BG Group in 2016.

Shell is vertically integrated and is active in every area of the oil and gas industry, including exploration, production, refining, transport, distribution and marketing, petrochemicals, power generation, and trading. Shell has operations in over 99 countries, produces around 3.7 million barrels of oil equivalent per day and has around 44,000 service stations worldwide. As of 31 December, Shell had total proved oil and gas reserves of 8.123 billion barrels of oil equivalent. Shell USA, its principal subsidiary in the United States, is one of the company's largest businesses. Shell holds 44% of Raízen, a publicly listed joint venture with Cosan, which is the third-largest Brazil-based energy company. In addition to the main Shell brand, the company also owns the Jiffy Lube, Pennzoil and Quaker State brands.

Shell is a constituent of the FTSE 100 Index and had a market capitalisation of £186 billion on 24 July 2026, making it the third largest company listed on the LSE and 69th globally. In terms of the revenue, Shell generated $284B in 2024, a significant decline over a decade, from $451B in 2013.

== History ==
=== Origins ===
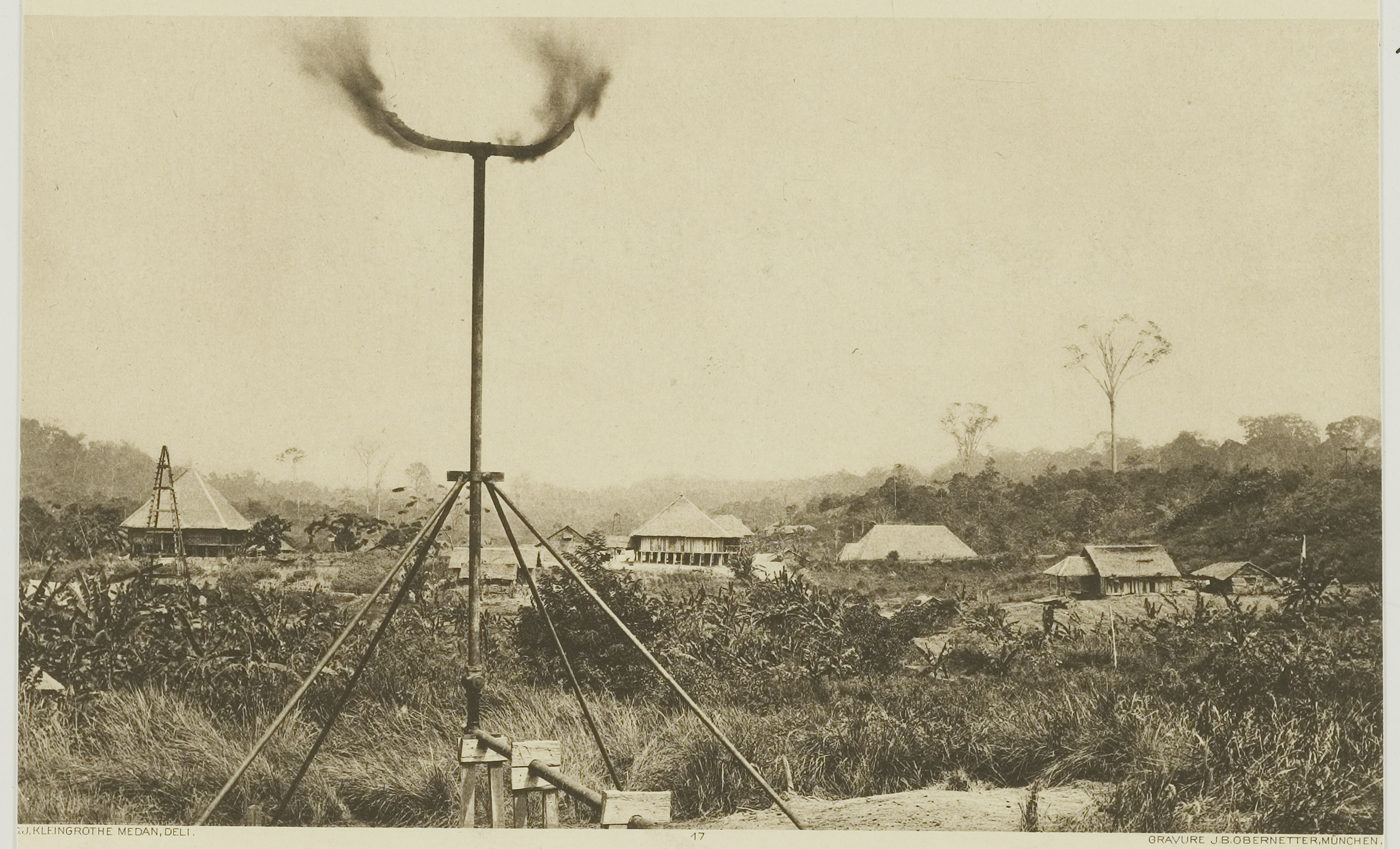
The oil well at Pangkalan Brandan, North Sumatra, is considered to be the origin of Royal Dutch Shell, c. 1905

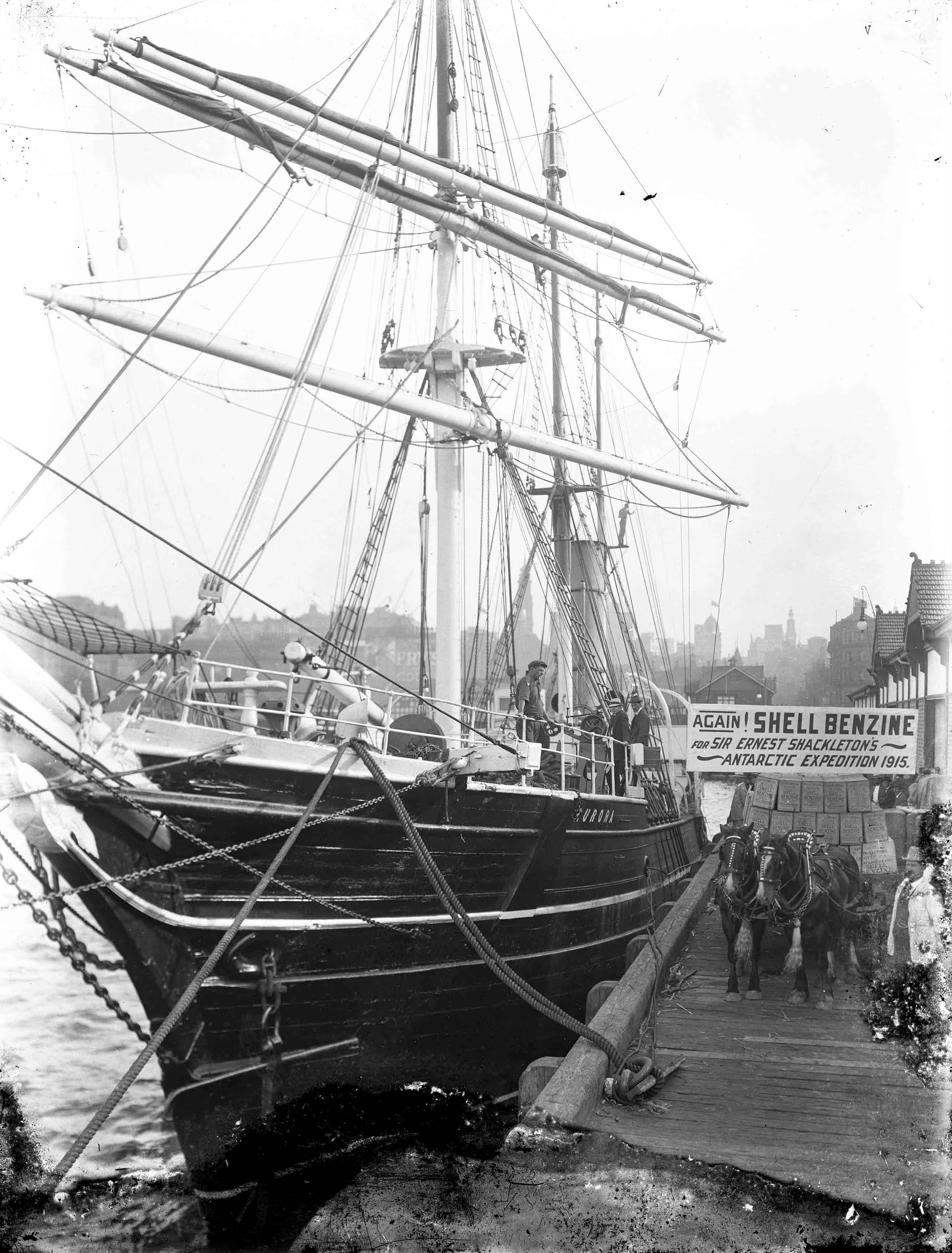
Shell benzine for Sir Ernest Henry Shackleton, Antarctic Expedition 1915

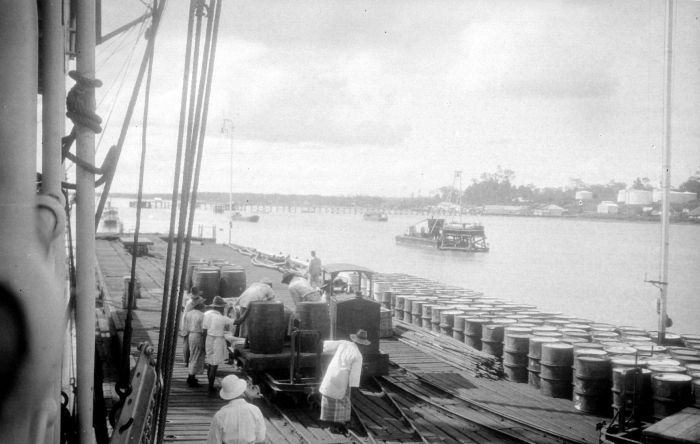
Royal Dutch Petroleum dock in the Dutch East Indies (now Indonesia), c. 1925

The Royal Dutch Shell Group was created in April 1907 through the amalgamation of two rival companies: the Royal Dutch Petroleum Company (Dutch: Koninklijke Nederlandse Petroleum Maatschappij) of the Netherlands and the "Shell" Transport and Trading Company Limited of the United Kingdom. It was a move largely driven by the need to compete globally with Standard Oil. The merger was arranged by British-Armenian oil magnate Calouste Gulbenkian, resulting in him emerging as a major shareholder of the newly formed company. The Royal Dutch Petroleum Company was a Dutch company founded in 1890 to develop an oilfield in Pangkalan Brandan, North Sumatra, and initially led by August Kessler, Hugo Loudon, and Henri Deterding. The "Shell" Transport and Trading Company (the quotation marks were part of the legal name) was a British company, founded in 1897 by Marcus Samuel, 1st Viscount Bearsted, and his brother Samuel Samuel. Their father had owned an antique company in Houndsditch, London, which expanded in 1833 to import and sell seashells, after which the company "Shell" took its name.

For various reasons, the new firm operated as a dual-listed company, whereby the merging companies maintained their legal existence but operated as a single-unit partnership for business purposes. The terms of the merger gave 60 percent stock ownership of the new group to Royal Dutch, and 40 percent to Shell. Both became holding companies for Bataafse Petroleum Maatschappij, containing the production and refining assets, and Anglo-Saxon Petroleum Company, containing the transport and storage assets. National patriotic sensibilities would not permit a full-scale merger or takeover of either of the two companies. The Dutch company, Koninklijke Nederlandsche Petroleum Maatschappij at The Hague, was in charge of production and manufacture. The British Anglo-Saxon Petroleum Company was based in London, to direct the transport and storage of the products.

In 1912, Royal Dutch Shell purchased the Rothschilds' Russian oil assets in a stock deal. The group's production portfolio then consisted of 53 percent from the East Indies, 29 percent from the Russian Empire, and 17 percent from Romania.

=== 20th century ===
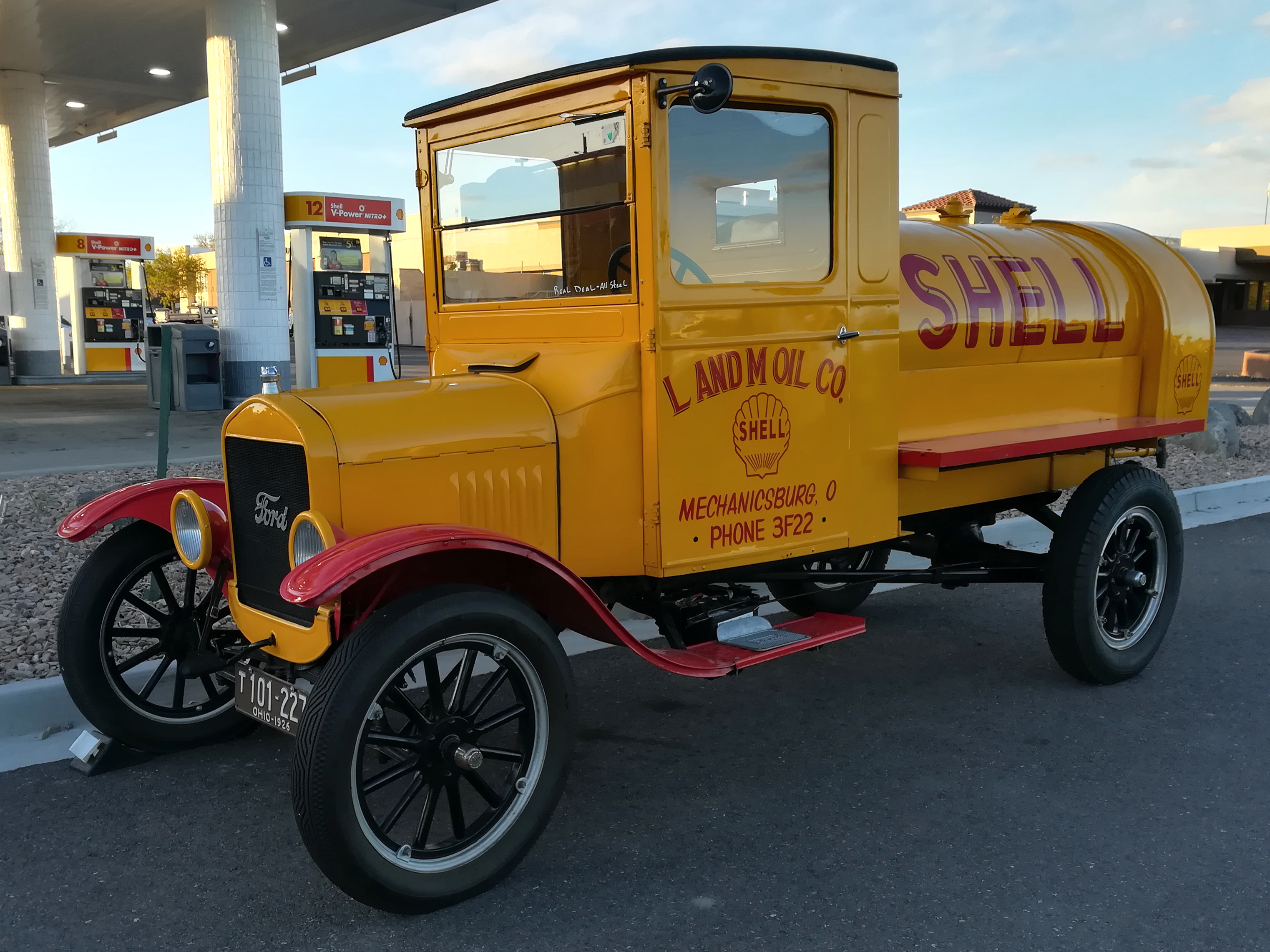
Shell tank truck from 1926 based on a Ford Model TT

During the First World War, Shell was the main supplier of fuel to the British Expeditionary Force. It was also the sole supplier of aviation fuel and supplied 80 percent of the British Army's TNT. It also volunteered all of its shipping to the British Admiralty.

The German invasion of Romania in 1916 saw 17% of the group's worldwide production destroyed. In 1919, Shell took control of the Mexican Eagle Petroleum Company and in 1921 formed Shell-Mex Limited, which marketed products under the "Shell" and "Eagle" brands in the United Kingdom. During the Genoa Conference of 1922 Royal Dutch Shell was in negotiations for a monopoly over Soviet oilfields in Baku and Grosny, although the leak of a draft treaty led to breakdown of the talks. In 1929, Shell Chemicals was founded. By the end of the 1920s, Shell was the world's leading oil company, producing 11 percent of the world's crude oil supply and owning 10 percent of its tanker tonnage.

During the Spanish Civil War the company sold oil to the Nationalist side of Francisco Franco.

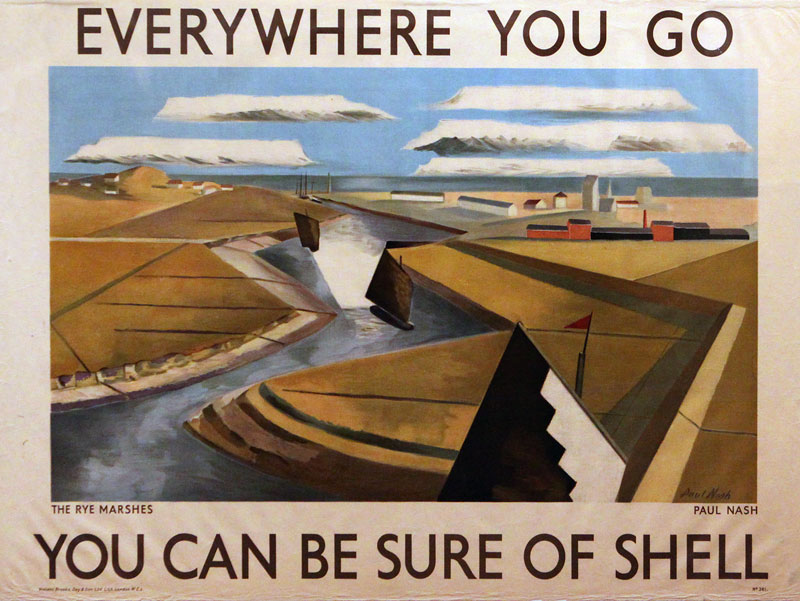
1932 Shell advertisement poster by the British surrealist painter Paul Nash

Located in the north bank of the River Thames in London, Shell Mex House was completed in 1931, and was the head office for Shell's marketing activity worldwide. In 1932, partly in response to the difficult economic conditions of the Great Depression, Shell-Mex merged its UK marketing operations with those of BP (British Petroleum) to create Shell-Mex & BP, a company that traded until the brands separated in 1975. Royal Dutch Company ranked 79th among United States corporations in the value of World War II military production contracts.

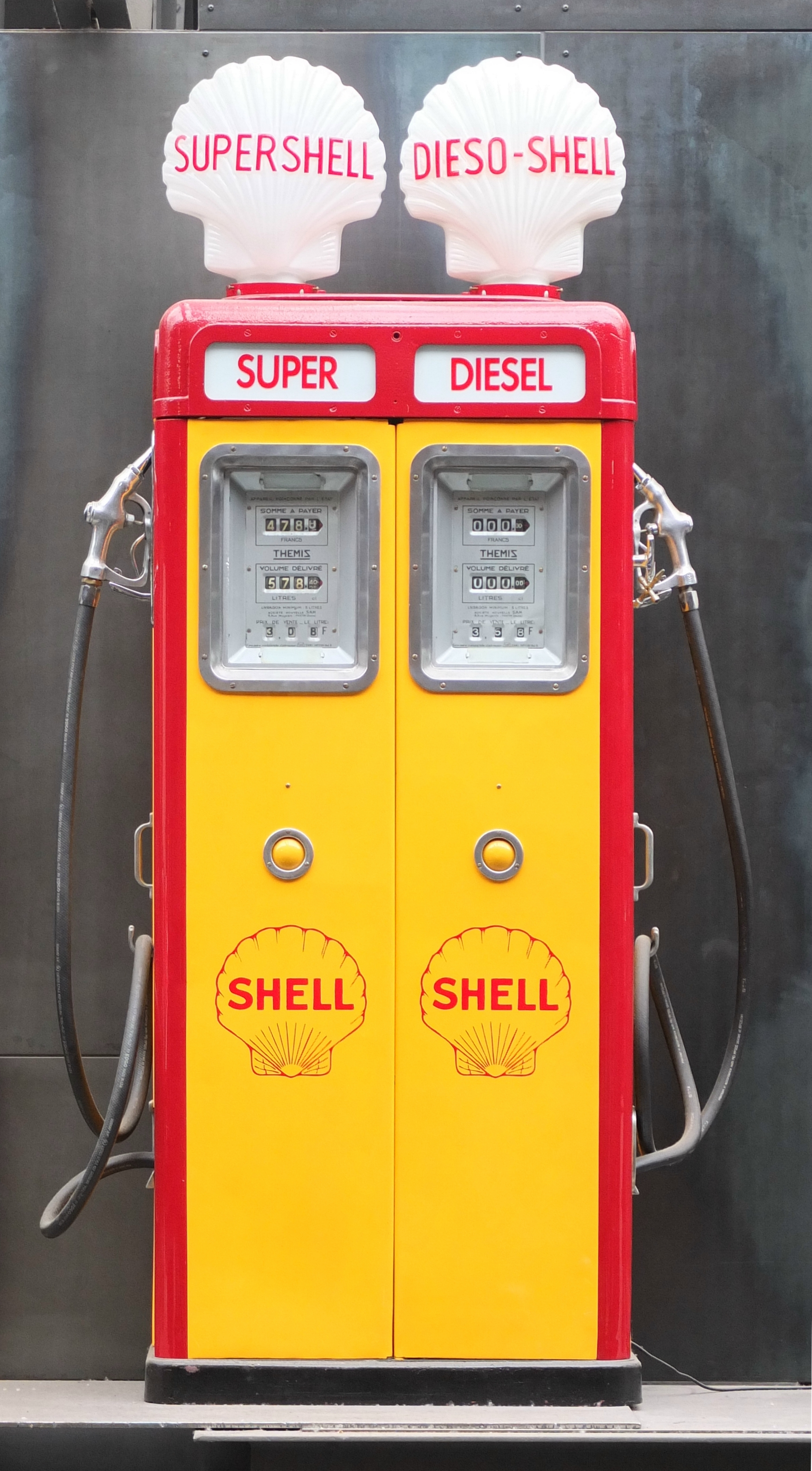
Vintage petrol pump (1952)

The 1930s saw Shell's Mexican assets seized by the local government. After the invasion of the Netherlands by Nazi Germany in 1940, the head office of the Dutch companies was moved to Curaçao. In 1945, Shell's Danish headquarters in Copenhagen, at the time being used by the Gestapo, was bombed by Royal Air Force De Havilland Mosquitoes in Operation Carthage.

In 1937, Iraq Petroleum Company (IPC), 23.75 percent owned by Royal Dutch Shell plc, signed an oil concession agreement with the Sultan of Muscat. In 1952, IPC offered financial support to raise an armed force that would assist the Sultan in occupying the interior region of Oman, an area that geologists believed to be rich in oil. This led to the 1954 outbreak of the Jebel Akhdar War in Oman that lasted for more than 5 years.

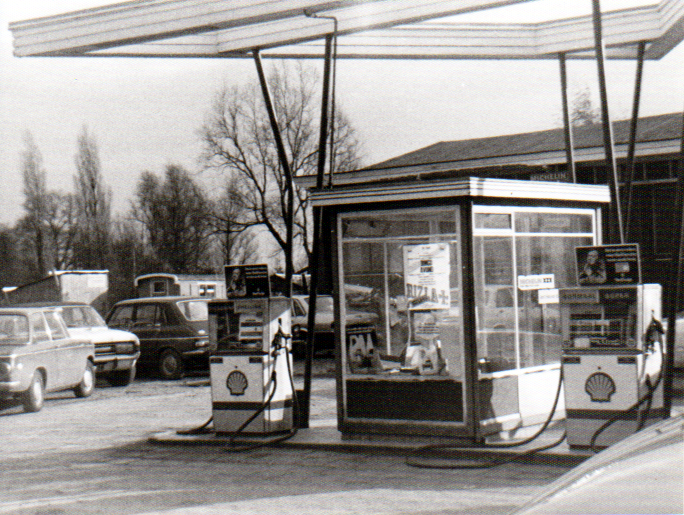
Royal Dutch Shell filling station and garage in Mijnsheerenland, the Netherlands, late-1970s

Around 1952, Shell was the first company to purchase and use a computer in the Netherlands. The computer, a Ferranti Mark 1*, was assembled and used at the Shell laboratory in Amsterdam. In 1970, Shell acquired the mining company Billiton, which it subsequently sold in 1994.

In 1989, Shell redesigned a $3-billion natural gas platform in the North Sea, raising its height one to two meters, to accommodate an anticipated sea level rise due to global warming.

In the 1990s, protesters criticised the company's environmental record, particularly the possible pollution caused by the proposed disposal of the Brent Spar platform into the North Sea. Despite support from the UK government, Shell reversed the decision under public pressure but maintained that sinking the platform would have been environmentally better. Shell subsequently published an unequivocal commitment to sustainable development, supported by executive speeches reinforcing this commitment. Shell was subsequently criticised by the European Commission and five European Union members after deciding to leave part of its decommissioned oil rigs standing in the North Sea. Shell argued that removing them would be too costly and risky. Germany said that the estimated 11,000 tonnes of raw oil and toxins remaining in the rigs would eventually seep into the sea, and called it a 'ticking timebomb'.

On 15 January 1999, off the Argentinian town of Magdalena, Buenos Aires, the Shell tanker Estrella pampeana collided with a German cargo ship, emptying its contents into the lake, polluting the environment, drinkable water, plants and animals. Over a decade after the spill, a referendum held in Magdalena determined the acceptance of a US$9.5 million compensatory payout from Shell. Shell denied responsibility for the spill, but an Argentine court ruled in 2002 that the corporation was responsible.

=== 21st century ===
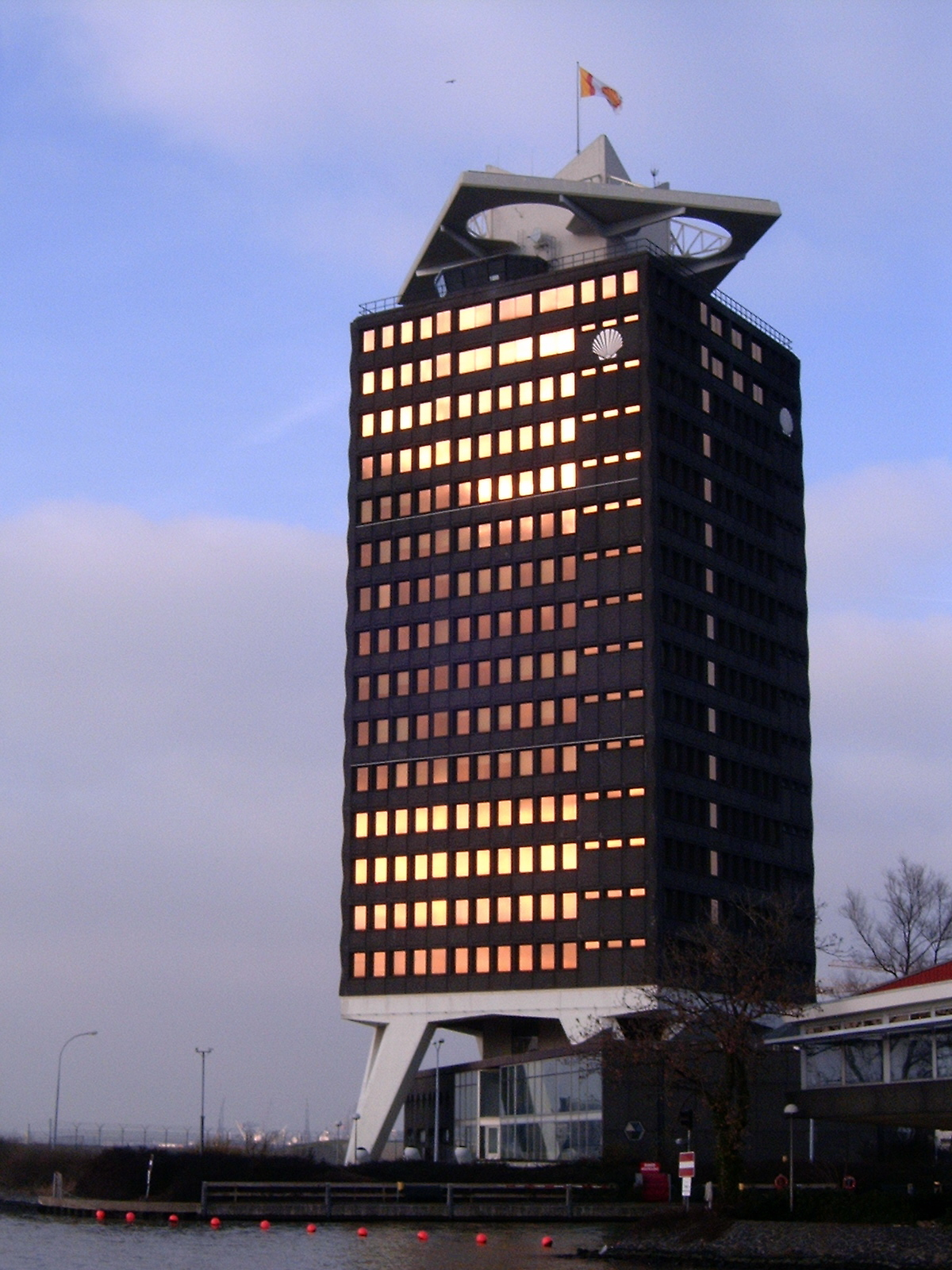
Former Shell Research and Technology Centre, Amsterdam, c. 2000

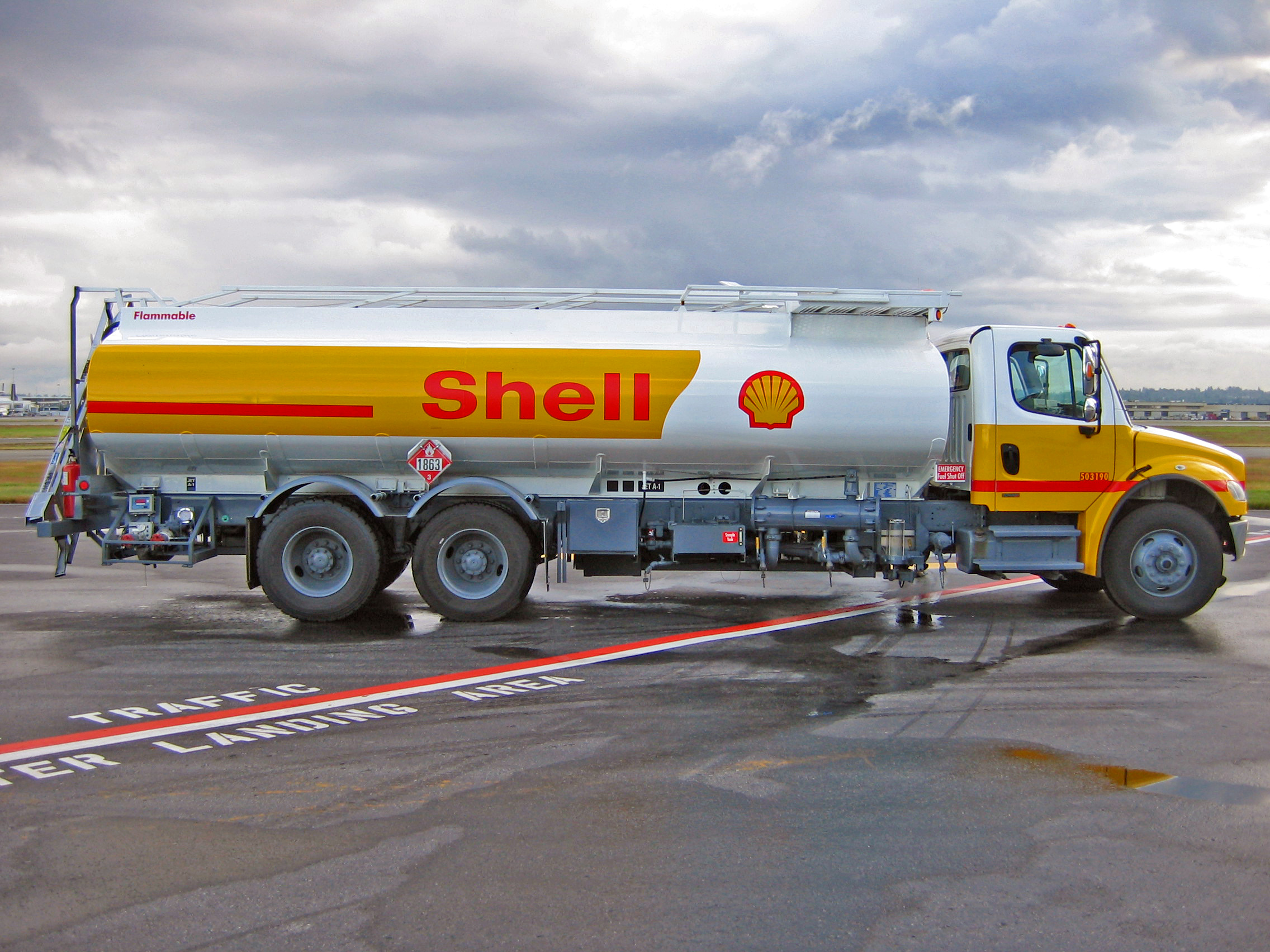
A Shell JET A refueller truck on the ramp at Vancouver International Airport, 2005

In 2002, Shell acquired Pennzoil-Quaker State through its American division for US$22 per share, or about US$1.8 billion. With its acquisition, Shell inherited multiple auto part brands including Jiffy Lube, Rain-X, and Fix-a-Flat. The company was notably late in its acquisition as seen by journalists, with Shell seen as streamlining its assets around the same time of other major mergers and acquisitions in the industry, such as BP's purchase of Amoco and the merger of Exxon and Mobil.

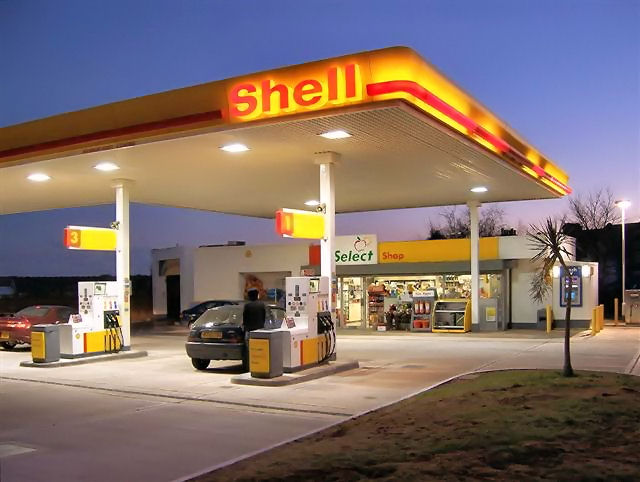
Shell filling station in the UK, 2006

In 2004, Shell overstated its oil reserves, resulting in loss of confidence in the group, a £17 million fine by the Financial Services Authority and the departure of the chairman Philip Watts. A lawsuit resulted in the payment of $450 million to non-American shareholders in 2007.

As a result of the scandal, the corporate structure was simplified. Two classes of ordinary shares, A (code RDSA) and B (code RDSB), identical but for the tax treatment of dividends, were issued for the company.

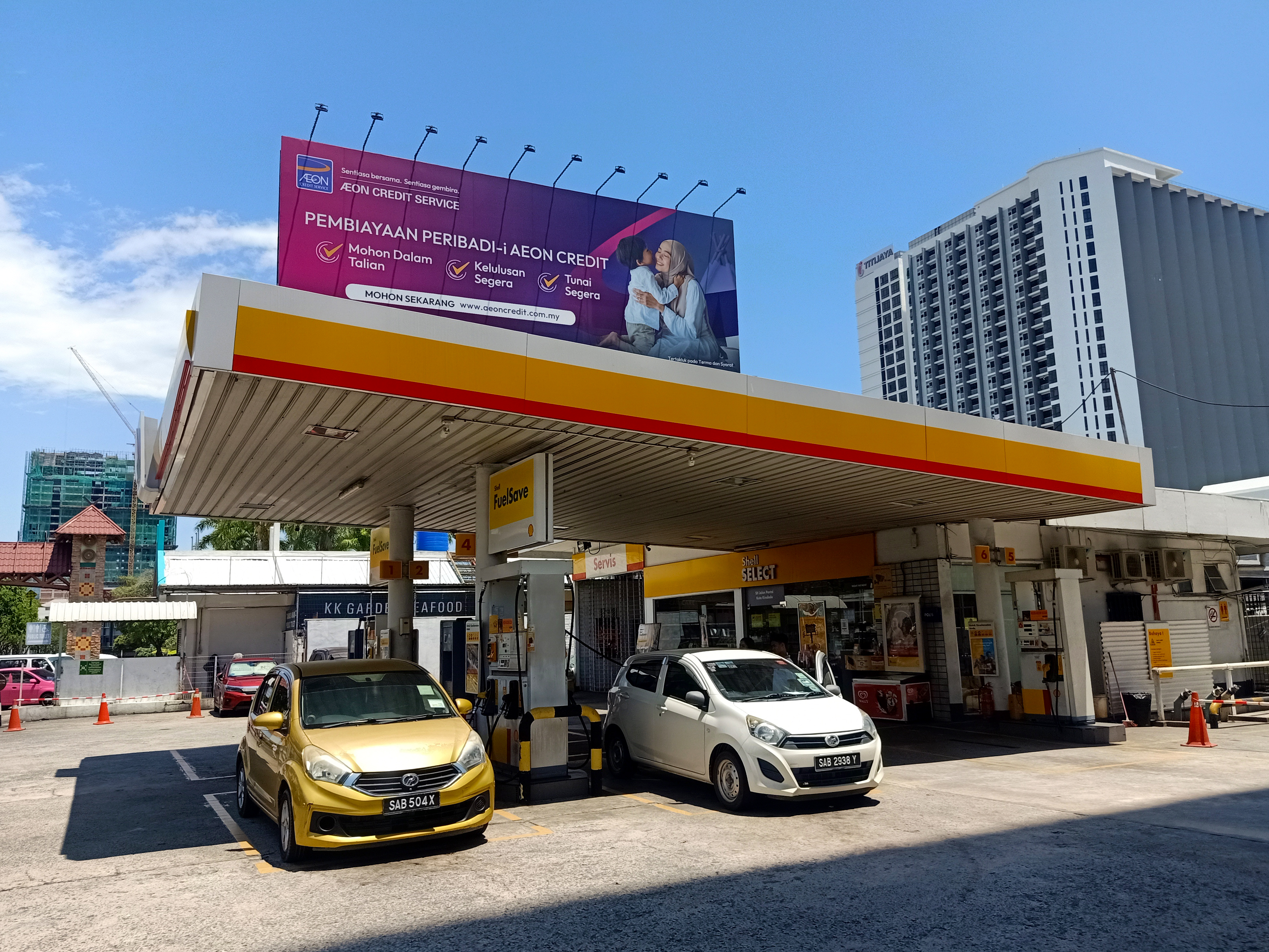
Shell Gas Station at Gaya Street Sunday Market, Kota Kinabalu, 2024

In November 2004, following a period of turmoil caused by the revelation that Shell had been overstating its oil reserves, it was announced that the Shell Group would move to a single capital structure, creating a new parent company to be named Royal Dutch Shell plc, with its primary listing on the LSE, a secondary listing on Euronext Amsterdam, its headquarters and tax residency in The Hague, Netherlands and its registered office in London. The company was already incorporated in 2002 as Forthdeal Limited, a shelf corporation incorporated by Swift Incorporations Limited and Instant Companies Limited, both based in Bristol. The unification was completed on 20 July 2005 and the original owners delisted their companies from the respective exchanges.

On 20 July 2005, the "Shell" Transport and Trading Company plc was delisted from the LSE, changing its name to the Shell Transport and Trading Company Limited whereas Royal Dutch Petroleum Company was delisted from the New York Stock Exchange on 18 November 2005. The shares of the company were issued at a 60/40 advantage for the shareholders of Royal Dutch in line with the original ownership of the Shell Group. The nearly century-old partnership between Royal Dutch Petroleum Company (incorporated in the Netherlands) and the "Shell" Transport and Trading Company plc (incorporated in the United Kingdom) was dissolved. This unification eliminated the previous parent structure and created a single, new holding company incorporated in the United Kingdom: Royal Dutch Shell plc.

During the 2009 Iraqi oil services contracts tender, a consortium led by Shell (45%) and which included Petronas (30%) was awarded a production contract for the "Majnoon field" in the south of Iraq, which contains an estimated 12.6 billion barrels (2.00×10^{9} m^{3}) of oil. The "West Qurna 1 field" production contract was awarded to a consortium led by ExxonMobil (60%) and included Shell (15%).

This domain name, royaldutchshell.com was first registered by a former marketing manager for Royal Dutch Shell plc, Alfred Donovan, and has been used as a "gripe site". It avoids being an illegal cybersquatter as long as it is non-commercial, active, and no attempt is made to sell the domain name, as determined by WIPO proceedings. In 2005, Donovan said he would relinquish the site to Shell after it "gets rid of all the management he deems responsible for its various recent woes". The site has been recognized by several media outlets for its role as an Internet leak. In 2008, the Financial Times published an article based on a letter published by royaldutchshellplc.com, which Reuters and The Times also covered shortly thereafter. On 18 October 2006, the site published an article stating that Shell had for some time been supplying information to the Russian government relating to Sakhalin II. The Russian energy company Gazprom subsequently obtained a 50% stake in the Sakhalin-II project. Other instances where the site has acted as an Internet leak include a 2007 IT outsourcing plan, as well as a 2008 internal memo where CEO Jeroen van der Veer expressed disappointment in the company's share-price performance.

The gripe site has also been recognized as a source of information regarding Shell by several news sources. In the 2006 Fortune Global 500 rankings, in which Royal Dutch Shell placed third, royaldutchshellplc.com was listed alongside shell.com as a source of information. In 2007, the site was described as "a hub for activists and disgruntled former employees". A 2009 article called royaldutchshellplc.com "the world's most effective adversarial Web site". The site has been described as "an open wound for Shell".

In February 2010, Shell and Cosan formed a 50:50 joint-venture, Raízen, comprising all of Cosan's Brazilian ethanol, energy generation, fuel distribution and sugar activities, and all of Shell's Brazilian retail fuel and aviation distribution businesses. In March 2010, Shell announced the sale of some of its assets, including its liquefied petroleum gas (LPG) business, to meet the cost of a planned $28bn capital spending programme. Shell invited buyers to submit indicative bids, due by 22 March, with a plan to raise $2–3bn from the sale. In June 2010, Shell agreed to acquire all the business of East Resources for a cash consideration of $4.7 billion. The transaction included East Resources' tight gas fields.

Over the course of 2013, the corporation began the sale of its US shale gas assets and canceled a US$20 billion gas project that was to be constructed in the US state of Louisiana. A new CEO Ben van Beurden was appointed in January 2014, prior to the announcement that the corporation's overall performance in 2013 was 38 percent lower than in 2012—the value of Shell's shares fell by 3 percent as a result. Following the sale of the majority of its Australian assets in February 2014, the corporation plans to sell a further US$15 billion worth of assets in the period leading up to 2015, with deals announced in Australia, Brazil and Italy.

Shell announced on 8 April 2015 it had agreed to buy BG Group for £47 billion (US$70 billion), subject to shareholder and regulatory approval. The acquisition was completed in February 2016, resulting in Shell surpassing Chevron Corporation and becoming the world's second largest non-state oil company.

On 7 June 2016, Shell announced that it would build an ethane cracker plant near Pittsburgh, Pennsylvania, after spending several years doing an environmental cleanup of the proposed plant's site.

In January 2017, Shell agreed to sell £2.46bn worth of North Sea assets to oil exploration firm Chrysaor. In 2017, Shell sold its oil sands assets to Canadian Natural Resources in exchange of approximately 8.8% stake in that company. In May 2017, it was reported that Shell plans to sell its shares in Canadian Natural Resources fully exiting the oil sands business.

On 5 November 2017, the Paradise Papers, a set of confidential electronic documents relating to offshore investment, revealed that Argentine Energy Minister Juan José Aranguren was revealed to have managed the offshore companies 'Shell Western Supply and Trading Limited' and 'Sol Antilles y Guianas Limited', both subsidiaries of Shell. One is the main bidder for the purchase of diesel oil by the government through the state owned CAMMESA (Compañía Administradora del Mercado Mayorista Eléctrico).

On 30 April 2020, Shell announced that it would cut its dividend for the first time since the Second World War, due to the oil price collapse following the reduction in oil demand during the COVID-19 pandemic. Shell stated that their net income adjusted for the cost of supply dropped to US$2.9 billion in three months to 31 March. This compared with US$5.3 billion in the same period the previous year. On 30 September 2020, the company said that it would cut up to 9,000 jobs as a result of the economic effects caused by the pandemic and announced a "broad restructuring". In December 2020, Shell forecast another write-down of $3.5–4.5 billion for the fourth quarter due to lower oil prices, following $16.8 billion of impairment in the second quarter.

In September 2020, the Northern Lights CCS project was announced, which is a joint project between Equinor, Shell and Total, operating in the European Union (Norway) and aiming to store liquid CO_{2} beneath the seabed.

In February 2021, Shell announced a loss of $21.7 billion in 2020 due to the COVID-19 pandemic, despite reducing its operating expenses by 12%, or $4.5 billion, according to a Morningstar analysis cited by Barron's.

In November 2021, Shell announced that it is planning to relocate their headquarters to London, abandon its dual share structure, and change its name from Royal Dutch Shell plc to Shell plc. The company's name change was registered in the Companies House on 21 January 2022.

In December 2021, Shell pulled out of the Cambo oil field, off the Shetland Islands, claiming that "the economic case for investment in this project is not strong enough at this time, as well as having the potential for delays". The proposed oilfield had been the subject of intense campaigning by environmentalists in the run-up to the COP26 UN climate summit in Glasgow in November 2021.

On 4 March 2022, during the Russian invasion of Ukraine and in the midst of the growing boycott of Russian economy and related divestments, Shell bought a cargo of discounted Russian crude oil. The next day, following criticism from Ukraine's Foreign Minister Dmytro Kuleba, Shell defended the purchase as a short term necessity, but also announced that it intended to reduce such purchases, and it would put profits from any Russian oil it purchases into a fund that would go towards humanitarian aid to Ukraine. On 8 March, Shell announced that it would stop buying Russian oil and gas and close its service stations in the country.

Shell already had previous experience exiting markets that were subject to sanctions pressure from NATO or EU member states. In particular, in 2013, Shell announced that it was suspending its operations in Syria. On 8 March 2022, Shell announced its intention to phase out all Russian hydrocarbon production and acquisition projects, including crude oil, petroleum products, natural gas and liquefied natural gas (LNG). In early 2022, the company was criticized by the Minister of Foreign Affairs of Ukraine for its slow response to the Russian invasion. As of April 2023, Shell still had shares in Russian companies, such as 27.5% in Sakhalin Energy Investment Company (SEIC), a joint venture with Gazprom (50%), Mitsui (12.5%) and Mitsubishi (10%).

In 2022, the major oil and gas companies, including Shell, reported sharp rises in interim revenues and profits. In fact, this rise in profit for Shell was so sharp, that 2022 was the company's best year, as Shell recorded double the profits from 2021, and the highest profit in its entire history.

In November 2024, Shell won a case in the Hague court of appeal against Friends of the Earth which would have required Shell to cut its carbon emissions by 45%, in line with the Paris Climate Accords.

In April 2026, Shell agreed to acquire Canadian energy company ARC Resources for approximately $16.4 billion, including assumed debt and leases. The acquisition was completed in September 2026, adding approximately 370,000 barrels of oil equivalent per day to Shell's portfolio and expanded its presence in Canada's Montney Formation.

== Corporate affairs ==
Big Oil companies (2021) (Note: Data is based on the 2022 Fortune 500.)
Company	Revenue (USD bn)	Profit (USD bn)	Brands
ExxonMobil	286	23	Mobil; Esso; Imperial Oil
Shell plc	273	20	Jiffy Lube; Pennzoil
TotalEnergies	185	16	Elf Aquitaine; SunPower
BP	164	7.6	Amoco; Aral AG
Chevron	163	16	Texaco; Caltex; Havoline
Marathon	141	10	ARCO
Phillips 66	115	1.3	76; Conoco; JET
Valero	108	0.9	—N/a
Eni	77	5.8	—N/a
ConocoPhillips	48.3	8.1	—N/a

=== Business trends ===
The key trends of Shell are (as at the financial year ending 31 December):

Year	Revenue (US$ bn)	Net income (US$ bn)	Employees
2017	305	12.9	86,000
2018	388	23.3	82,000
2019	344	15.8	83,000
2020	180	−21.6	87,000
2021	261	20.1	82,000
2022	381	42.3	87,000
2023	316	19.3	87,000
2024	284	16.5	98,000
2025	267	18.1	96,000

=== Management ===
On 4 August 2005, the board of directors announced the appointment of Jorma Ollila, chairman and CEO of Nokia at the time, to succeed Aad Jacobs as the company's non-executive chairman on 1 June 2006. Ollila is the first Shell chairman to be neither Dutch nor British. Other non-executive directors include Maarten van den Bergh, Wim Kok, Nina Henderson, Lord Kerr, Adelbert van Roxe, and Christine Morin-Postel.

Since 3 January 2014, Ben van Beurden has been CEO of Shell. His predecessor was Peter Voser who became CEO of Shell on 1 July 2009.

Following a career at the corporation, in locations such as Australia and Africa, Ann Pickard was appointed as the executive vice president of the Arctic at Royal Dutch Shell, a role that was publicized in an interview with McKinsey & Company in June 2014.

In January 2023, Wael Sawan succeeded Ben van Beurden as CEO.

== Name and logo ==
The name Shell is linked to the "Shell" Transport and Trading Company. In 1833, the founder's father, Marcus Samuel Sr., founded an import business to sell seashells to London collectors. When collecting seashell specimens in the Caspian Sea area in 1892, the younger Samuel realised there was potential in exporting lamp oil from the region and commissioned the world's first purpose-built oil tanker, the Murex (Latin for a type of snail shell), to enter this market; by 1907 the company had a fleet. Although for several decades the company had a refinery at Shell Haven on the Thames, there is no evidence of this having provided the name.

The Shell logo is one of the most familiar commercial symbols in the world. This logo is known as the "pecten" after the sea shell Pecten maximus (the giant scallop), on which its design is based. The yellow and red colours used are thought to relate to the colours of the flag of Spain, as Shell built early service stations in California, previously a Spanish colony. The current revision of the logo was designed by Raymond Loewy in 1971.

The slash was removed from the name "Royal Dutch/Shell" in 2005, concurrent with moves to merge the two legally separate companies (Royal Dutch and Shell) to the single legal entity which exists today.

On 15 November 2021, Royal Dutch Shell plc announced plans to change its name to Shell plc.

=== Logo evolution ===
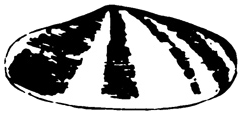
1900–04

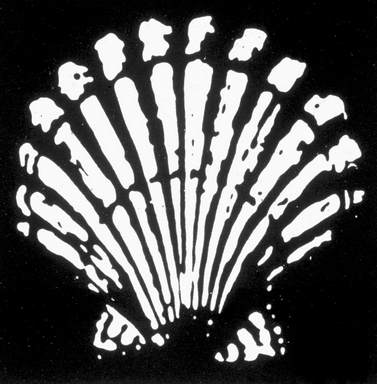
1904–09

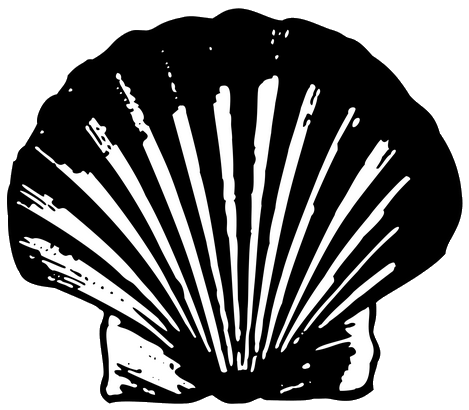
1909–30

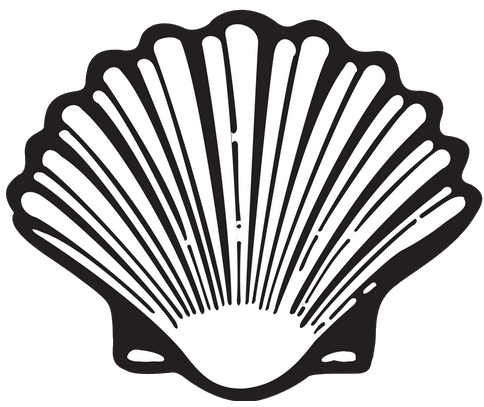
1930–48

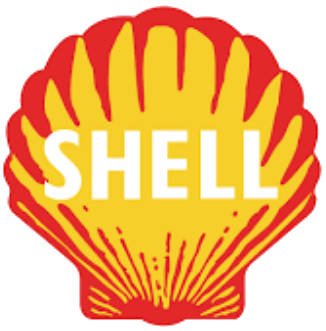
1948–55

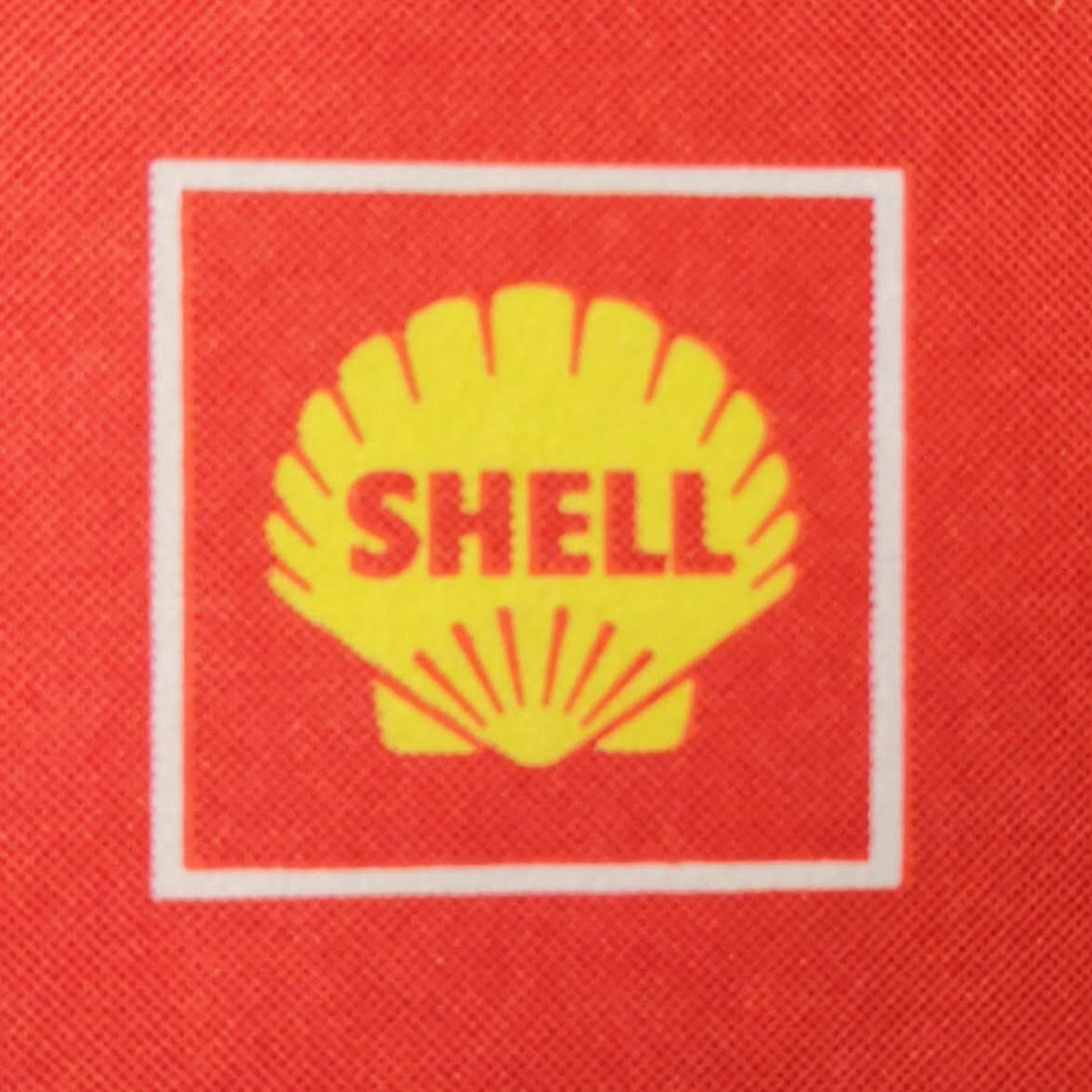
1955–70

1971–present (Note: Designed by Raymond Loewy.)

2019–present (wordmark)

== Operations ==
Sales by business (2022)
Business	share
Chemicals and Products	37.9%
Service stations	31.6%
Integrated Gas	14.4%
Renewable and Energy Solutions	13.9%
Upstream	2.2%
Corporate Segment	0.0%

=== Business groupings ===
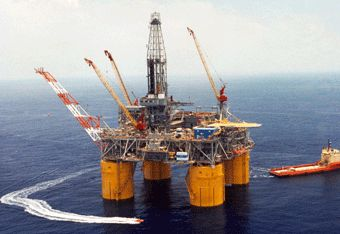
Mars oil platform operated as a joint venture between Shell and BP in the Gulf of Mexico.

Shell is organised into four major business groupings:

- Upstream – manages the upstream business. It searches for and recovers crude oil and natural gas and operates the upstream and midstream infrastructure necessary to deliver oil and gas to the market. Its activities are organised primarily within geographic units, although there are some activities that are managed across the business or provided through support units.
- Integrated Gas and New Energies – manages to liquefy natural gas, converting gas to liquids and low-carbon opportunities.
- Downstream – manages Shell's manufacturing, distribution, and marketing activities for oil products and chemicals. Manufacturing and supply include refinery, supply, and shipping of crude oil.
- Projects and technology – manages the delivery of Shell's major projects, provides technical services and technology capability covering both upstream and downstream activities. It is also responsible for providing functional leadership across Shell in the areas of health, safety and environment, and contracting and procurement.

=== Oil and gas activities ===
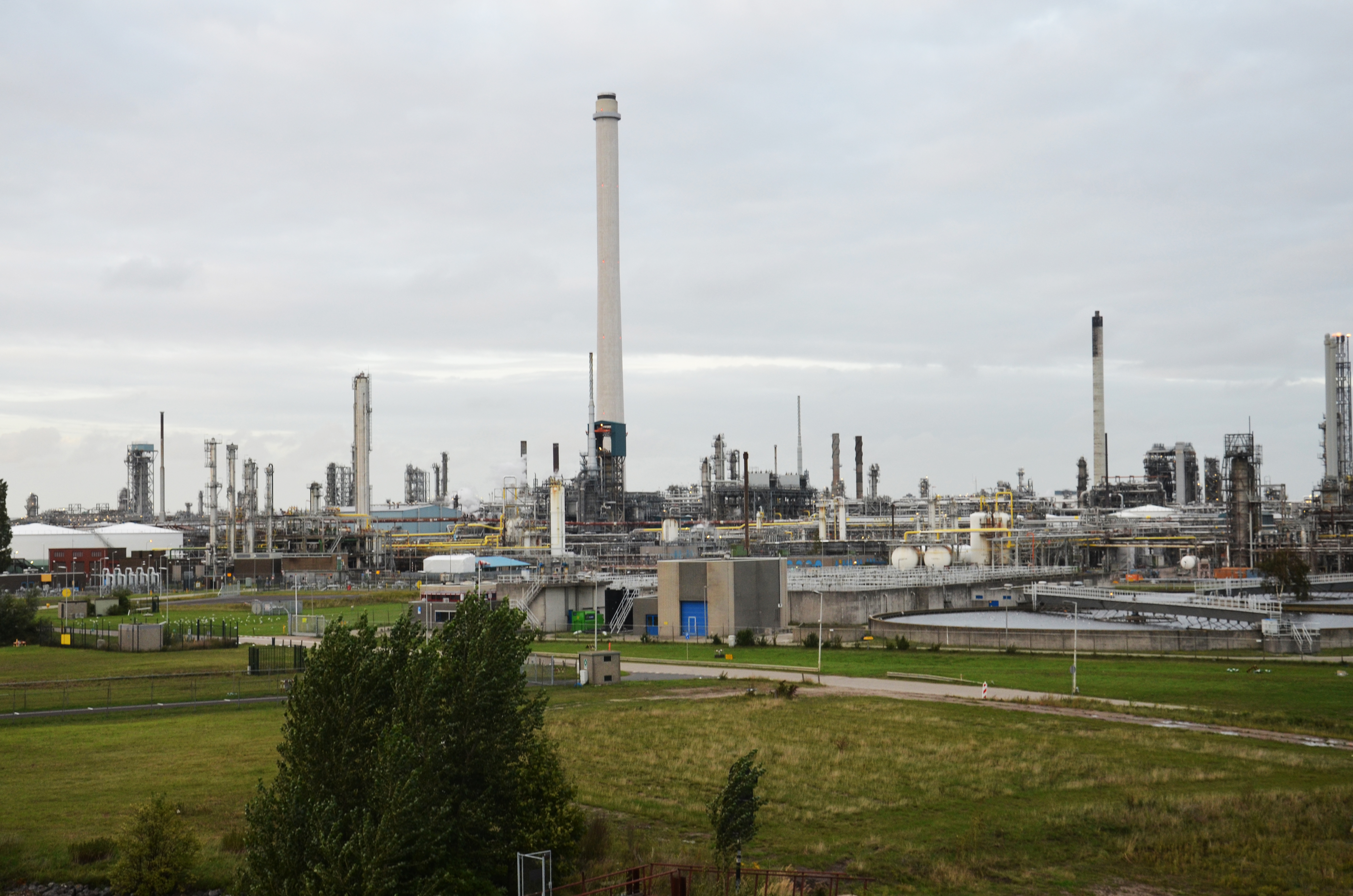
Europe's largest refinery, Shell Pernis, in Rotterdam, 2019

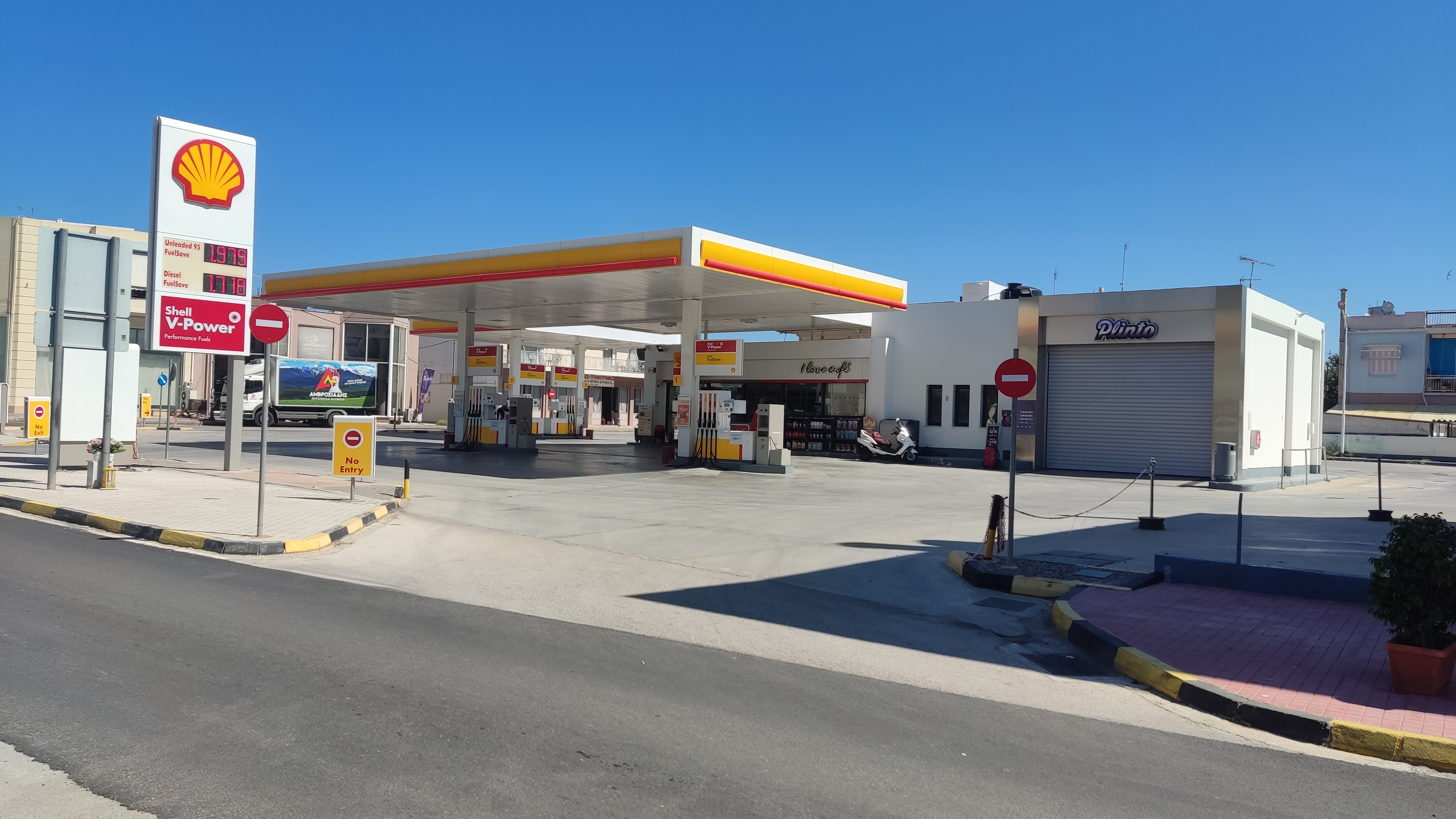
Filling station in Argos, Peloponnese owned by Shell. Shell and local subsidiaries own and operate thousands of filling stations worldwide.

Shell's primary business is the management of a vertically integrated oil company. The development of technical and commercial expertise in all stages of this vertical integration, from the initial search for oil (exploration) through its harvesting (production), transportation, refining and finally trading and marketing established the core competencies on which the company was founded. Similar competencies were required for natural gas, which has become one of the most important businesses in which Shell is involved, and which contributes a significant proportion of the company's profits. While the vertically integrated business model provided significant economies of scale and barriers to entry, each business now seeks to be a self-supporting unit without subsidies from other parts of the company.

Traditionally, Shell was a heavily decentralised business worldwide (especially in the downstream) with companies in over 100 countries, each of which operated with a high degree of independence. The upstream tended to be far more centralised with much of the technical and financial direction coming from the central offices in The Hague. The upstream oil sector is also commonly known as the "exploration and production" sector.

Downstream operations, which now also includes the chemicals business, generate the majority of Shell's profits worldwide and is known for its global network of more than 40,000 petrol stations and its various oil refineries. The downstream business, which in some countries also included oil refining, generally included a retail petrol station network, lubricants manufacture and marketing, industrial fuel and lubricants sales, and a host of other product/market sectors such as LPG and bitumen. The practice in Shell was that these businesses were essentially local and that they were best managed by local "operating companies" – often with middle and senior management reinforced by expatriates.

== Operations by region ==
Sales by region (2022)
Region	share
Asia, Oceania, Africa	33.2%
United States	22.8%
Europe	22.5%
United Kingdom	13.2%
Other Americas	8.3%

=== Arctic ===
==== Kulluk oil rig ====
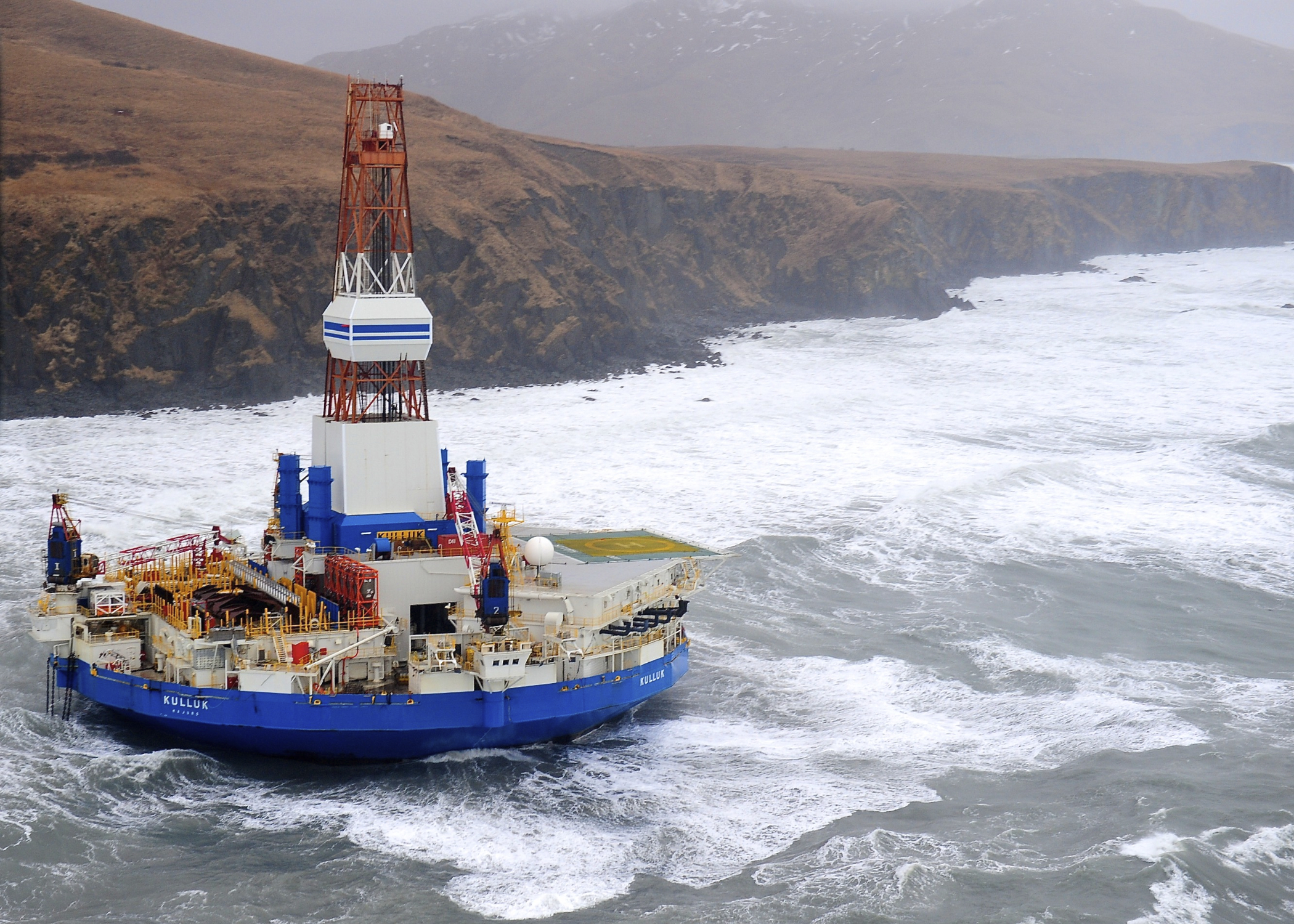
The conical drilling unit Kulluk, 2013

Following the purchase of an offshore lease in 2005, Shell initiated its US$4.5 billion Arctic drilling program in 2006, after the corporation purchased the "Kulluk" oil rig and leased the Noble Discoverer drillship. At inception, the project was led by Pete Slaiby, a Shell executive who had previously worked in the North Sea. However, after the purchase of a second offshore lease in 2008, Shell only commenced drilling work in 2012, due to the refurbishment of rigs, permit delays from the relevant authorities and lawsuits. The plans to drill in the Arctic led to protests from environmental groups, particularly Greenpeace; furthermore, analysts in the energy field, as well as related industries, also expressed skepticism due to perceptions that drilling in the region is "too dangerous because of harsh conditions and remote locations".

Further problems hampered the Arctic project after the commencement of drilling in 2012, as Shell dealt with a series of issues that involved air permits, Coast Guard certification of a marine vessel, and severe damage to essential oil-spill equipment. Additionally, difficult weather conditions resulted in the delay of drilling during mid-2012 and the already dire situation was exacerbated by the "Kulluk" incident at the end of the year. Shell had invested nearly US$5 billion by this stage of the project.

As the Kulluk oil rig was being towed to the American state of Washington to be serviced in preparation for the 2013 drilling season, a winter storm on 27 December 2012 caused the towing crews, as well as the rescue service, to lose control of the rig. As of 1 January 2013, the Kulluk was grounded off the coast Sitkalidak Island, near the eastern end of Kodiak Island. Following the accident, a Fortune magazine contacted Larry McKinney, the executive director at the Harte Research Institute for Gulf of Mexico Studies at Texas A&M, and he explained that "A two-month delay in the Arctic is not a two-month delay ... A two-month delay could wipe out the entire drilling season".

It was unclear if Shell would recommence drilling in mid-2013, following the "Kulluk" incident, and, in February 2013, the corporation stated that it would "pause" its closely watched drilling project off the Alaskan coast in 2013, and will instead prepare for future exploration. In January 2014, the corporation announced the extension of the suspension of its drilling program in the Arctic, with chief executive van Beurden explaining that the project is "under review" due to both market and internal issues.

A June 2014 interview with Pickard indicated that, following a forensic analysis of the problems encountered in 2012, Shell will continue with the project and Pickard stated that she perceives the future of the corporation activity in the Arctic region as a long-term "marathon". Pickard stated that the forensic "look back" revealed "there was an on/off switch" and further explained:

In other words, don't spend the money unless you're sure you're going to have the legal environment to go forward. Don't spend the money unless you're sure you're going to have the permit. No, I can't tell you that I'm going to have that permit until June, but we need to plan like we're going to have that permit in June. And so probably the biggest lesson is to make sure we could smooth out the on/off switches wherever we could and take control of our own destiny.

Based upon the interview with Pickard, Shell is approaching the project as an investment that will reap energy resources with a lifespan of around 30 years.

According to the Bureau of Ocean Energy Management report in 2015 the chances of a major spill in a deep-sea Arctic drilling is 75% before century's end.

==== Kodiak Island ====
In 2010, Greenpeace activists painted "No Arctic Drilling" using spilled BP oil on the side of a ship in the Gulf of Mexico that was en route to explore for Arctic oil for Shell. At the protest, Phil Radford of Greenpeace called for "President Obama [to] ban all offshore oil drilling and call for an end to the use of oil in our cars by 2030".

On 16 March 2012, 52 Greenpeace activists from five different countries boarded Fennica and Nordica, multipurpose icebreakers chartered to support Shell's drilling rigs near Alaska. Around the same time period, a reporter for Fortune magazine spoke with Edward Itta, an Inupiat leader and the former mayor of the North Slope Borough, who expressed that he was conflicted about Shell's plans in the Arctic, as he was concerned that an oil spill could destroy the Inupiat peoples hunting-and-fishing culture, but his borough also received major tax revenue from oil and gas production; additionally, further revenue from energy activity was considered crucial to the future of the living standard in Itta's community.

In July 2012, Greenpeace activists shut down 53 Shell petrol stations in Edinburgh and London in a protest against the company's plans to drill for oil in the Arctic. Greenpeace's "Save the Arctic" campaign aims to prevent oil drilling and industrial fishing in the Arctic by declaring the uninhabited area around the North Pole a global sanctuary.

A review was announced after the Kulluk oil rig ran aground near Kodiak Island in December 2012.

In response, Shell filed lawsuits to seek injunctions from possible protests, and Benjamin Jealous of the NAACP and Radford argued that the legal action was "trampling Americans' rights". According to Greenpeace, Shell lodged a request with Google to take down video footage of a Greenpeace protest action that occurred at the Shell-sponsored Formula One (F1) Belgian Grand Prix on 25 August 2013, in which "SaveTheArctic.org" banners appear at the winners' podium ceremony. In the video, the banners rise up automatically—activists controlled their appearance with the use of four radio car antennas—revealing the website URL, alongside an image that consists of half of a polar bear's head and half of the Shell logo.

Shell then announced a "pause" in the timeline of the project in early 2013 and, in September 2015, the corporation announced the extension of the suspension of its drilling program in the Arctic.

==== Polar Pioneer rig ====
A June 2014 interview with the corporation's new executive vice president of the Arctic indicated that Shell will continue with its activity in the region.

In Seattle protests began in May 2015 in response to the news that the Port of Seattle made an agreement with Shell to berth rigs at the Port's Terminal 5 during the off-season of oil exploration in Alaskan waters. The arrival of Shell's new Arctic drilling vessel, Polar Pioneer (IMO number: 8754140), a semi-submersible offshore drilling rig, was greeted by large numbers of environmental protesters paddling kayaks in Elliott Bay.

On 6 May 2015, it was reported that during a coast guard inspection of Polar Pioneer, a piece of anti-pollution gear failed, resulting in fines and delay of the operation. Oil executives from Total and Eni interviewed by the New York Times, expressed scepticism about Shell's new ambitions for offshore drilling in the Arctic, and cited economic and environmental hurdles. ConocoPhillips and Equinor (formerly Statoil) suspended Arctic drilling earlier, after Shell's failed attempt in 2012.

=== Australia ===
On 20 May 2011, Shell's final investment decision for the world's first floating liquefied natural gas (FLNG) facility was finalized following the discovery of the remote offshore Prelude field—located off Australia's northwestern coast and estimated to contain about 3 trillion cubic feet of natural gas equivalent reserves—in 2007. FLNG technology is based on liquefied natural gas (LNG) developments that were pioneered in the mid-20th century and facilitates the exploitation of untapped natural gas reserves located in remote areas, often too small to extract any other way.

The floating vessel to be used for the Prelude field, known as Prelude FLNG, is promoted as the longest floating structure in the world and will take in the equivalent of 110,000 barrels of oil per day in natural gas—at a location 200 km (125 miles) off the coast of Western Australia—and cool it into liquefied natural gas for transport and sale in Asia. The Prelude is expected to start producing LNG in 2017—analysts estimated the total cost of construction at more than US$12 billion.

Following the decision by the Shell fuel corporation to close its Geelong Oil Refinery in Australia in April 2013, a third consecutive annual loss was recorded for Shell's Australian refining and fuel marketing assets. Revealed in June 2013, the writedown is worth A$203 million and was preceded by a A$638m writedown in 2012 and a A$407m writedown in 2011, after the closure of the Clyde Refinery in Sydney.

In February 2014, Shell sold its Australian refinery and petrol stations for US$2.6 billion (A$2.9 billion) to Swiss company Vitol.

At the time of the downstream sale to Vitol, Shell was expected to continue investment into Australian upstream projects, with projects that involve Chevron Corp., Woodside Petroleum and Prelude. In June 2014, Shell sold 9.5% of its 23.1% stake in Woodside Petroleum and advised that it had reached an agreement for Woodside to buy back 9.5% of its shares at a later stage. Shell became a major shareholder in Woodside after a 2001 takeover attempt was blocked by then federal Treasurer Peter Costello and the corporation has been open about its intention to sell its stake in Woodside as part of its target to shed assets. At a general body meeting, held on 1 August 2014, 72 percent of shareholders voted to approve the buy-back, short of the 75 percent vote that was required for approval. A statement from Shell read: "Royal Dutch Shell acknowledges the outcome of Woodside Petroleum Limited's shareholders' negative vote on the selective buy-back proposal. Shell is reviewing its options in relation to its remaining 13.6 percent holding".

=== Brunei ===
Brunei Shell Petroleum (BSP) is a joint venture between the Government of Brunei and Shell. The British Malayan Petroleum Company (BMPC), owned by Royal Dutch Shell, first found commercial amounts of oil in 1929. It currently produces 350,000 barrels of oil and gas equivalent per day. BSP is the largest oil and gas company in Brunei, a sector which contributes 90% of government revenue. In 1954, the BMPC in Seria had a total of 1,277 European and Asian staff.

=== China ===
The company has upstream operations in unconventional oil and gas in China. Shell has a joint venture with PetroChina at the Changbei tight gas field in Shaanxi, which has produced natural gas since 2008. The company has also invested in exploring for shale oil in Sichuan. The other unconventional resource which Shell invested in in China was shale. The company was an early entrant in shale oil exploration in China but scaled down operations in 2014 due to difficulties with geology and population density. It has a joint venture to explore for oil shale in Jilin through a joint venture with Jilin Guangzheng Mineral Development Company Limited.

In May 2024, Shell announced an exit from China power market business to focus on more profitable operations.

==== Hong Kong ====
Shell has been active in Hong Kong for a century, providing Retail, LPG, Commercial Fuel, Lubricants, Bitumen, Aviation, Marine and Chemicals services, and products. Shell also sponsored the first Hong Kong-built aircraft, Inspiration, for its around-the-world trip.

=== India ===
Shell India has inaugurated its new lubricants laboratory at its Technology Centre in Bangalore.

Shell's operations in India include liquefied natural gas (LNG), natural gas distribution, fuel retailing and lubricants. Its presence in the natural gas sector is centred on the Hazira LNG terminal in Gujarat, which began operations in 2005. The terminal receives imported LNG for regasification and distribution to customers in India.

Shell also supplies imported LNG to industrial and commercial customers in India, including companies in the fertilizer and energy-intensive manufacturing sectors. Its gas business forms part of India's wider LNG import market, which supplies domestic demand that cannot be met entirely by locally produced natural gas.

In the downstream sector, Shell operates petrol stations in India, selling petrol and diesel in competition with state-owned and other private-sector fuel retailers. The company also participates in the lubricants market. In July 2025, Shell acquired Raj Petro Specialties, an Indian manufacturer of specialty oils, lubricants and other petroleum-based products, expanding its presence in the country's specialty products sector.

=== Indonesia ===
Shell started operating in Indonesia since 1928. Shell started operating gas stations in Indonesia since 1 November 2005. Its first gas station was located in Lippo Karawaci, Tangerang. On 1 March 2006, Shell opened a gas station in Jakarta located on Jalan S. Parman (Slipi). As of 2022, the fuels that Shell sells in Indonesia are Shell Super, Shell V-Power, Shell V-Power Nitro+, Shell V-Power Diesel and Shell Diesel Extra.

=== Ireland ===
Shell first started trading in Ireland in 1902. Shell E&P Ireland (SEPIL) (previously Enterprise Energy Ireland) is an Irish exploration and production subsidiary of Royal Dutch Shell. Its headquarters are on Leeson Street in Dublin. It was acquired in May 2002. Its main project is the Corrib gas project, a large gas field off the northwest coast, for which Shell has encountered controversy and protests in relation to the onshore pipeline and licence terms.

In 2005, Shell disposed of its entire retail and commercial fuels business in Ireland to Topaz Energy Group. This included depots, company-owned petrol stations and supply agreements stations throughout the island of Ireland. The retail outlets were re-branded as Topaz in 2008/9.

The Topaz fuel network was subsequently acquired in 2015 by Couchetard and these stations began re-branding to Circle K in 2018.

=== Italy ===
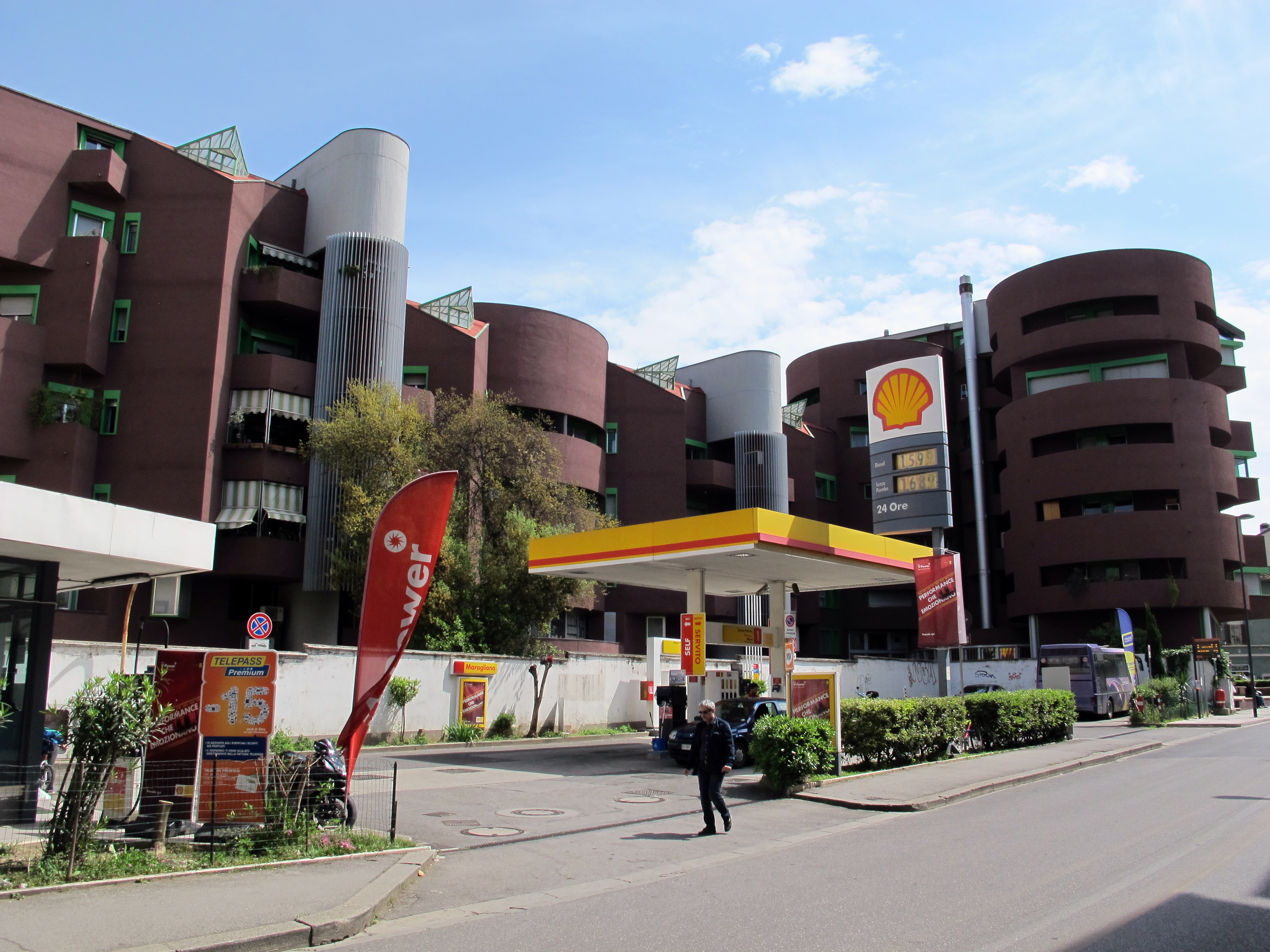
Shell service station in San Jacopino (Florence)

Shell's activities in Italy began on 13 July 1912, with the creation of "Nafta", based in La Spezia, founded after taking advantage of the weakness of the former Standard Oil Trust, dissolved the previous year.

During the First World War, Nafta abandoned the private sector, focusing on the war supplies to the Italian state. During the conflict, the company expanded, with the opening of new plants in Naples and Augusta and, after the end of hostilities, with the exploitation of further internal deposits.

In the first post-war period, the company controlled the Italian internal market together with the SIAP, the local branch of the Standard of New Jersey (Esso). In 1921, under pressure from the CEO Giovanni Attilio Pozzo (then also elected president in 1923), the share capital was increased reaching 100 million lire. The products sold at the time included "Bentero Shell" and "Aureola Petroli".

In 1922, despite the difficult economic situation of the country, the company grew, and the new Vado Ligure plant was inaugurated. The inauguration, however, caused a short political clash between the Prime Minister Facta and the socialist deputy Tonello, who in a parliamentary question harshly criticized the official telegram sent by Facta to "Nafta" on the occasion of the ceremony. In the same year, the works for a coastal system in Venice also continued.

The birth of Agip created some disagreements between Nafta and the Ministry of the National Economy, which in 1926 asked the Prefects to subordinate the release of new concessions for the plant of petrol stations to an approval estimate of Agip; the question was resolved peacefully in 1927 on the initiative of the Italian company itself.

At the end of the decade, taking advantage of a particularly advantageous legislation, the company launched into the refining sector, with the establishment of subsidiary companies in La Spezia.

On 27 April 1939, Pozzo left "Nafta", after twenty years at the head of the company. The company controlled about 20% of the Italian market at the time.

On 8 August 1940, following Italy's entry into the Second World War, Nafta was seized and placed under the management of Agip, followed the following year by the US companies operating in Italy (SIAP, Vacuum, Texaco). On 30 July 1942 foreign oil companies were officially transferred to Agip, although the integration of their activities was somewhat complex and remained substantially unfinished. On 22 October 1945, after the end of hostilities, the measures were abandoned and the NAFTA and the other companies, under the guidance of the Italian Petroli Committee, returned to normal activity.

In 1949 the company, now fully restored, was renamed "Shell Italiana S.p.A". with a share capital of more than 2 billion lira. Still in the early 1960s, Shell covered about 20% of the Italian oil needs.

The Italian Shell was the first company to be advertised with Carosello.

In 1959 the company purchased the former Condor refinery of Rho and in 1967 it built a large plant in Taranto, whose works began in 1964 with an initial investment of 25 billion lire.

Shell remained active in the country until April 1974 when, following difficulties in the oil sector caused by the Kippur War and the general conditions of the Italian economy, now not very favorable, the old company was sold to Eni, which became Italiana Petroli (IP). The company then returned to the fuel distribution in 1980, with the acquisition of the Conoco network, while in 1987 the joint venture with Montedison which led to the creation of MonteShell.

In July 2014 Shell gave its network of service stations and fuel deposits in Italy to the Kuwait Petroleum Italia (Q8).

In 2022 an agreement was announced with the Pad Multiegy company, for the brand to be restored and Shell products to be sold in over 500 Italian service stations, the first of which was inaugurated in March 2022.

In Italy today Shell operates through Shell Italia S.p.A. controlled by Shell Italia Finanza S.p.A. The main locations are in Sesto San Giovanni and Rome.

=== Malaysia ===
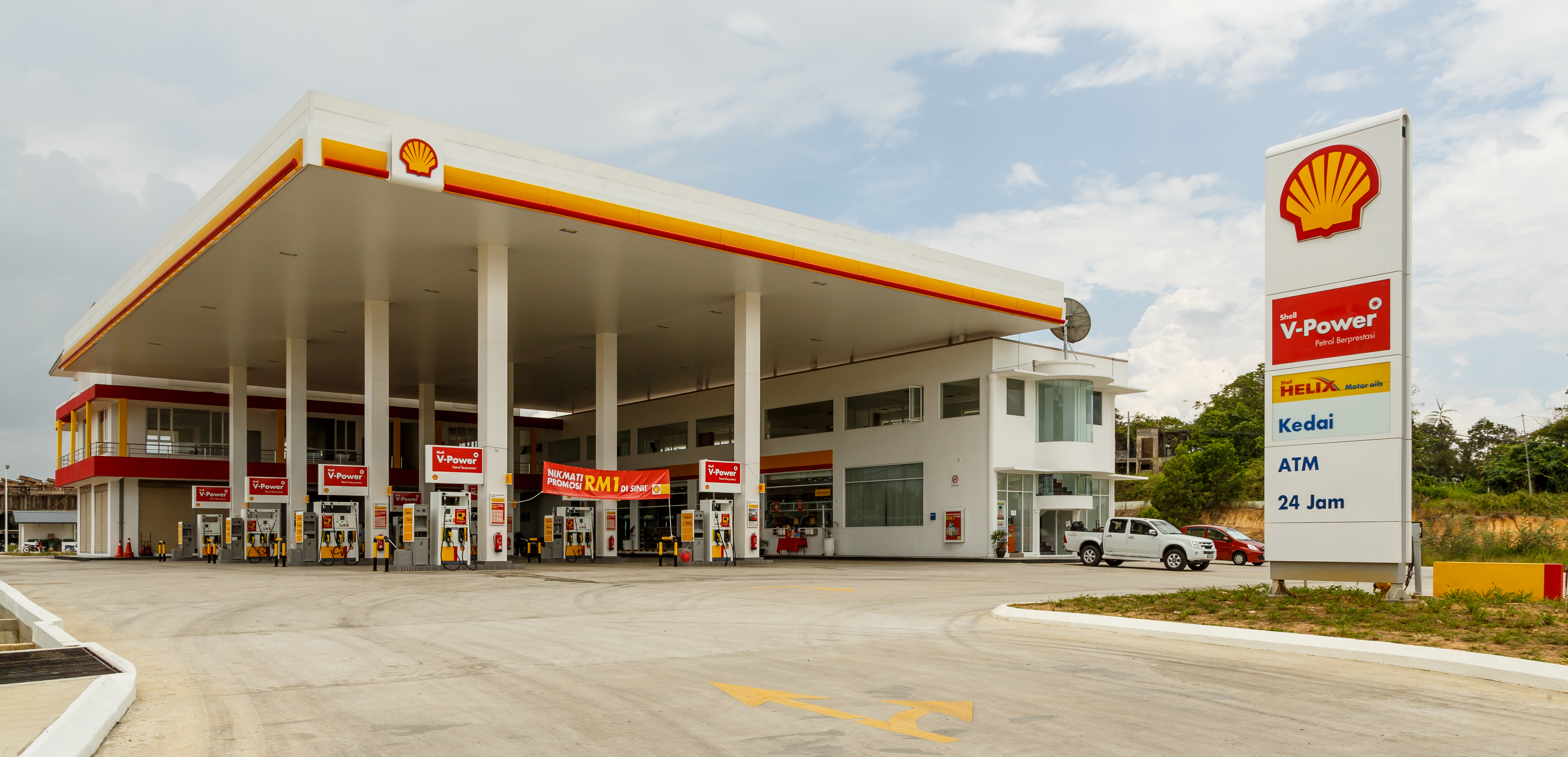
A Shell filling station in Sabah, Malaysia

Shell discovered the first oil well in Borneo in 1910, in Miri, Sarawak. Today, the oil well is a state monument known as the Grand Old Lady. In 1914, following this discovery, Shell built Borneo's first oil refinery and laid a submarine pipeline in Miri.

=== Nigeria ===
Shell began production in Nigeria in 1958. In Nigeria, Shell told US diplomats that it had placed staff in all the main ministries of the government. Shell continues however upstream activities/extracting crude oil in the oil-rich Niger Delta as well as downstream/commercial activities in South Africa. In June 2013, the company announced a strategic review of its operations in Nigeria, hinting that assets could be divested. In August 2014, the company disclosed it was in the process of finalizing the sale of its interests in four Nigerian oil fields. On 29 January 2021 a Dutch court ruled that Shell was responsible for multiple oil leaks in Nigeria.

The actions of companies including Shell have led to extreme environmental issues in the Niger Delta. Many pipelines in the Niger Delta owned by Shell are old and corroded. Shell has acknowledged its responsibility for keeping the pipelines new but has also denied responsibility for environmental causes. The heavy contamination of the air, ground and water with toxic pollutants by the oil industry in the Niger Delta is often used as an example of ecocide. This has led to mass protests from the Niger Delta inhabitants, Amnesty International, and Friends of the Earth the Netherlands against Shell. It has also led to action plans to boycott Shell by environmental and human rights groups. In January 2013, a Dutch court rejected four out of five allegations brought against the firm over oil pollution in the Niger Delta but found a subsidiary guilty of one case of pollution, ordering compensation to be paid to a Nigerian farmer.

=== Nordic countries ===
On 27 August 2007, Shell and Reitan Group, the owner of the 7-Eleven brand in Scandinavia, announced an agreement to re-brand some 269 service stations across Norway, Sweden, Finland and Denmark, subject to obtaining regulatory approvals under the different competition laws in each country. In April 2010 Shell announced that the corporation is in process of trying to find a potential buyer for all of its operations in Finland and is doing similar market research concerning Swedish operations. In October 2010 Shell's gas stations and the heavy vehicle fuel supply networks in Finland and Sweden, along with a refinery located in Gothenburg, Sweden were sold to St1, a Finnish energy company, more precisely to its major shareholding parent company Keele Oy. Shell gas stations in Norway were taken over by St1 in 2015, but continued operating under the Shell brand until 2025.

=== North America ===
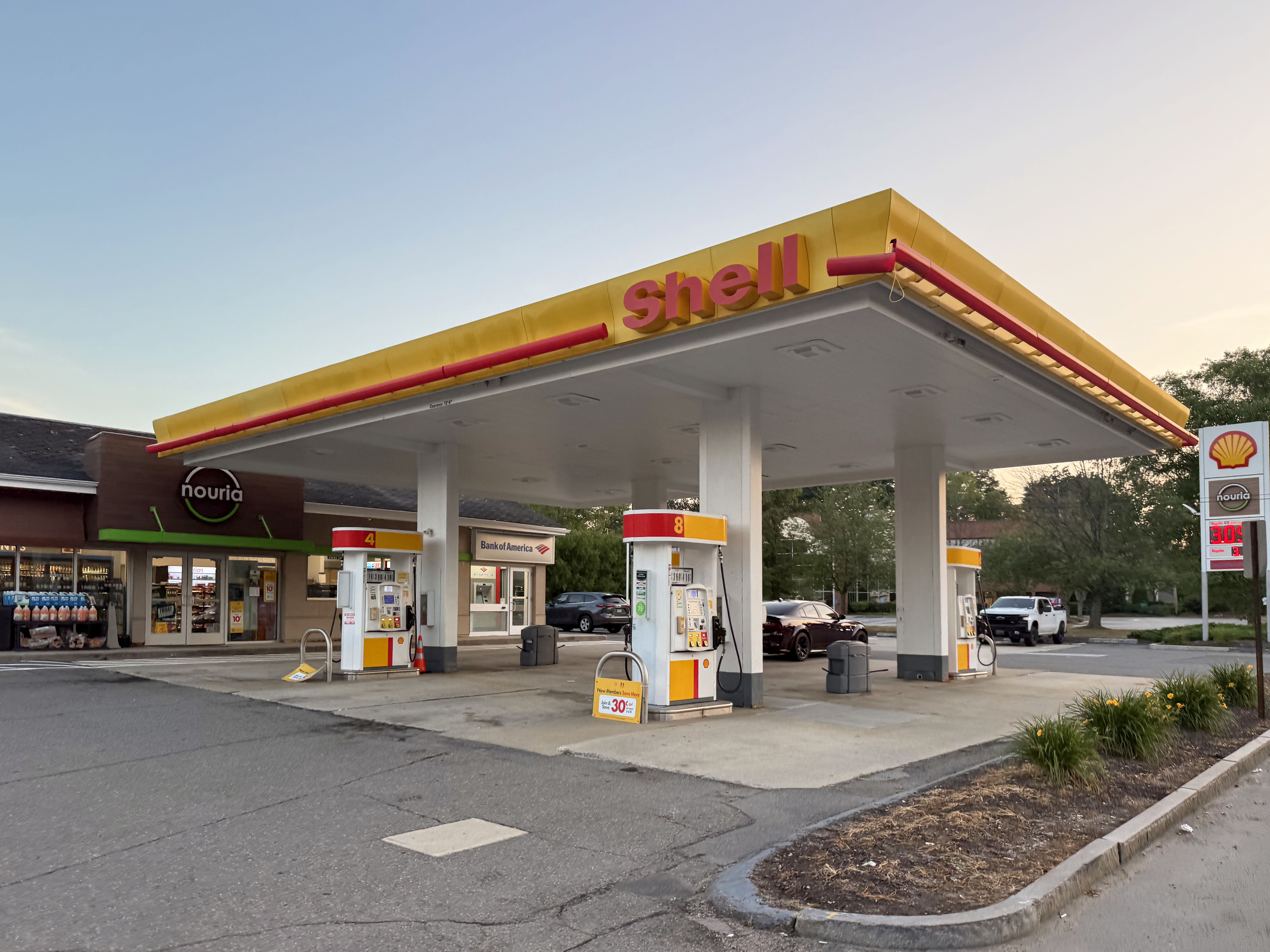
Shell gasoline station sign in Manchester, New Hampshire

Through most of Shell's early history, the Shell US business in the United States was substantially independent. Its stock was traded on the NYSE, and the group's central office had little direct involvement in running the operation. However, in 1984, Shell made a bid to purchase those shares of Shell Oil Company it did not own (around 30%) and, despite opposition from some minority shareholders which led to a court case, Shell completed the buyout for a sum of $5.7 billion.

=== Philippines ===
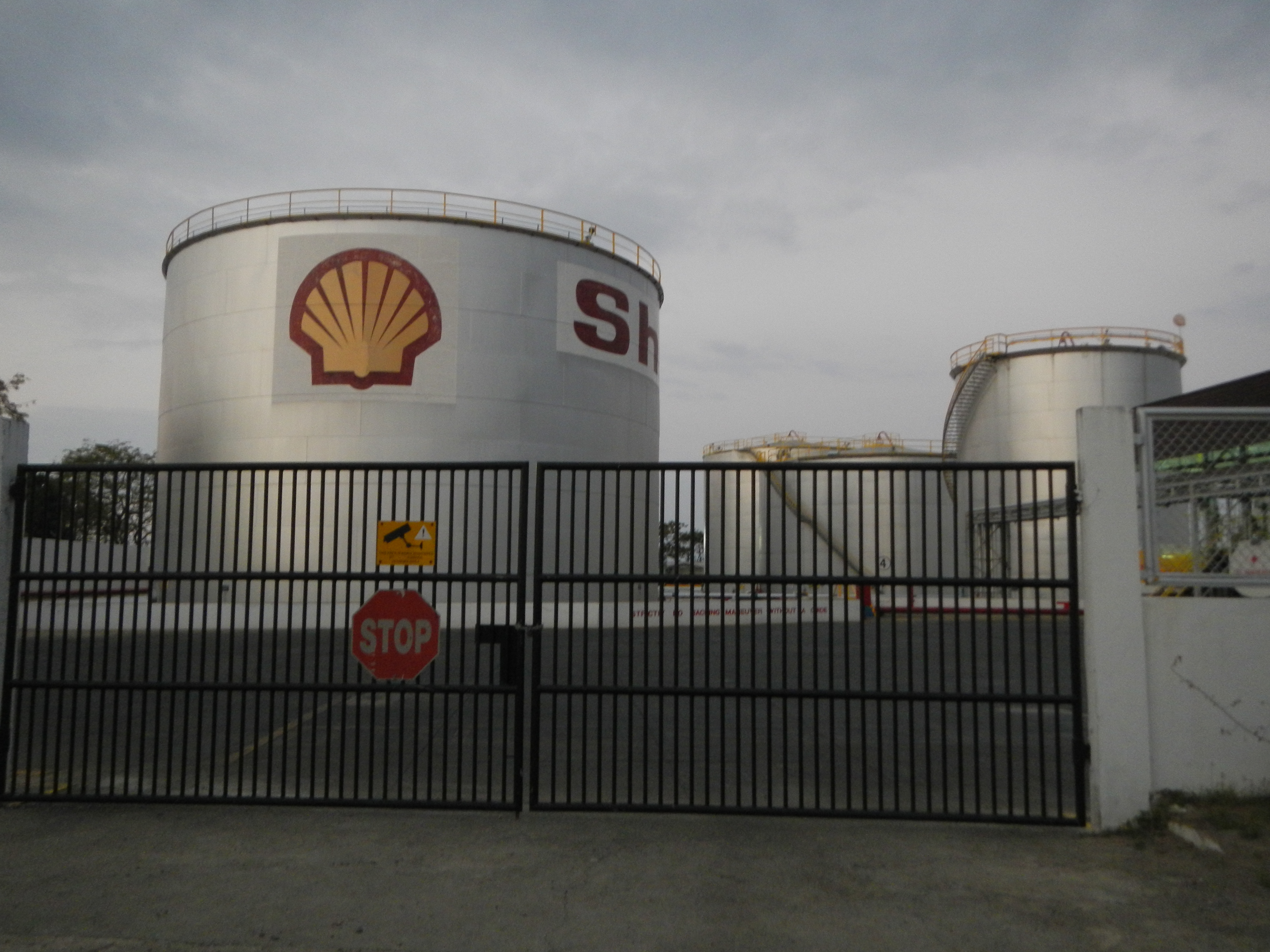
Shell oil depot (Poro Point, San Fernando, La Union, Philippines)

Royal Dutch Shell operates in the Philippines under its subsidiary, Shell Pilipinas Corporation or SPC. Its headquarters is in Taguig and it has facilities in the Pandacan oil depot and other key locations.

In January 2010, the Bureau of Customs claimed 7.34 billion pesos worth of unpaid excise taxes against Pilipinas Shell for importing catalytic cracked gasoline (CCG) and light catalytic cracked gasoline (LCCG), stating that those imports were subject to tariff charges.

In August 2016, Pilipinas Shell filed an application to sell US$629 million worth of primary and secondary shares to the investing public (registration statement) with the SEC. This was a prelude to filing its IPO listing application with the Philippine Stock Exchange. On 3 November 2016, Pilipinas Shell Petroleum Corporation was officially listed on the Philippine Stock Exchange under the ticker symbol SHLPH after holding its initial public offering from 19 to 25 October of the same year.

Due to the economic slowdown caused by the COVID-19 pandemic on the global, regional and local economies, continually low refining margins, and competition from imported refined products, Pilipinas Shell announced in August 2020 that its 110,000 bbl/d refinery in Tabangao, Batangas, which had been operating since 1962, would be permanently closed and converted into an import terminal. The repurposed facility, the Shell Import Facility Tabangao (SHIFT), was inaugurated in June 2021.

Shell also participated in the Malampaya gas field through its subsidiary Shell Philippines Exploration B.V. (SPEX), which held a 45% operating interest and served as the project's operator. On 1 November 2022, Shell completed the sale of its interest in SPEX to Malampaya Energy XP Pte Ltd, a subsidiary of Prime Infrastructure Capital Inc., ending Shell's participation in the Malampaya project.

=== Russia ===
In February 2022, Shell exited all its joint ventures with Gazprom because of the 2022 Russian invasion of Ukraine and, in March 2022, Shell announced that it would stop buying oil from Russia and close all its service stations there. In April 2022, it emerged that Shell was to book up to $5 billion in impairment charges from exiting its interests in Russia.

=== Singapore ===
Singapore is the main centre for Shell's petrochemical operations in the Asia Pacific region. Shell Eastern Petroleum limited (SEPL) have their refinery located in Singapore's Pulau Bukom island. They also operate as Shell Chemicals Seraya in Jurong Island. In November 2020, Shell announced that, as part of efforts to curtail pollution emissions, it will cut its oil-processing capacity in Singapore.

=== South Africa ===
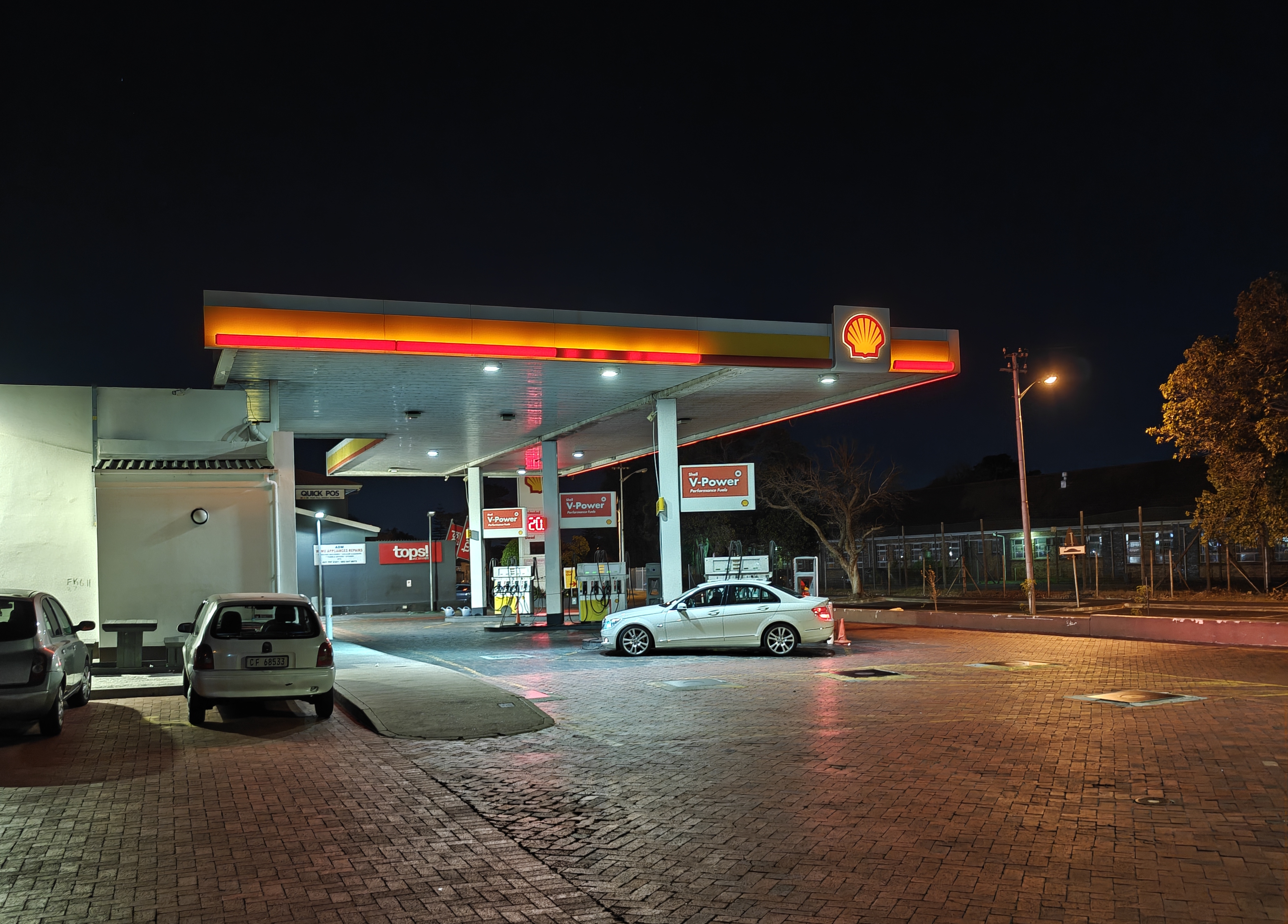
Shell gas station in Plumstead, Cape Town

Shell Downstream SA (SDSA) was created through a merger of Shell South Africa and BBBEE company Thebe Investment Corporation. The South African Department of Mineral Resources and Energy granted Shell exploration rights in the country, and it has been operating in South Africa since 1902.

The company also owns an oil refinery in Durban, which has been closed since the end of March 2022. On 6 May 2024, Shell indicated its intent to exit the South African downstream market. This includes its refining, transport, and retail offerings. It is as yet unknown what will happen to its gas stations.

Shell is a member of the Fuels Industry Association of South Africa (FIASA), and was one of its founding members when the organization launched in 1994.

=== Sri Lanka ===
Prior to the 1960s, Shell was one of the major multinational corporations operating in Sri Lanka, alongside companies like Esso and Caltex. These companies played pivotal roles in importing, distributing, and retailing petroleum products across the country. However, in 1962, under the leadership of Prime Minister Sirimavo Bandaranaike, the Sri Lankan government nationalized the assets of these oil giants. This move aimed to reduce foreign dominance in key economic sectors and led to the establishment of the Ceylon Petroleum Corporation (CPC), granting it exclusive rights over the importation, sale, export, and distribution of most petroleum products in Sri Lanka.

After a period of reduced presence, Shell re-entered the Sri Lankan market in the mid-1990s. In 1996, Shell acquired a 51% stake in the Colombo Gas Company for $37 million, marking its significant return to the country's energy sector. This acquisition led to the establishment of Shell Gas Lanka Limited, which managed the importation, storage, and distribution of liquefied petroleum gas (LPG) in Sri Lanka.

In recent years, Shell has signaled its intent to re-establish a presence in Sri Lanka's fuel retailing market. In collaboration with RM Parks and Tristar, Shell announced plans to introduce Shell-branded fuel stations in the country, marking a significant return to the Sri Lankan energy landscape. On 26 February 2025, Shell marked its return to Sri Lanka's fuel retail market by inaugurating its first Shell-branded fuel station in over six decades. This station is located at the B.S. Cooray Filling Station in Ambathale, Colombo District.

=== United Arab Emirates ===
Shell plc has interests in the United Arab Emirates' natural gas sector, including a 15% shareholding in ADNOC Gas Processing, an operating joint venture that supplies natural gas in the country.

In September 2023, ADNOC took a final investment decision on its Habshan carbon capture, utilisation and storage (CCUS) project, designed to capture and permanently store 1.5 million tons of carbon dioxide annually. In October 2023, ADNOC announced that it had selected Shell's CANSOLV carbon-capture technology for the project.

In July 2024, Shell Overseas Holdings Limited, a subsidiary of Shell plc, signed an agreement to acquire a 10% participating interest in ADNOC's Ruwais liquefied natural gas (LNG) project in Abu Dhabi. Shell International Trading Middle East Limited FZE also signed an agreement to purchase one million tons of LNG annually from the project. The facility comprises two planned liquefaction trains with a combined capacity of 9.6 million tons per year and is designed to use electric-powered liquefaction and a renewable power supply.

In November 2025, Shell International Trading Middle East Limited FZE signed a 15-year sales and purchase agreement with ADNOC for the delivery of up to one million tons of LNG annually, primarily from the Ruwais project. The agreement formalized an earlier preliminary agreement into a binding contract, with commercial operations at the facility scheduled to begin in the fourth quarter of 2028.

=== United Kingdom ===
In 2000, Shell launched a new UK Fuel card for business customers, replacing its existing Shell Gold card and introducing enhanced fleet-management features, including improved reporting and online account information. The service was supported through fuel-card providers such as UK Fuels (later part of Radius), which provided fleet payment and administration services.

In the UK sector of the North Sea Shell employs around 4,500 staff in Scotland as well as an additional 1,000 service contractors: however in August 2014 it announced it was laying off 250 of them, mainly in Aberdeen. Shell paid no UK taxes on its North Sea operations over the period 2018 to 2021.

== Alternative energy ==
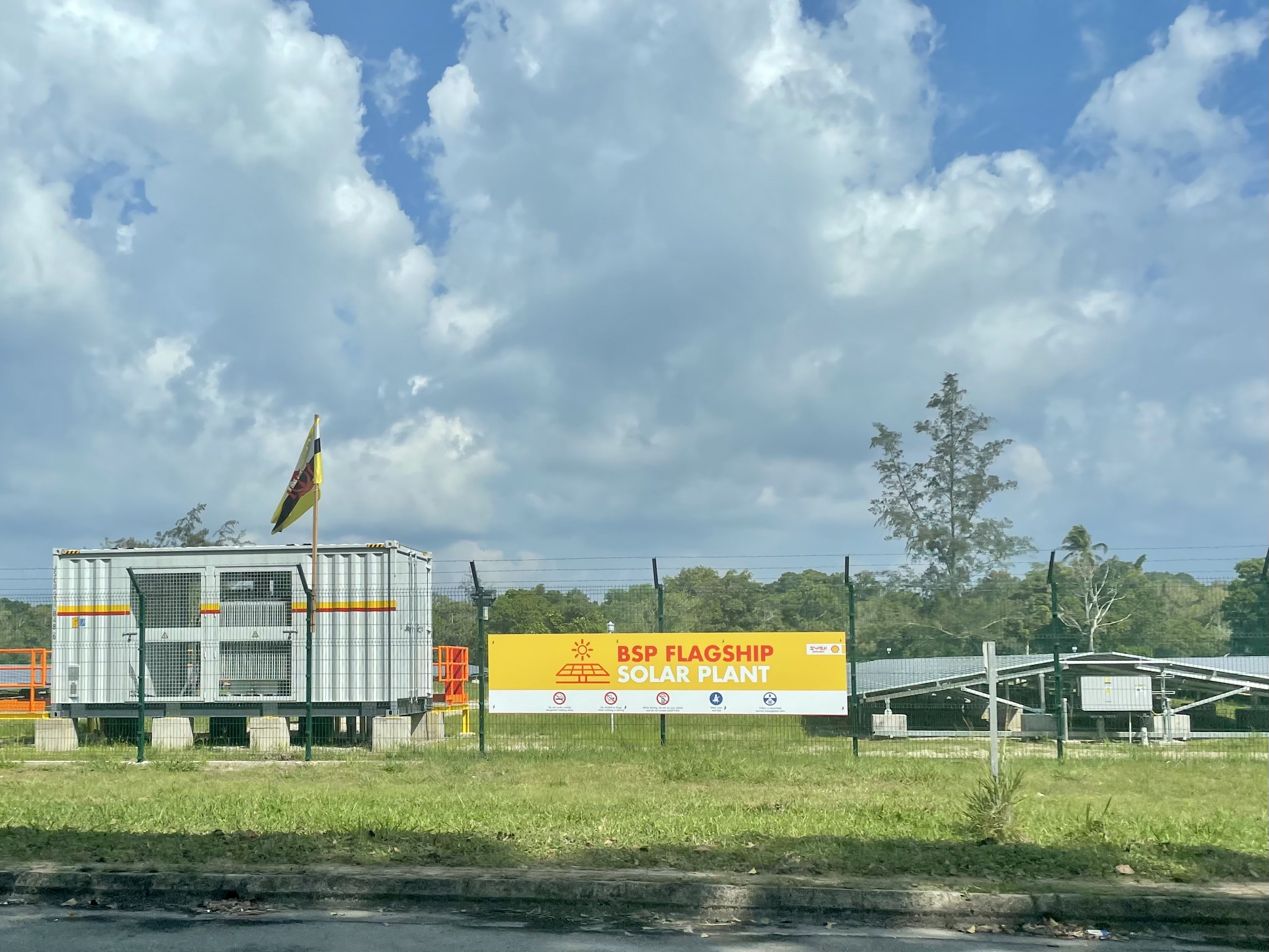
Brunei Shell Petroleum's flagship solar plant in Panaga, 2021

In the early 2000s Shell moved into alternative energy and there is now an embryonic "Renewables" business that has made investments in solar power, wind power, hydrogen, and forestry. The forestry business went the way of nuclear, coal, metals and electricity generation, and was disposed of in 2003. In 2006 Shell paid SolarWorld to take over its entire solar business and in 2008, the company withdrew from the London Array which when built was the world's largest offshore wind farm.

Shell also is involved in large-scale hydrogen projects. HydrogenForecast.com describes Shell's approach thus far as consisting of "baby steps", but with an underlying message of "extreme optimism". In 2015, the company announced plans to install hydrogen fuel pumps across Germany, planning on having 400 locations in operation by 2023.

Shell holds 44% of Raízen, a joint venture with Brazilian sugarcane producer Cosan which is the third-largest Brazil-based energy company by revenues and a major producer of ethanol. In 2015, the company partnered with Brazilian start-up company Insolar to install solar panels in Rio de Janeiro to deliver electricity to the Santa Marta neighbourhood.

Shell is the operator and major shareholder of The Shell Canada Quest Energy project, based within the Athabasca Oil Sands Project, located near Fort McMurray, Alberta. It holds a 60% share, alongside Chevron Canada Limited, which holds 20%, and Marathon Canadian Oil Sands Holding Limited, which holds the final 20%. Commercial operations launched in November 2015. It was the world's first commercial-scale oil and sand carbon capture and storage (CCS) project. It is expected to reduce CO_{2} emissions in Canada by 1.08 million tonnes per year.

In December 2016, Shell won the auction for the 700 MW Borssele III & IV offshore wind farms at a price of 5.45 c/kWh, beating 6 other consortia. In June 2018, it was announced that the company and its co-investor Partners Group had secured $1.5bn for the project, which also involves Eneco, Van Oord, and Mitsubishi/DGE.

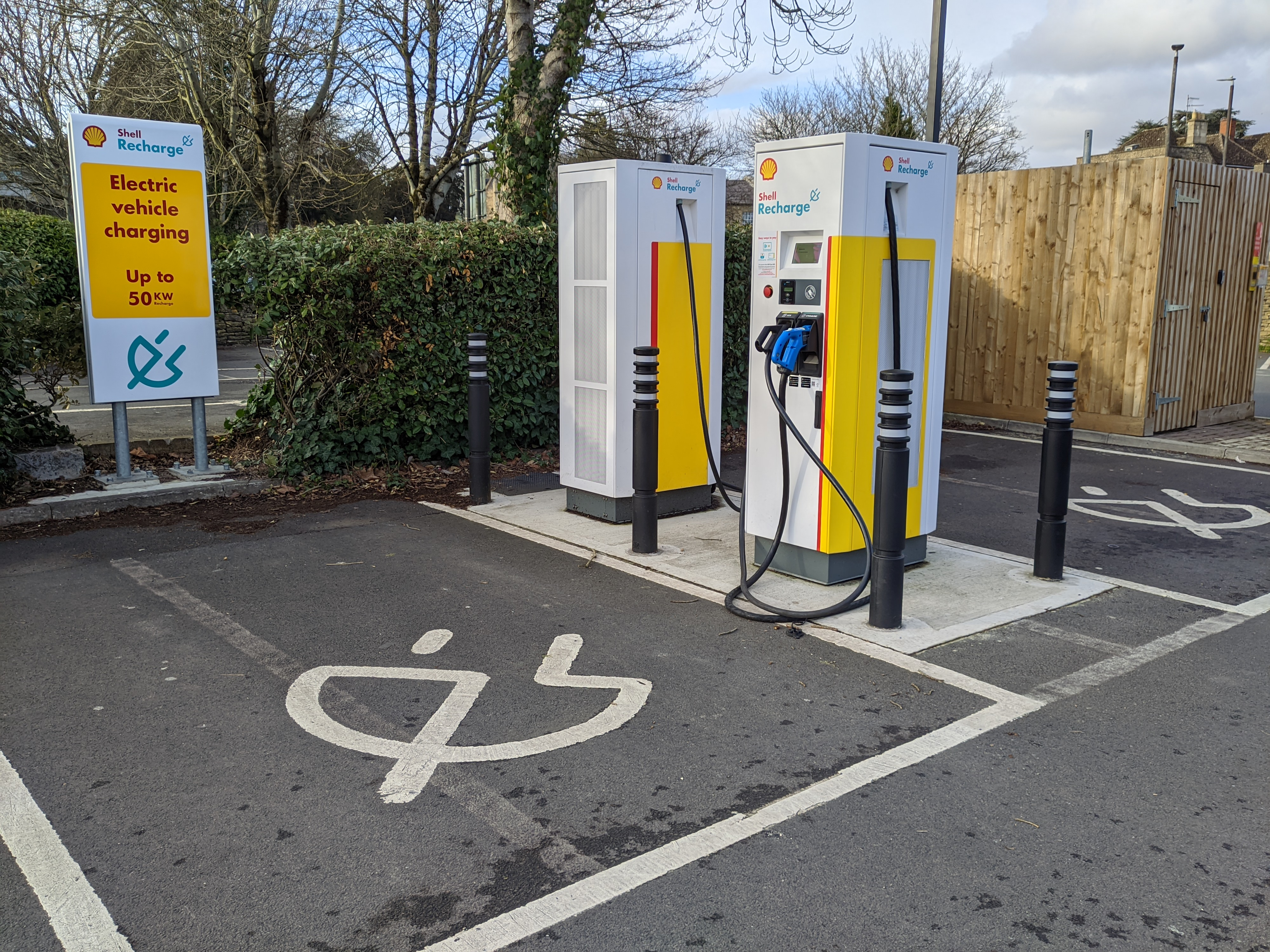
Shell Recharge rapid charger in the Cirencester Waitrose car park, 2023

In October 2017, it bought Europe's biggest vehicle charging network, "NewMotion".

In November 2017, Shell's CEO Ben van Beurden announced Shell's plan to cut half of its carbon emissions by 2050, and 20 percent by 2035. In this regard, Shell promised to spend $2 billion annually on renewable energy sources. Shell began to develop its wind energy segment in 2001, the company now operates six wind farms in the United States and is part of a plan to build two offshore wind farms in the Netherlands.

In December 2017, the company announced plans to buy UK household energy and broadband provider First Utility. In March 2019 it rebranded to Shell Energy and announced that all electricity would be supplied from renewable sources.

In December 2018, the company announced that it had partnered with SkyNRG to begin supplying sustainable aviation fuel to airlines operating out of San Francisco Airport (SFO), including KLM, SAS, and Finnair. In the same month, the company announced plans to double its renewable energy budget to investment in low-carbon energy to $4 billion US each year, with an aim to spend up to $2 billion US on renewable energy by 2021.

In January 2018, the company acquired a 44% interest in Silicon Ranch, a solar energy company run by Matt Kisber, as part of its global New Energies project. The company took over from Partners Group, paying up to an estimated $217 million for the minority interest.

In February 2019, the company acquired German solar battery company Sonnen. It first invested in the company in May 2018 as part of its New Energies project. As of late 2021, the company had 800 employees and has installed 70.000 home battery systems.

On 27 February 2019, the company acquired British VPP operator Limejump for an undisclosed amount.

In July 2019, Shell installed their first 150 kW electric car chargers at its London petrol stations with payments handled via SMOOV. They also plan to provide 350 kW chargers in Europe by entering into an agreement with IONITY.

On 26 January 2021, Shell said it would buy 100 per cent of Ubitricity, owner of the largest public charging network for electric vehicles in the United Kingdom, as the company expands its presence along the power supply chain. In 2023, Shell announced that it would rebrand its Ubitricity chargepoints under its Shell Recharge brand.

On 25 February 2021, Shell announced the acquisition of German Virtual Power Plant (VPP) company Next Kraftwerke for an undisclosed amount. Next Kraftwerke connects renewable electricity generation- and storage projects to optimize the usage of those assets. The company mostly operates in Europe.

In November 2022, it was announced Shell's wholly owned subsidiary, Shell Petroleum NV, had acquired the Odense-headquartered renewable natural gas producer, Nature Energy Biogas A/S for nearly US$2 billion.

== Ownership ==
Shell is mainly owned by institutional investors. The 10 largest shareholders of Shell plc at the end of 2024 were:

- Vanguard (3.218%)
- Norges Bank (3.213%)
- BlackRock Investment Management UK (2.664%)
- BlackRock Advisors UK (1.575%)
- State Street Global Advisors (1.543%)
- Legal & General (1.061%)
- Vanguard Global Advisors (1.058%)
- Geode Capital Management (0.7841%)
- Invesco Asset Management (0.7661%)

== Environmental issues ==
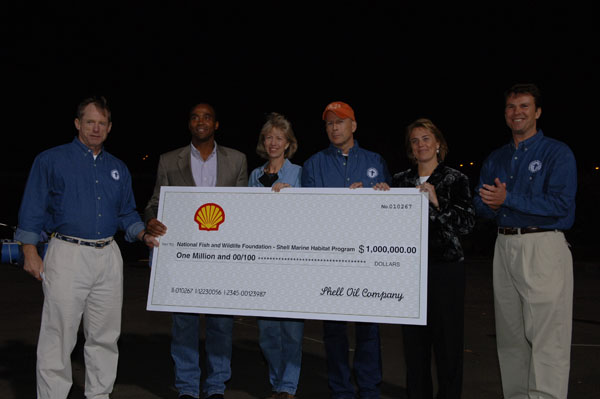
Presentation of Shell Oil Company contribution to National Fish and Wildlife Foundation at the Foundation's Celebrating the Great Outdoors fundraising event, 2005

=== Processing oil in the Amazon ===
Environmentalists have expressed concern that Shell is processing oil from the Amazon region of South America. In the United States, the Martinez refinery (CA) and the Puget Sound Refinery (WA) carry Amazonian oil. In 2015, 14% of the Martinez refinery's gross, at 19,570 barrels per day, came from the Amazon.

=== Operating in the hump back whale breeding grounds ===
In December 2021, Royal Dutch Shell decided to move ahead with seismic tests to explore for oil in humpback whale breeding grounds along South Africa's eastern coastline. On 3 December 2021, a South African high court struck down an urgent application brought by environmentalists to stop the project, which will involve a vessel regularly firing an air gun that produces a very powerful shock wave underwater to help map subsea geology. According to Greenpeace Africa and the South African Deep Sea Angling Association, this could cause "irreparable harm" to the marine environment, especially to migrating humpback whales in the area.

=== Climate change ===
Measured by both its own emissions, and the emissions of all the fossil fuels it sells, Shell was the ninth-largest corporate producer of greenhouse gas emissions in the period 1988–2015. The burning of the fossil fuels produced by Shell are responsible for 1.67% of global industrial greenhouse gas emissions from 1988 to 2015.

In the past, Shell has been a part of lobbying and trade groups that are against climate policy and promote climate skepticism.

In 2017, a public information film ("Climate of Concern") unseen for years resurfaced and showed Shell had clear grasp of global warming 26 years earlier but has not acted accordingly since, said critics. During the years of 2010–2018, only 1% of Shell's long-term investments were dedicated to sources of low-carbon energy such as wind and solar. In the years of 2015–2017, just 0.4% of its revenue was put towards low-carbon technology.

Shell failed to meet its own target in 2020 to spend $6 billion on renewable energy. In 2021, 30% of Shell's shareholders voted for a climate resolution filed by shareholder advocacy group Follow This. Still, it is estimated that Shell is not on track to meet its own investment target for 2025, and that the company needs to direct over half of its capital expenditures (nearly $10 billion per year) to zero carbon investments to meet its long-term net-zero targets. In April 2020, Shell announced plans to achieve net zero greenhouse gas emissions by 2050 or sooner. They also pledged to reduce carbon intensity of all energy products by 20% by 2030, and 45% by 2035 (compared to 2016 levels.) However, internal documents from the company released by the Democratic-led House committee reveal a private 2020 communication saying Shell does not have any plans to bring emissions to zero for next 10–20 years.

In March 2024, Shell CEO Wael Sawan announced that the company would moderate its near-term carbon emissions reduction targets, revising its reduction in net carbon intensity of third-party use of products down to 15% from 20% and dropping its target of a 45% reduction in carbon emissions by 2035 from a 2016 baseline.

Shell plc reported 58 million metric tons of emissions from its operations in 2024 with 50 million metric tons coming from Scope 1 sources and 8 million metric tons coming from Scope 2 sources. This high level of emissions is a result of Shell plc's main business activities, which include gas production and oil refining. Actually, industries with a high environmental risk account for 100% of the company's revenue, with consumable fuels making up 89.7% of this total. Even if Shell cut methane emissions by 19.5% and gas flaring by 14.3% in a single year, its green revenue is still only 0.2%. Additionally, there are extremely high environmental risks associated with the company's value chain, particularly with regard to greenhouse gas emissions and ecosystem change.

Shell's company faces risks and challenges as a result of climate change. The corporation works in high-risk industries that could be impacted by public opinion and laws related to climate change. The fact that 3% of Shell's assets are located in pristine areas, for instance, may cause future disputes and more strict laws. Shell has declared a transition strategy and a target of achieving net zero emissions by 2050 in order to address these threats. By 2024, Shell had exceeded its goal of reducing emissions by 30% over a 14-year period. Its emissions, particularly those from Scope 3, are still greater than some industry standards, nonetheless.

==== Litigation ====
On 5 April 2019, Milieudefensie (Dutch for "environmental defense"), together with six NGOs and more than 17,000 citizens, sued Shell, accusing the company of harming the climate despite knowing about global warming since 1986. In May 2021, the district court of The Hague ruled that Shell must reduce carbon dioxide emissions by 45% by 2030 (compared to 2019 levels).

Shell contested the 2021 ruling, contending that the ruling exceeded judicial authority and could lead to counterproductive outcomes. The outcome was anticipated to significantly impact Shell's operations and influence European energy companies' climate policies. On 12 November 2024, The Hague's appeals court dismissed the 2021 ruling that had required Shell to cut its absolute carbon emissions by 45% by 2030, relative to 2019 levels, including emissions resulting from the use of its products.

=== Oil spills ===
- Shell was responsible for around 21,000 gallons of oil spilled near Tracy, California, in May 2016 due to a pipeline crack.
- Shell was responsible for an 88,200-gallon oil spill in the Gulf of Mexico in May 2016.
- Two ruptures in a Shell Oil Co. pipeline in Altamont, California – one in September 2015 and another in May 2016 – led to questions on whether the Office of the State Fire Marshal, charged with overseeing the pipeline, was doing an adequate job.
- On 29 January 2021, a Dutch court ordered Royal Dutch Shell plc's Nigerian unit to compensate for oil spills in two villages over 13 years ago. Shell Nigeria is liable for damages from pipeline leaks in the villages of Oruma and Goi, the Hague Court of Appeals said in a ruling. Shell said that it should not be liable, as the spills were the result of sabotage.

=== Accusations of greenwashing ===
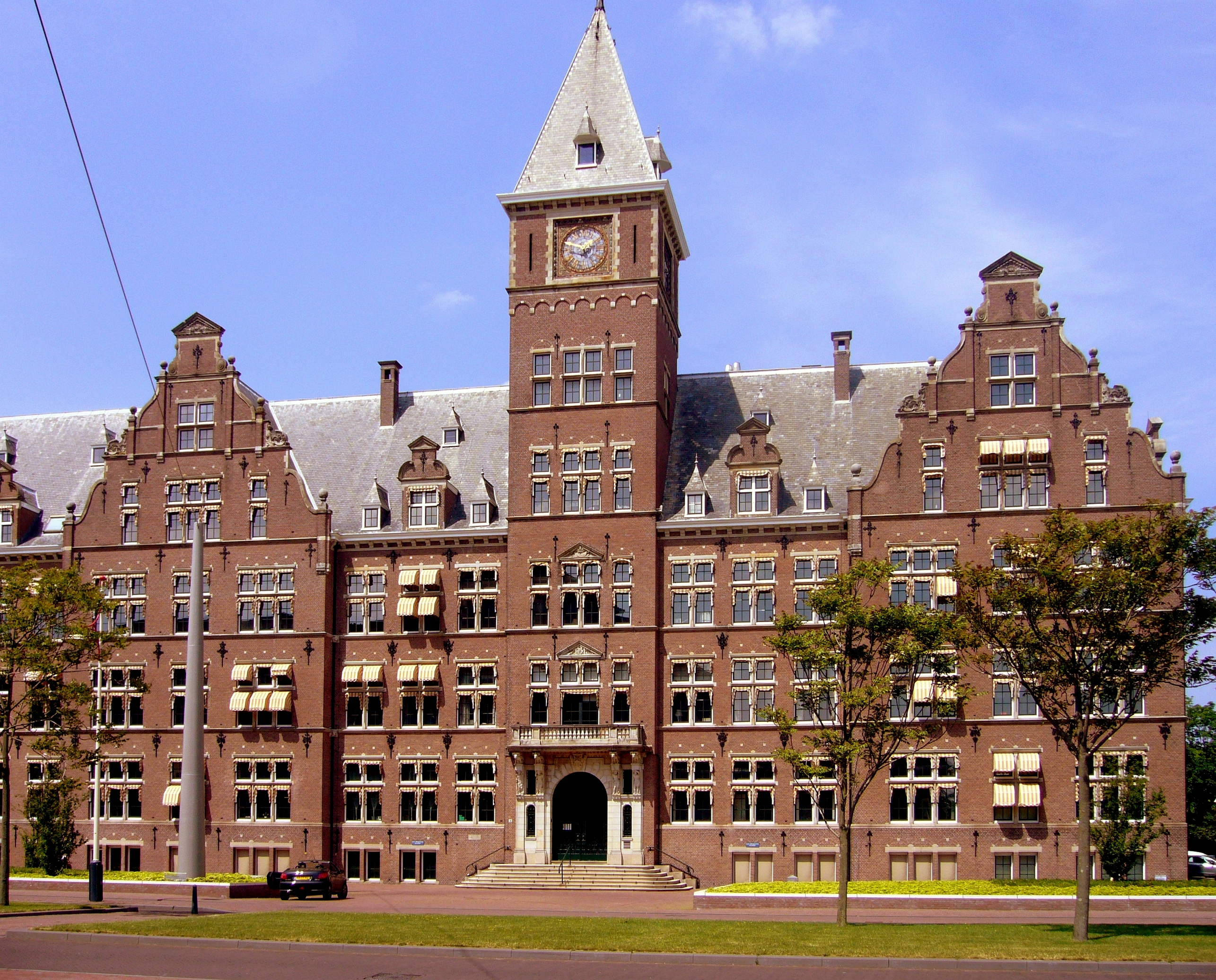
Shell former world headquarters in Haagse Hout, The Hague

On 2 September 2002, Shell chairman Philip Watts accepted the "Greenwash Lifetime Achievement Award" from the Greenwash Academy's Oscar Green, near the World Summit on Sustainable Development.

In 2007, British ASA ruled against a Shell ad involving chimneys spewing flowers, which depicted Shell's waste management policies, claiming it was misleading the public about Shell's environmental impact.

In 2008, the British ASA ruled that Shell had misled the public in an advertisement when it claimed that a $10 billion oil sands project in Alberta, Canada, was a "sustainable energy source".

In 2021, Netherlands officials told Shell to stop running a campaign which claimed customers could turn their fuel "carbon neutral" by buying offsets, as it was concluded that this claim was devoid of evidence.

In December 2022, U.S. House Oversight and Reform Committee Chair Carolyn Maloney and U.S. House Oversight Environment Subcommittee Chair Ro Khanna sent a memorandum to all House Oversight and Reform Committee members summarizing additional findings from the committee's investigation into the fossil fuel industry disinformation campaign to obscure the role of fossil fuels in causing global warming, and that upon reviewing internal company documents, accused Shell along with BP, Chevron Corporation, and ExxonMobil of greenwashing their Paris Agreement carbon neutrality pledges while continuing long-term investment in fossil fuel production and sales, for engaging in a campaign to promote the use of natural gas as a clean energy source and bridge fuel to renewable energy, and of intimidating journalists reporting about the companies' climate actions and of obstructing the committee's investigation, which ExxonMobil, Shell, and the American Petroleum Institute denied.

=== Health and safety ===
A number of incidents over the years led to criticism of Shell's health and safety record, including repeated warnings by the UK Health and Safety Executive about the poor state of the company's North Sea platforms.

== See also ==
- Chaco War
- Fossil fuels lobby
- Lensbury
- List of companies based in London
- Shell Guides, a series of guidebooks
- Shell V-Power
- Shell Service Station (Winston-Salem, North Carolina)
- St1
- Wiwa v. Royal Dutch Shell Co.

== Bibliography ==
=== Commissioned works ===
(In chronological order)

- Smith, P. G. A. (2015) [Originally published in London: Shell Marketing Co., 1919]. The Shell That Hit Germany Hardest. London: Forgotten Books. ISBN 978-1-332-28163-3. Archived from the original on 17 March 2023.
- Shell ... Soldier and Civilian. New York: Shell Union Oil Corporation. 1945. OCLC 1979498. Archived from the original on 17 March 2023.
- Canada Oil. A Century of Progress. Montréal: Shell Oil Company of Canada. 1951. OCLC 150432098. Archived from the original on 17 March 2023.
- The Technical Man in Oil Production. Los Angeles: Shell Oil Company. 1954. OCLC 5731010. Archived from the original on 17 March 2023.
- Beaton, Kendall (1957). Enterprise in Oil, a History of Shell in the United States. New York: Appleton-Century-Crofts. OCLC 236680. Archived from the original on 17 March 2023.
- Dotreville, P.V.B.A. (1958). Belgian Shell Company, 1908–1958. Brussels: Shell Oil Company. OCLC 66950829. Archived from the original on 17 March 2023.
- Renseignements généraux sur la Shell Oil Company of Canada, Limited, 50e anniversaire, 1911–1961 (in French). Toronto: Shell Oil Company of Canada. 1961. OCLC 503096409. Archived from the original on 17 March 2023.
- Forbes, R. J. (1965). A Chronology of Oil: With Special Reference to the Royal Dutch/Shell Group of Companies (2nd, rev. ed.). Den Haag: Bataafse Petroleum Maatschappij (Royal Dutch/Shell Group). OCLC 65917520. Archived from the original on 17 March 2023.
- Wells, Barbara (1979). Shell at Deer Park: The Story of the First Fifty Years. Houston: Shell Oil Company. OCLC 991773301. Archived from the original on 17 March 2023.
- Shell Oil Company: A Story of Achievement. Houston: Shell Oil Company. 1984. OCLC 20438979. Archived from the original on 17 March 2023.
- Shell: 75 Years Serving America. Houston: Shell Oil Company. 1987.
- Schroeder, John G. (1993). Shell at Wood River: 75 Years of Progress. Wood River. IL, USA: Shell Oil Company. OCLC 30772350. Archived from the original on 17 March 2023.
- Montgomery, Bob (2002). Down Many a Road: The Story of Shell in Ireland 1902–2002. Tankardstown: Dreoilín Publications. ISBN 1-902773-11-X. Archived from the original on 17 March 2023.
- Hutchins, H. R. (Holly) (2004). Shell Deer Park: Celebrating 75 Years: People Making a Difference. Deer Park, TX: Shell Deer Park Refining Limited Partnership and Shell Deer Park Chemical Plant. OCLC 780701509. Archived from the original on 17 March 2023.
- Jonker, Joost; van Zanden, Jan Luiten (2007). From Challenger to Joint Industry Leader, 1890–1939: A History of Royal Dutch Shell, volume 1. Oxford: Oxford University Press. ISBN 978-0-19-929878-5. Archived from the original on 17 March 2023.
- Howarth, Stephen; Jonker, Joost (2007). Powering the Hydrocarbon Revolution, 1939–1973: A History of Royal Dutch Shell, volume 2. Oxford: Oxford University Press. ISBN 978-0-19-929879-2. Archived from the original on 17 March 2023.
- Sluyterman, Keetie E. (2007). Keeping Competitive in Turbulent Markets, 1973–2007: A History of Royal Dutch Shell, volume 3. Oxford: Oxford University Press. ISBN 978-0-19-929880-8. Archived from the original on 17 March 2023.
- van Zanden, Jan Luiten (2007). A History of Royal Dutch Shell. Appendices. Figures and explanations, collective bibliography and index. Oxford: Oxford University Press. ISBN 978-0-19-923440-0. Archived from the original on 17 March 2023.
- Manvelov, N. V. (2017). 125 Years of Shell in Russia: 1892–2017. Moscow: Factotums. ISBN 978-5-9908878-4-8. Archived from the original on 17 March 2023.

=== Other works ===
- African National Congress (1980). Fuelling Apartheid. New York: United Nations Centre Against Apartheid, Department of Political and Security Council Affairs. OCLC 77008976. Archived from the original on 17 March 2023.
- A Criminal Enterprise?: Shell's Involvement in Human Rights Violations in Nigeria in the 1990s. London: Amnesty International. 2017. OCLC 1022200039. Archived from the original on 17 March 2023.
- Negligence in the Niger Delta: Decoding Shell and Eni's Poor Record on Oil Spills. London: Amnesty International. 2018. OCLC 1051890064. Archived from the original on 17 March 2023.
- Bailey, Martin (1978). Shell and BP in South Africa (2nd ed.). Birmingham: Haslemere Group/Anti-Apartheid. ISBN 0-905094-02-6. Archived from the original on 17 March 2023.
- Brakel, Aat (1985). People and Organizations Interacting. Chichester, West Sussex, UK: John Wiley & Sons. ISBN 0-471-90476-7. Archived from the original on 17 March 2023.
- Bridges, Harry (1972). The Americanization of Shell: The Beginnings and Early Years of Shell Oil Company in The United States. Newcomen address, 1971. New York: Newcomen Society in North America. OCLC 489377. Archived from the original on 17 March 2023.
- Carroll, Phil (1999). Rebounding, Rebuilding, Renewing at Shell Oil: A Former CEO Reflects on Large-scale Change. Innovations in management series. Waltham, MA, USA: Pegasus Communications. ISBN 1-883823-35-8. Archived from the original on 17 March 2023.
- Cummins, Ian; Beasant, John (2005). Shell Shock: The Secrets and Spin of an Oil Giant. Edinburgh: Mainstream Publishing. ISBN 1-84018-941-X. Archived from the original on 17 March 2023.
- Doran, Peter B. (2016). Breaking Rockefeller: The Incredible Story of the Ambitious Rivals Who Toppled an Oil Empire. New York: Penguin Publishing Group. ISBN 978-0-14-313000-0. Archived from the original on 17 March 2023.
- Frynas, Jedrzej George (1998). Is Political Instability Harmful to Business?: The Case of Shell in Nigeria. University of Leipzig papers on Africa, Politics and economics series, no. 14. Leipzig: Institut für Afrikanistik, Leipzig University. ISBN 3-932632-15-X. Archived from the original on 17 March 2023.
- Fuchs, Tina; Glas, Miroslav (2006). Problem ravnanja vodstva podjetij: primer Shell: diplomsko delo [The Problem of Business Management Behavior: the Shell case] (diploma thesis) (in Slovenian). Ljubljana: Independently published. OCLC 441619660. Archived from the original on 17 March 2023.
- Glässer, Wiebke (2019). Marktmacht und Politik: das internationale Kartell der Ölgesellschaften 1960–1975 [Market Power and Politics: The International Oil Company Cartel 1960–1975] (in German). Berlin; Boston: De Gruyter Oldenbourg. ISBN 978-3-11-063322-1. Archived from the original on 17 March 2023.
- Goedman, Jan (1978). Naar een maatschappelijke planologie en planning: perspectieven voor een ruimtelijke theorie en politiek van de arbeid [Towards a Societal Planning and Planning: Perspectives for a Spatial Theory and Politics of Work] (in Dutch). Amsterdam: Ekologische Uitgeverij. ISBN 90-6224-011-9. Archived from the original on 17 March 2023.
- Hall, John; (with Vaughn, Patrica) (1994). Riding the Winds of Change: The Chronicles of Jack Hall. Chula Vista, CA, USA: ICAN Press. ISBN 1-881116-51-4. Archived from the original on 17 March 2023.
- Hendriks, Frank (1987). Shell: produktie, verwerking en verkoop: energie, metalen, bosbouw en zaaizaad: casestudies Curaçao, Zuid Afrika, Nigeria [Shell: Production, Processing and Sales: Energy, Metals, Forestry and Seeds: case studies Curaçao, South Africa, Nigeria] (in Dutch). Utrecht: Van Arkel. ISBN 90-6224-151-4. Archived from the original on 17 March 2023.
- Hewitt, John (1998). The Shell Poster Book. London: Profile Books. ISBN 1-86197-061-7. Archived from the original on 17 March 2023.
- Howarth, Stephen (1992). Sea Shell: The Story of Shell's British Tanker Fleets 1892–1992. London: Thomas Reed. ISBN 0-947637-32-X. Archived from the original on 17 March 2023.
- Howarth, Stephen (1997). A Century in Oil: The "Shell" Transport and Trading Company, 1897–1997. London: Weidenfeld & Nicolson. ISBN 0-297-82247-0. Archived from the original on 17 March 2023.
- Ibeanu, Okechukwu; Luckham, Robin (2006). Niger-Delta: Political Violence, Governance and Corporate Responsibility in a Petro-state. Abuja: Centre for Democracy and Development (CDD). ISBN 1-902296-30-3. Archived from the original on 17 March 2023.
- Jordan, A. G. (2001). Shell, Greenpeace, and the Brent Spar. Basingstoke, Hants, UK: Palgrave Macmillan. ISBN 0-333-74546-9. Archived from the original on 17 March 2023.
- McCaughan, Michael (2008). The Price of Our Souls: Gas, Shell and Ireland. Dublin: AFRI. OCLC 822888257. Archived from the original on 17 March 2023.
- Merrillees, Scott (2015). Jakarta: Portraits of a Capital 1950–1980. Jakarta: Equinox Publishing. ISBN 978-602-8397-30-8. Archived from the original on 17 March 2023.
- Nieuwenhuis, Frans (1995). Monseigneurs en managers: de Kerk van Rome en de Shell vergeleken [Monseigneurs and Managers: the Church of Rome and the Shell compared] (in Dutch). Rotterdam: Ad. Donker. ISBN 90-6100-403-9. Archived from the original on 17 March 2023.
- O'Donnell, Francis (2011). Corporate Social Responsibility and Shell in Ireland: A Thin Veneer. Newcastle upon Tyne: Cambridge Scholars Publishing. ISBN 978-1-4438-3221-2. Archived from the original on 17 March 2023.
- Ogoni Study Group (Port Harcourt, Nigeria) (1995). Crisis in Ogoniland: The True Story. Ikeja, Lagos, Nigeria: Ogoni Study Group. OCLC 47997162. Archived from the original on 17 March 2023.
- Okonta, Ike; Douglas, Oronto (2003). Where Vultures Feast: Shell, Human Rights, and Oil in the Niger Delta (New ed.). London; New York: Verso. ISBN 1-85984-473-1. Archived from the original on 17 March 2023.
- Omoweh, Daniel A. (2005). Shell Petroleum Development Company, the state and underdevelopment of Nigeria's Niger Delta: a study in environmental degradation. Trenton, NJ: Africa World Press. ISBN 0-86543-984-2. Archived from the original on 17 March 2023.
- Osakwe, Jimor (2002). Justice and the Niger Delta Crises: Historical Analysis in Political and Socio-economic Philosophy. Benin City, Nigeria: Independently published. OCLC 58833598. Archived from the original on 17 March 2023.
- Priest, Tyler (2007). The Offshore Imperative: Shell Oil's Search for Petroleum in Postwar America. College Station, TX: Texas A & M University Press. ISBN 978-1-58544-568-4. Archived from the original on 17 March 2023.
- Reiss, Bob (2012). The Eskimo and The Oil Man: The Battle at the Top of the World for America's Future. New York: Business Plus. ISBN 978-1-4555-2524-9. Archived from the original on 17 March 2023.
- Rowell, Andrew; Goodall, Andrea (1994). Shell-Shocked: The Environmental and Social Costs of Living with Shell in Nigeria. Amsterdam: Greenpeace International. ISBN 1-871532-80-9. Archived from the original on 17 March 2023.
- Sampson, Anthony (1975). The Seven Sisters: The Great Oil Companies And The World They Shaped. New York: Viking Press. ISBN 0-670-63591-X. Archived from the original on 17 March 2023. (Also 4th, revised, edition (1991). The Seven Sisters: The 100-year battle for the world's oil supply. New York: Bantam Books. ISBN 0-553-24237-7.)
- Saro-Wiwa, Ken (1992). Genocide in Nigeria: The Ogoni Tragedy. London: Saros International Publishers. ISBN 1-870716-22-1. Archived from the original on 17 March 2023.
- Schubert, Bianca (2000). Shell in der Krise: zum Verhältnis von Journalismus und PR in Deutschland [Shell in Crisis: On the Relationship between Journalism and PR in Germany] (in German). Münster: LIT Verlag. ISBN 3-8258-5187-7. Archived from the original on 17 March 2023.
- Séguin Dulude, Louise; Desranleau, Claude; Fortier, Yves (1991). La R-D Du Groupe Royal Dutch/Shell Et Shell Canada Limitee: Des Priorites Globales Et Des Initiatives Locales / Royal Dutch/Shell Group and Shell Canada Limited R & D. Special Paper Series, Volume 91, Issue 1 (in English and French). Montréal: École des hautes études commerciales, Centre d'études en administration internationale. ISBN 2-920296-13-2. Archived from the original on 17 March 2023.
- Veron, J. Michael (2007). Shell Game: One Family's Long Battle Against Big Oil. Guilford, CT: Lyons Press. ISBN 978-1-59921-033-9. Archived from the original on 17 March 2023.
- Verweij, Myrthe; Plantenga, Bart (2003). Leaking Pipelines: Shell in South Africa (in English and Dutch). Amsterdam: Milieu defensie. OCLC 870109711. Archived from the original on 17 March 2023.
- Vorfelder, Jochen (1995). Brent Spar oder die Zukunft der Meere: Ein Greenpeace-Report [Brent Spar or the Future of the Seas: A Greenpeace Report] (in German). München: C.H. Beck. ISBN 3-406-39242-3. Archived from the original on 17 March 2023.
- Wesseling, Louis (2000). Fuelling the War: Revealing an Oil Company's Role in Vietnam. London; New York: I. B. Tauris. ISBN 978-1-86064-457-3. Archived from the original on 17 March 2023.
- Wilcox, Fred A. (2019). Shamrocks and Oil Slicks: A People's Uprising Against Shell Oil in County Mayo, Ireland. New York: NYU Press. ISBN 978-1-58367-846-6. Archived from the original on 17 March 2023.
- Williams, Dick (1999). Tankermen: A Seafarer's Recollections of a Life Afloat with "Shell". Bramber, West Sussex, UK: Bernard Durnford Publishing. ISBN 0-9535670-1-X. Archived from the original on 17 March 2023.
- Fuelling Apartheid: Shell and the Military. Geneva: Programme to Combat Racism, World Council of Churches; London: Christian concern for Southern Africa; Utrecht: Werkgroep Kairos. 1984. OCLC 494638741. Archived from the original on 17 March 2023.
- Yergin, Daniel (1991). The Prize: The Epic Quest for Oil, Money, and Power. New York: Simon & Schuster. ISBN 0-671-50248-4.
- ——————— (2011). The Quest: Energy, Security, and the Remaking of the Modern World. New York: Penguin Press. ISBN 978-1-59420-283-4.
- Yeo, Ai Hoon (1988). Enterprise in Oil: The History of Shell in Singapore, 1890-1960 (BA (Hons) thesis). National University of Singapore. OCLC 982168866. Archived from the original on 17 March 2023.
