= KCG =

KCG may refer to:

- KCG Holdings, an American market-making and electronic trading firm
  - Knight Capital Group, predecessor firm to KCG Holdings traded as KCG
- Korea Coast Guard, the coast guard of South Korea
- Kyoto Computer Gakuin, Japan's first private computer educational institution
- Chignik Fisheries Airport, with IATA code KCG
- Kaohsiung City Government, government of Kaohsiung City
- The ISO 693-3 code for the Tyap language
