= Mike Maroone =

American businessman

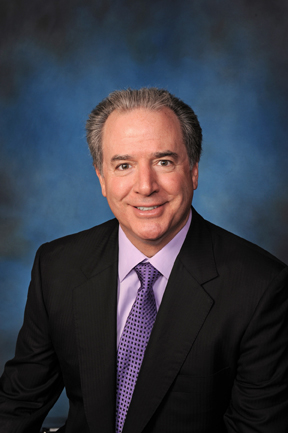

Michael Maroone is an American businessman. He served as president and Chief Operating Officer of AutoNation, Inc. from August 1999 until his retirement in February 2015. He also served as a Director of the company from July 2005.

At AutoNation, Maroone oversaw the development and implementation of the operating structure, common systems and processes in sales, service and e-Commerce. Additionally he had the responsibility for all internal corporate development, real estate, information technology, and industry relations.

Maroone is a second-generation auto dealer, who started out at his family's Ford dealership in upstate New York. In 1977 he became General Manager of the first Maroone dealership in South Florida. The Maroone Automotive Group would grow to nine dealerships before merging with AutoNation in 1997.

He serves as co-chairman of the Cleveland Clinic Florida Leadership Board of the Cleveland Clinic, with his father Alan, where they are leading a $100 million capital campaign to add a neurology and cancer center to the Weston Florida Campus. The cancer center will carry the family name.

Recent recognition includes being honored by Automotive News as an All-Star and as one of the industry's 50 Visionary Dealers of all time. He was recognized as Entrepreneur of the Year by Florida Atlantic University and is a member of the Nova Southeastern University Entrepreneur Hall of Fame. Florida Atlantic University named him "Entrepreneur of the Year", and in 2007 he was inducted into the "Entrepreneur Hall of Fame" at Nova Southeastern University. In 2009 he was named by Automotive News as one of the "fifty industry’s Visionary Dealers". In 2014 Mr. Maroone received Lifetime Achievement Award presented by the Boca Raton Concours D' Elegance.

Maroone is a former minority owner of the Florida Panthers; he and his partners, majority owner Cliff Viner, and minority owners H. Wayne Huizenga, Alan Cohen, and Jordan Zimmerman, sold their interests to Vincent Viola and Douglas Cifu for $250 million in 2013.
