= B. Kevin Turner =

American businessman and investor (born 1965)

Kevin Turner
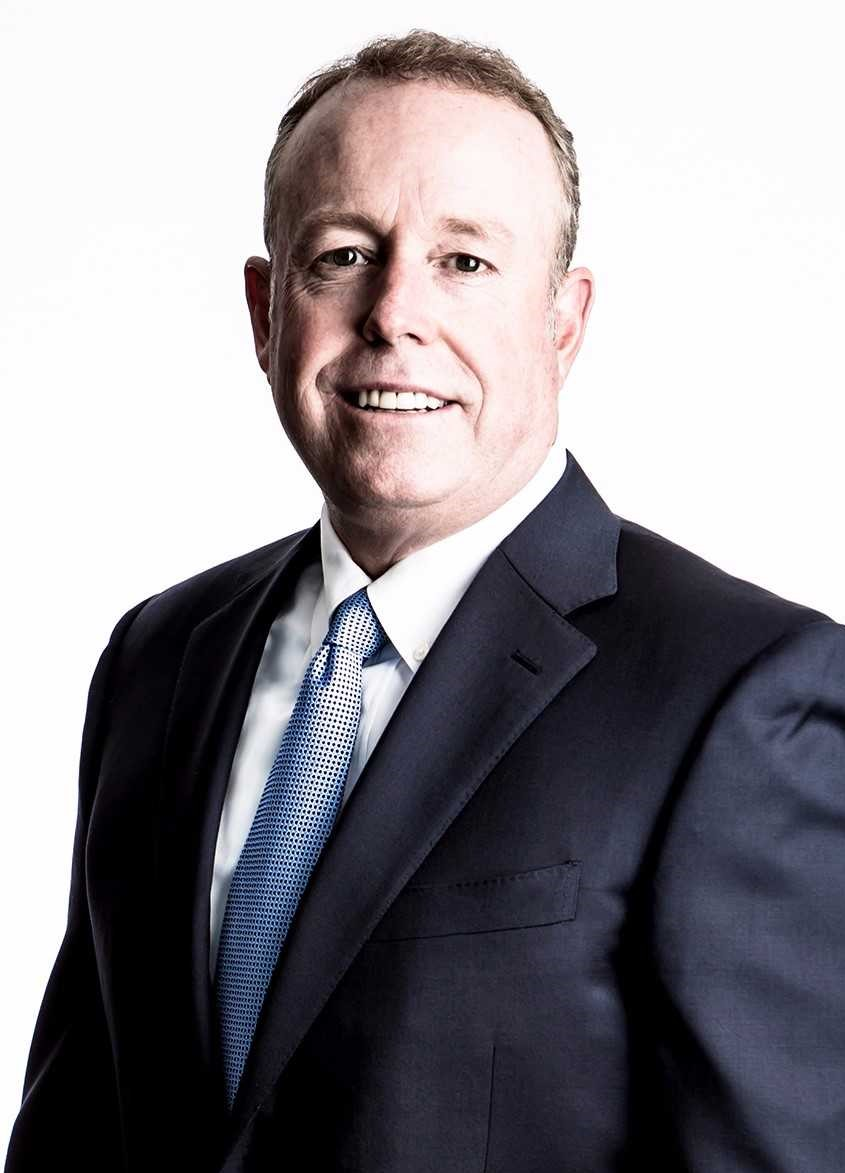
- Turner in 2017
- Born: Brian Kevin Turner; 1965 (age 60–61); Oklahoma, US
- Education: East Central University (BS)
- Occupation: Businessman
- Known for: Former chief operating officer of Microsoft
- Board member of: Albertsons; Zayo Group
- Spouse: Shelley Turner
- Children: 3

B. Kevin Turner (born 1965) is an American businessman and investor who is the chairman of Zayo Group and the vice chairman of Albertsons/Safeway Inc.

During his nearly 20 years at Walmart, Turner rose through the ranks from a store cashier to become the company's global CIO, then CEO of Sam's Club, a $37 billion division of Walmart. Turner was the chief operating officer of Microsoft from 2005 to 2016. From 2016 to 2017, he was the vice chairman of Citadel LLC and CEO of Citadel Securities.

As Microsoft COO, Turner led the company's global sales, marketing, and services organization. He also managed Microsoft's partner channels and corporate support functions, including information technology, licensing, pricing, and operations. His organization included more than 70,000 employees in more than 190 countries. Turner remained through the transitions of Bill Gates, Steve Ballmer, and Satya Nadella.

== Early life and education ==
Turner grew up in Stratford, Oklahoma. In 1987, Turner earned a Bachelor of Science in business administration with a concentration in management from East Central University in Ada, Oklahoma, where he was a member of the Pi Kappa Alpha fraternity. During his college years, he worked full-time as a cashier at Walmart.

== Career ==
=== Early career at Walmart (1985–2000) ===
Turner worked nearly 20 years at Walmart. He began working as a cashier in 1985 in his hometown of Ada, Oklahoma. While attending college, he rose through the store ranks, to customer service manager, housewares department manager and head office cashier. After several promotions, Turner found himself in the auditing department, where he came into contact with Sam Walton. On Walton's advice, Turner joined the company's information systems division, where he worked his way through a succession of jobs: business analyst, strategy manager, director, and then assistant CIO. In 1995, at the age of 29, Turner became Walmart's youngest corporate vice president and officer. In 1997, Turner became the recipient of the first "Sam M. Walton – Entrepreneur of the Year" award, the highest honor given at Walmart, voted on by the Walton Family.

=== CIO of Walmart (2000–2002) ===
In February 2000, 34-year-old Turner became the chief information officer of Walmart, after his boss Randy Mott left for Dell. He oversaw Walmart's information technology and worldwide data-tracking system. The division consisted of over 2,000 employees in Bentonville, Arkansas. He led the team that developed retail-specific applications such as Retail Link at Walmart. During his tenure, Turner was one of the world's largest corporate buyers of technology, and directed the technology strategy of a company renowned for its deft use of computing to streamline everything from global procurement to neighborhood shopping trends.

=== CEO of Sam's Club (2002–2005) ===
In 2002, Turner replaced Tom Grimm as the president and chief executive officer of the Walmart-owned retailer Sam's Club, which had over 46 million members and over US$37.1 billion in annual sales. In addition to his role at Sam's Club, he was also a member of the executive committee at Walmart. Under Turner, Sam's Club focused on lowering prices to win over small-business customers. In his last fiscal year as CEO, Sam's Club turned in 5.8 percent sales growth at stores open at least a year, nearly double the 2.9 percent sales growth at U.S. Walmart stores. As CEO, Turner improved the performance of the warehouse clubs and closed the gap with Costco. Turner was the president and CEO of Sam's Club until he left for Microsoft in 2005. After his departure for Microsoft, Sam's Club named Doug McMillon as its CEO.

=== COO of Microsoft (2005–2016) ===
Turner at the Microsoft Store opening in New York City in 2015

In 2005, Turner was approached by Microsoft co-founder Bill Gates and CEO Steve Ballmer about overseeing the company's worldwide sales, marketing, services, and internal IT operations organization. He had worked with Gates and Ballmer during his time as CIO of Walmart. Turner accepted the offer and moved his wife and three children to Washington state where, in September 2005, he became the chief operating officer of Microsoft (the previous COO, Rick Belluzzo, had left the company in 2002 and no replacement had been hired).

From 2005 to 2016, Turner was responsible for the strategic and operational leadership of Microsoft's worldwide sales, field marketing and services organization. He also managed support and partner channels, Microsoft stores, and corporate support functions including information technology, licensing and pricing, and operations. His organization included over 70,000 employees in more than 190 countries. In 2009, Turner started Microsoft's entry into the retail stores business. Along with Steve Ballmer, Satya Nadella and other senior executives, Turner was on the Senior Leadership Team that set the overall strategy and direction for Microsoft.

As COO, Turner introduced procedures such as a "conditions of satisfaction" document that details what Microsoft will provide each client. A screw-up required a "correction of errors" in which employees autopsied the mistake and laid out steps to ensure it did not happen again. He also created standard scorecards with 30 categories to measure each subsidiary's performance. At Microsoft, Turner was known for his speeches at partner and sales events that amped up the rivalry with competitors like Oracle, Google and IBM. Turner also focused on training talents with initiatives such as ExPo Leaders Building Leaders program, a training and development program that involve multiple methodologies that are customized according to the position of the leader-participant in the organization.

When Steve Ballmer announced he was stepping down as CEO, Turner was one of three internal candidates on the CEO short-list, but ultimately lost the job to Satya Nadella.

In July 2016, after eleven years as COO, Turner left Microsoft to join Citadel LLC. From 2005 to 2016, Turner helped increase Microsoft's yearly revenue from $37 billion to over $93 billion. After his departure, Microsoft CEO Satya Nadella stated that in his time as COO, Turner "built the sales force into the strategic asset it is today with incredible talent, while at the same time more than doubling our revenue and driving customer satisfaction scores to the highest in company history."

After his departure for Citadel LLC, Turner's responsibilities were split across five different Microsoft executives: Jean-Philippe Courtois, Amy Hood, Chris Capossela, Kurt DelBene and Judson Althoff.

=== CEO of Citadel Securities (2016–2017) ===
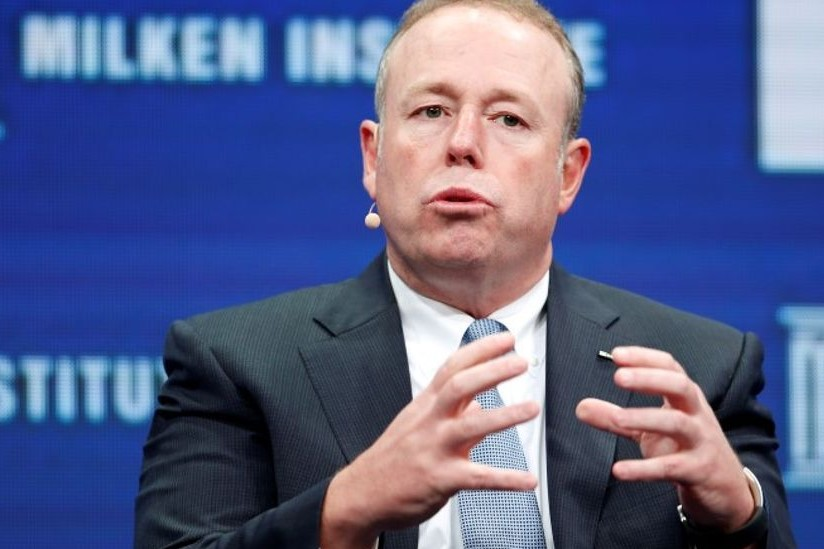
Turner at the 2016 Milken Conference

In July 2016, Turner left Microsoft to become the vice chairman of Citadel LLC and the chief executive officer of Citadel Securities. Citadel Securities is a market maker, providing liquidity and trade execution to retail and institutional clients. Turner's team included Jamil Nazarali, head of Citadel Execution Services, and Paul Hamill, global head of fixed income, currencies and commodities for Citadel Securities. His appointment occurred after Citadel Securities purchased the designated market-maker business of KCG Holdings and the Automated Trading Desk, a computer-based market making pioneer owned by Citigroup. On January 27, 2017, Turner left his position at Citadel Securities.

=== Boards and other roles ===
From 2010 to 2020, Turner served on Nordstrom's board of directors. He was on the technology and finance committees as a part of his board role. In May 2020, Turner decided to not run for reelection on his board seat.

In 2017, Albertsons/Safeway appointed Turner as vice chairman of the board of managers of AB Acquisition, its direct parent company. He was also named as the senior advisor to Albertsons chairman and CEO, Robert G. Miller.

Alongside Brandin Cohen, Hayden Fulstone, Andy Cohen and Lewis Wolff, Turner invested in and served on the board of directors of Liquid I.V., a California-based health-science nutrition and wellness company. The brand sells products for sleep, energy and hydration. In September 2020, Liquid IV was acquired by Unilever, a British-Dutch multinational consumer goods company.

In 2018 Turner was appointed president and CEO of Core Scientific, a blockchain hosting and infrastructure provider headquartered in Bellevue, Washington. It operates crypto mines around the United States. Turner was replaced in May 2021 by co-founder and chairman Mike Levitt. While Turner was CEO, Core Scientific became North America's largest blockchain hosting and infrastructure provider.

In 2020, Turner was named chairman of the board of directors at Zayo Group, which had been acquired by global investment firms EQT AB and Digital Colony for $14.3 billion.

== Awards and honors ==
- Turner was ranked #4 on Fortune magazine's "40 Under 40" in 2003.
- He was among Time magazine's People To Watch In International Business in 2002.
- In 1997, Turner became the recipient of the first "Sam M. Walton – Entrepreneur of the Year" Award, which is the highest honor given at Walmart and is voted on by the Walton family.
- In 2003, East Central University named him a distinguished alumnus.
- CIO magazine awarded Turner the 20/20 Vision Award, CIO 100 Award and was named to the CIO Hall of Fame in 2007.
- CRN magazine listed Turner as one of the Top 25 Most Innovative Executives.
- Business 2.0 named Turner as one of the 20 Young Execs You Need To Know.

== Personal life ==
Turner lives with his wife, Shelley, in Jackson Hole, Wyoming. They have three children.

Business positions
Preceded by Randy Mott	Executive vice president and chief information officer Wal-Mart; 2000–2002	Succeeded by Linda Dillman
Preceded by Tom Grimm	President and chief executive officer Sam's Club; 2002–2005	Succeeded by Doug McMillon
Preceded by Rick Belluzzo	Chief operating officer Microsoft; 2005-2016	Succeeded by None
Preceded by Peng Zhao	Vice chairman of Citadel LLC and chief executive officer Citadel Securities; 2016–2017	Succeeded by Peng Zhao
