= KCGI =

KCGI may refer to:

- The Kyoto College of Graduate Studies for Informatics, an internet technology school in Japan
- KCGI-CA, a defunct television station (channel 45) formerly licensed to Cape Girardeau, Missouri, U.S.
- the ICAO code for Cape Girardeau Regional Airport in Scott County, Missouri, U.S.
