= Douglas Cifu =

American businessman

Doug Cifu
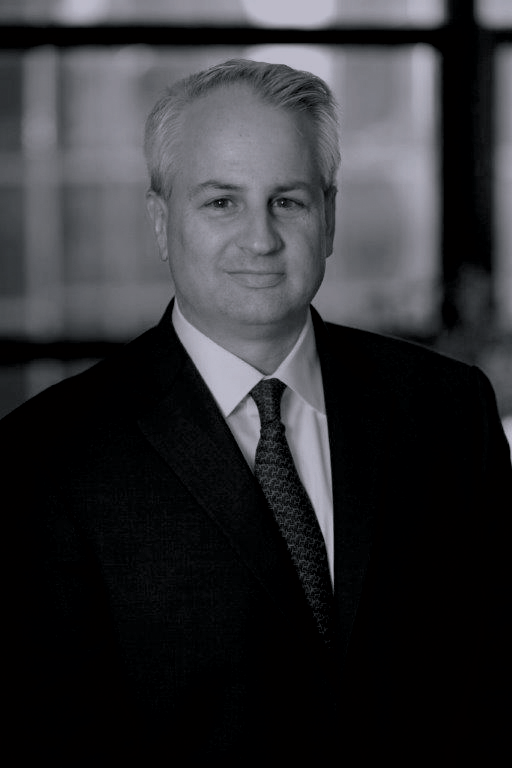
- Cifu posing for a headshot
- Born: Douglas Anthony Cifu; 1966 (age 59–60); Syosset, New York
- Education: Columbia University
- Known for: Co-founder, Virtu Financial; Minority owner, Florida Panthers
- Spouse: Melissa Lautenberg (m. 1999)
- Children: 2

Douglas Anthony Cifu is an American businessman best known as the co-founder of Virtu Financial and as a minority owner of the Florida Panthers.

== Early life and education ==
Cifu was raised in Syosset, New York. As a child, he was a fan of the New York Rangers. His father, John, was an electrical engineer and mother, Rosa, was a nurse. He has two brothers.

As a teenager, Cifu made money by landscaping for his neighbors and by working at a local Carvel ice cream storefront. In high school, Cifu was on the debate team, where he won a championship.

Cifu graduated magna cum laude from Columbia University, majoring in political science. He was elected to Phi Beta Kappa and earned a Juris Doctor degree from Columbia Law School. While in college, he was a commentator for football and baseball games.

== Career ==
In 1990, Cifu joined Paul, Weiss, Rifkind, Wharton & Garrison LLP. He was made a partner in the firm in 1999. In 2005, Cifu met Vincent Viola, who was involved in talks of General Atlantic purchasing a stake in the ownership of the New York Mercantile Exchange. A conversation between the two in 2007 led to Cifu moving on from his position in 2008.

=== Virtu Financial ===
In 2008, Cifu, Viola, and Graham Free co-founded Virtu Financial, a high-frequency trading company.

In 2016, Cifu commented on having traders on the floor of the New York Stock Exchange, calling the practice "a complete vestige of an earlier day".

In 2018, Cifu criticised the Autorité des Marchés Financiers, claiming that the €3 million fine Virtu received in December 2015 for "market manipulation and ignoring Euronext market rules" was based on "not understanding the role of market-makers".

In 2024, Cifu was criticised by Bill Pulte in a Bloomberg article, which stated that Cifu "spends more time tweeting than focusing on his business". The Pulte family's charitable foundation distanced itself from Pulte's comments.

In July 2025, Virtu Financial announced Cifu's retirement, marking the first leadership change since the firm’s founding. He transitioned into an advisory role, relinquishing his position as chief executive officer.

=== Florida Panthers ===
In September 2013, Cifu purchased a minority share in the Florida Panthers, joining majority owner Vincent Viola as part of the Panther's new ownership group succeeding Cliff Viner. Cifu also acts as the team's vice chairman and alternate governor. The pair initially entertained the idea of purchasing a team in 2009. Cifu met with then-Tampa Bay Lightning owner Jeff Vinik, discussing how to rebuild a previously failing franchise.

Cifu and Viola purchased a majority stake in Eastern Airlines in 2014. Beginning in 2015, they used the airline to charter the Panthers team to road games.

In May 2025, Cifu was suspended indefinitely by the NHL following an altercation on X, where Cifu commented on the Israeli–Palestinian conflict and repeated American President Donald Trump's antagonization of Canada, calling the country the "51st state". Specifically, Cifu tweeted "Eat s-- 51st state anti-semite loser," and "Israel now and forever. Until ever last Hamas rat is eliminated." Cifu later apologized, stating the following: "Two days ago, I posted regrettable and inflammatory comments on social media. My behavior does not reflect the standards of the Florida Panthers organization and the Viola family. I sincerely apologize to all those affected by my comments. I am committed to working with the NHL to amend my actions." Since being suspended, Cifu's name was not engraved on the Stanley Cup for the Panthers 2025 title.

=== Board roles ===
In January 2026, Cifu was elected to MarketAxess' board of directors.

== Personal life ==
Cifu resides in South Florida for a portion of the year. He married Melissa Lautenberg in 1999 and together they have two children.

Cifu is a fan of the New York Yankees and the New York Giants.
