= Kevin Turner =

Kevin Turner may refer to:

- B. Kevin Turner (born 1965), American businessman and former COO of Microsoft
- Kevin Turner (running back) (1969–2016), American football running back
- Kevin Turner (linebacker) (born 1958), American football player
