= REDI =

Financial technology firm

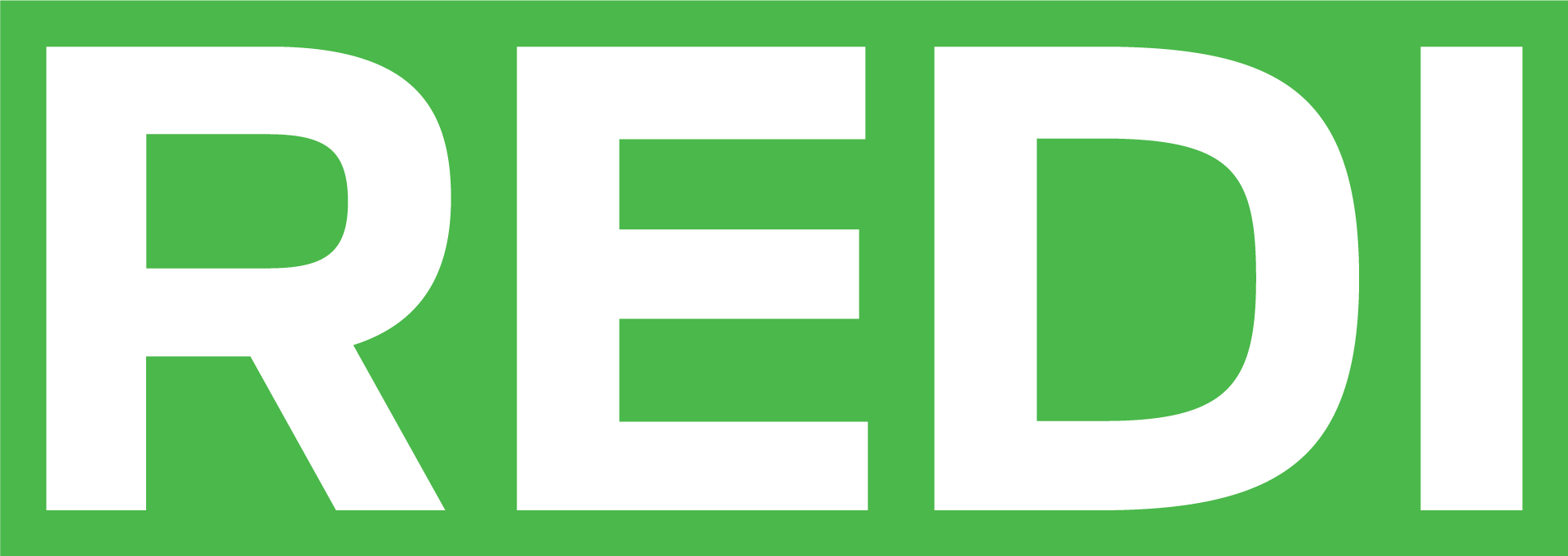
- Industry: Execution management system
- Founded: 1992
- Headquarters: United States
- Parent: Thomson Reuters

REDI is Thomson Reuters' EMS (execution management system) platform. Acquired in 2017, Thomson Reuters REDI allows users to access more than 175 execution brokers to route Equities, Futures or Options orders globally, as well as over 20 prime and clearing brokers. According to the company, there are over 5,000 active users of REDI worldwide.

== Early history ==
REDI was founded in 1992 by market maker and New York Stock Exchange (NYSE) specialist Spear, Leeds & Kellogg. The platform, which stood for “Rapid Execution Dot Interface,” was one of the industry’s first electronic order entry systems.

== Goldman Acquisition ==
REDI became a Goldman Sachs platform in 2000 following the firm’s $6.5B acquisition of SLK. Under Goldman, functionality was steadily added to the platform, including options and futures trading capabilities in 2000, fix-based OMS integration in 2001, portfolio and spread trading capabilities in 2003 and full global connectivity in 2005. By 2013, it was the most widely used EMS by hedge funds and #3 by asset managers, according to the Tabb Group.

== Spinoff ==
In early 2012, Goldman announced its plans to spin off the REDI business as an independent company in order to make it a true multi-broker platform. On July 17, 2013, Goldman announced it had completed the sale of a majority stake in the independent REDI to a consortium of investors including Bank of America Merrill Lynch, Barclays, BNP Paribas, Citadel and Lightyear Capital. The next day, Bank of America Merrill Lynch announced that it would transfer its own proprietary EMS, InstaQuote, to REDI as part of its investment.

== Thomson Reuters Acquisition ==
In early 2017, Thomson Reuters announced the completion of its acquisition of REDI Terms were not disclosed. According to Michael Chin, managing director and global head of trading at Thomson Reuters, the firm plans to integrate REDI into "its pre-trade and post-trade workflow services, and its Eikon financial analysis solution."
