= Kenneth Pasternak =

American financial executive and entrepreneur

Kenneth D. Pasternak
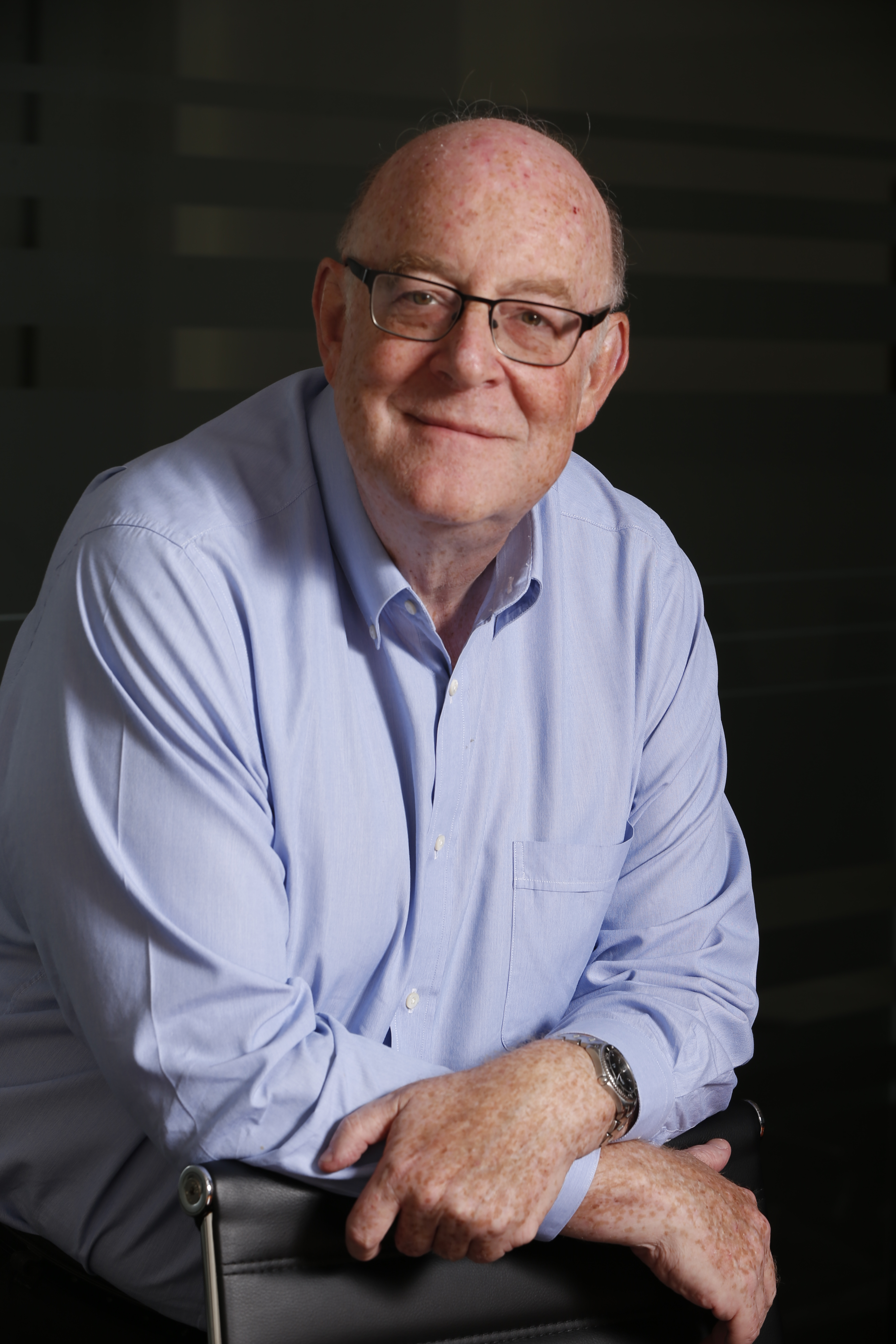
- Born: February 21, 1954 (age 72); Manhattan, New York City
- Education: B.A. State University of New York at New Paltz
- Occupations: businessman, real estate developer
- Known for: co-founder of Knight Trading Group
- Children: Sara Pasternak, Dan Pasternak, Rachel Pasternak

Kenneth D. Pasternak is an American financial executive and entrepreneur. He is a co-founder along with Walter Raquet of Knight Trading Group, and was its chairman and CEO.

== Early life and education ==
Pasternak was born to a Jewish family in Manhattan. His father was born in Austria and fled the Nazis immigrating first to Israel and then the United States in 1951 after a stint in the British Army. His mother was born in Belgium to a Polish Jewish family who was hidden from the Nazis by a Catholic institution for six years; her entire family perished in the Holocaust. His parents met at a resort in the Catskills and settled in nearby Fleischmanns, New York. His father owned a gas station where he also worked as a mechanic and sold used cars.

Pasternak received his high school diploma in 1972 from Margaretville Central School and received a B.S. degree in education from The State University of New York at New Paltz in 1977. He moved to Ridgewood, New Jersey where he renovated a home and then moved to Jersey City, New Jersey which at the time was hotbed of stock trading, an industry that he sought to enter.

== Career ==
Pasternak began his career in 1979 at Spear, Leeds & Kellogg where he started as a librarian. Pasternak eventually worked his way up to senior vice president, limited partner, and trading room manager. He worked at Spear, Leeds & Kellogg until 1994. In 1999, Pasternak, was named "Emerging Entrepreneur Of The Year" by Ernst & Young.

=== Knight Securities ===
In 1994, Pasternak co-founded Knight Trading Group along with Walter Raquet, which benefited exponentially from the advent of internet trading. Knight Trading went public in 1998 with a market capitalization of $7 billion. Pasternak was the company's chief executive officer from its founding in 1995 until he retired in January 2002. Pasternak was on the company's board of directors from 1998 to January 2002. Under his leadership, Knight became the leading wholesale market maker in the United States securities markets. Pasternak and Raquet also took the company public in 1998 under the ticker symbol NITE, and its market capitalization exceeded $5 billion.

In April 2000, Pasternak presented testimony to the US Senate Banking Committee on Competition and Transparency in the Financial Marketplace of the Future. In May 2001, Pasternak presented testimony to the U.S. Senate Committee on Banking, Housing and Urban Affairs regarding the implementation and future of decentralized markets. In 2001, Pasternak was ranked 9th on Forbes' financial services executive pay list, and number 51 overall, with a total compensation package of $26,488,000; this included a base salary of $250,000 and a cash bonus of $26,213,000. Because he owned founders' stock he was compensated primarily in cash, and in terms of cash, he was the highest paid CEO in 2001. Other notable financial services executives on this list included Henry Paulson Jr., the CEO of Goldman Sachs who ranked 70th on the list.

Pasternak was on the board of directors of NASDAQ in 2001 to 2002 and the NASD board of governors in 2001 to 2002, and was an early-stage investor in the International Securities Exchange (ISE) in 1999.

In 2001, Kenneth Pasternak retired as CEO of Knight Trading Group. As described in Edgar Perez’s book, Knightmare on Wall Street: The Rise and Fall of Knight Capital and the Biggest Risk for Financial Markets, Pasternak claimed he didn’t expect to be CEO of a big company. “I was already looking for an opportunity to retire. I always saw myself as a business builder. I had some health issues. I had diabetes and weighed 325 pounds.”

=== Chestnut Ridge Capital ===
After retiring from Knight Trading Group, seeing a credit bubble, Pasternak founded Chestnut Ridge Capital, LLC, a northern New Jersey–based hedge fund, which also is the investing arm of the Pasternak family office.

=== The KABR Group ===
In 2008, seeing that there was opportunity to purchase distressed real estate at a discount, Pasternak founded the real estate investment firm KABR Real Estate Investment Partners LLC. The firm was started with partner Adam Altman where Pasternak is CEO and Chairman. KABR Group is dedicated to the purchase of select real-estate assets in the Metro NYC and Greater Jacksonville areas. KABR I was the first marketed product to come out of Chestnut Ridge Capital LLC, and was succeeded by later funds - KABR II through KABR VI. Ken Pasternak owns a significant portion of both the General Partner ("GP") and Limited Partner ("LP") portions of each of the KABR Funds. The combined Fair Market Value (FMV) of KABR Funds II – VI and other GP managed assets is approximately over $1 billion as of April 2024.

On June 1, 2009, KABR closed a deal to purchase 85 Challenger Road – a 235,000 sq ft (21,800 m^{2}) office building in Ridgefield Park, NJ. The Class-A office building sits adjacent to the NJ Turnpike and was formerly occupied by the Daewoo Corporation. KABR purchased the building from AIG for "...the right price" according to Pasternak – though the purchase price was undisclosed at the time – it was later reported to be approximately $10.5mm.

On October 25, 2020, KABR sold the 85 Challenger Road office building in Ridgefield Park, New Jersey, for a reported $60mm. The Class-A office building was fully leased to Samsung Electronics America – whose tenancy KABR renewed in 2019.

In April 2024, KABR completed the raise for its KABR VI fund at over $100,000,000 from accredited investors.

=== Belleayre Resort ===
Pasternak is a general partner in the development of the Belleayre Resort at Catskill Park, New York, where Crossroads Ventures is developing a $394,000,000 destination resort.

== SEC investigation ==
Pasternak faced a series of investigations brought by the NASD and the Securities and Exchange Commission for supervisory violations stemming from allegations brought by an ex-employee. The NASD fined Pasternak $100,000 for each supervisory violation. However, a federal court ruled that Pasternak was not liable for any violation. On March 5, 2010, Financial Industry Regulatory Authority (FINRA) council reversed a ruling that found two former Knight Securities LP senior executives were responsible for supervisory failures in connection with allegedly fraudulent sales to institutional customers.

== Personal life ==
Pasternak is married with three children and has been a resident of Englewood Cliffs, New Jersey.
