= EDX =

EDX may refer to:

== Science and technology ==
- Electrodiagnostic medicine, a method of medical diagnosis
- Energy-dispersive X-ray spectroscopy, an analytical technique for elemental analysis or chemical characterization
- Event Driven Executive, a software application development system for the IBM Series/1 minicomputer
- EDX register, a data register on the x86 (IA-32) microprocessor architecture

== Other uses ==
- edX, a company that provides massive open online courses
- EDX (DJ) (Maurizio Colella, born 1976), Swiss DJ and producer
- EDX London, a defunct derivatives exchange
- EDX Markets, an institutional cryptocurrency exchange
