= Walleye Capital =

New York Hedge Fund

Walleye Capital LLC
- Type: Private
- Industry: Investment management
- Founded: 2005; 21 years ago
- Founders: Irvin Kessler; Pete Goddard
- Headquarters: New York City, U.S.
- Key people: Will England (CEO & CIO)
- AUM: US$17 billion (September 2026)
- Number of employees: 350 (January 2025)
- Website: walleyecapital.com

Walleye Capital (Walleye) is an American multi-strategy hedge fund management firm headquartered in New York with additional offices outside the US in London and Dubai.

== Background ==
In 2005, Walleye was originally set up as an options market making firm in Minnesota by Irving Kessler, Peter Goddard, and three others. Prior to this Kessler who was an experienced floor trader had founded Deephaven Capital Management.

The founders of Walleye intended for it to perform electronic trading that used data and fast computers to earn profits for its clients. Goddard oversaw the development of a system called Deephaven that enabled Walleye analysts to query large amounts of fast-moving data in real time which gave its clients competitive advantage.

According to Walleye's own disclosures, as a trading firm it has been fined multiple times for breach of regulatory rules.

In 2016, Goddard spun out Deephaven Data Labs as its own company to use the Deephaven system to solve data challenges in other ways.

In 2017, Walleye started accepting outside capital and restructured to become a hedge fund. Walleye changed its strategy with aims to shed its Midwestern image and become the best midsize multi-strategy platform. It limited capital managed so it could put more of its risk into its volatility and quant strategies.

In 2023, Walleye launched Dockside Platforms which connects investors to smaller Money Managers that charge lower fees and offer more liquidity and transparency. This was considered a method to provide more options to investors and chip away at the bargaining power that larger hedge funds such as Citadel LLC, Millennium Management, LLC and Point72 Asset Management held.

In March 2024, Walleye laid off 12 employees (4% of employees) as part of its restructuring process. In August 2024, Walleye laid off a further 12 employees and closed its office in Houston. In October 2024, further cuts were made with 8 traders leaving the firm.

In July 2025, Walleye stated it would no longer be accepting money from new investors.
