= 830 Brickell =

Office high rise in Miami

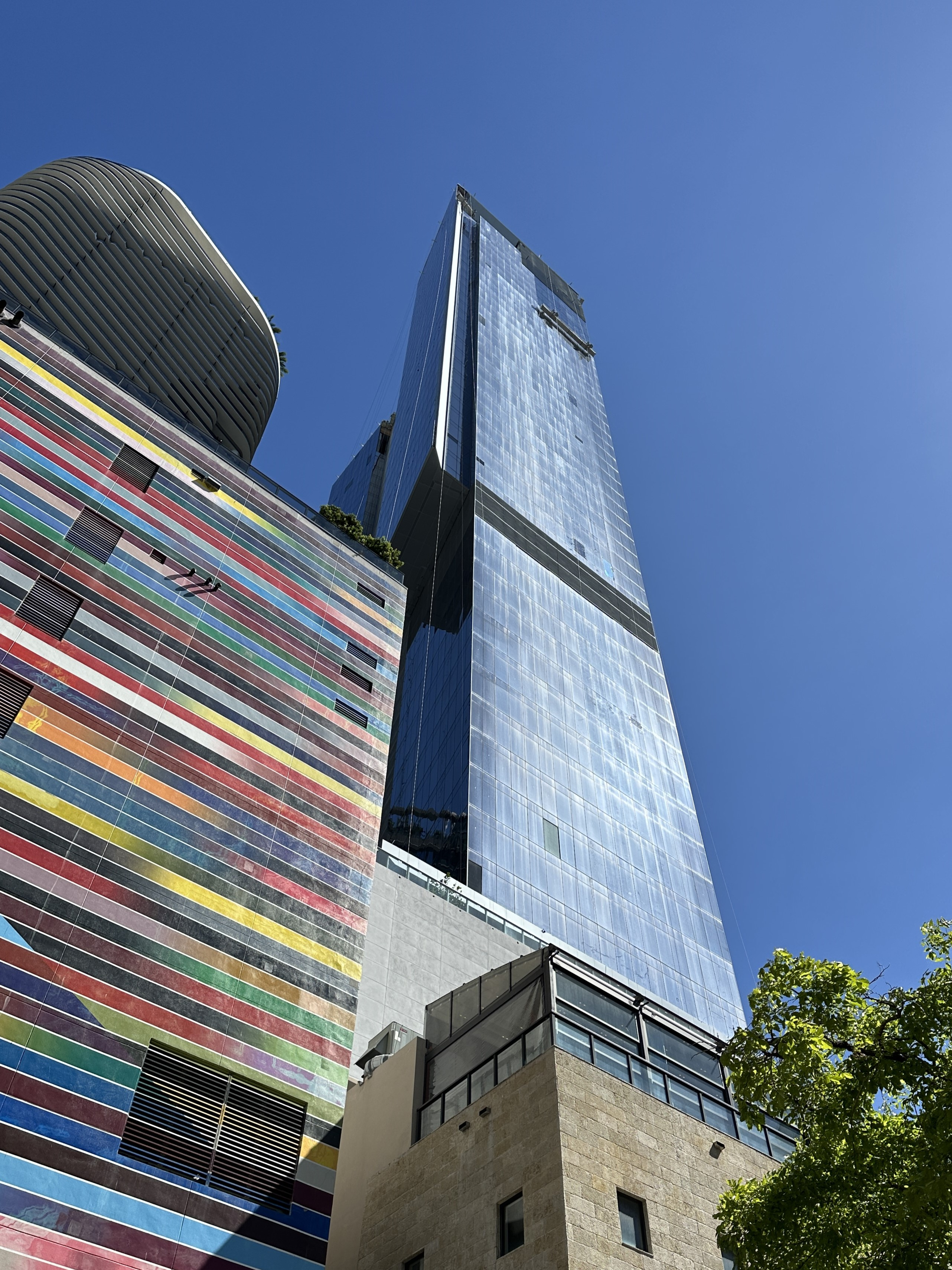
- 830 Brickell in 2024
- Interactive map of the 830 Brickell area

General information
- Status: Completed
- Completed: 2023
- Opened: 2026

Height
- Height: 724 feet (220.7 m)

Technical details
- Floor count: 55

Design and construction
- Architect: Adrian Smith + Gordon Gill
- Developer: OKO Group
- Engineer: DeSimone Consulting Engineers

Website
- 830-brickell.com

830 Brickell is a 55-story office skyscraper in the Brickell neighborhood of Downtown Miami. Topped out in 2023, the building rises 724 feet (220.7 m) making it the sixth tallest building in Miami. The building was designed by Adrian Smith + Gordon Gill architecture of Chicago and is actually located on SE 1st Avenue, one block west of Brickell Avenue. The building was 100% leased during construction with major tenants including Microsoft, Kirkland and Ellis, Rothschild & Co, and Citadel Group, who are later planning to build their own headquarters in Miami.

== Design ==
830 Brickell's structure was designed by DeSimone Consulting Engineers, consisting of several novel solutions to engineering challenges, including; using 14,000 PSI high-strength concrete, an eccentric shear wall core, irregular floor plates with significant cantilevers and multiple transfer levels. The structure was also designed to meet rigorous storm and flood criteria, supporting resilience in a High Velocity Hurricane Zone.

=== Amenities ===
The 30th floor is a Sky lobby complete with a café, lounge and retail, tenant conference rooms, and a state-of-the-art fitness & wellness center with panoramic views. The building’s interior amenities were designed by the Italian architecture and design firm Iosa Ghini Associati, founded by Massimo Iosa Ghini.There will also be an exclusive rooftop club and Mediterranean restaurant.

== Awards ==
The building won Building Feature from the Council on Tall Buildings and Urban Habitat on 22 July 2025.

== See also ==
- List of tallest buildings in Miami
