= Citadel Securities =

American market making firm

Citadel Securities LLC

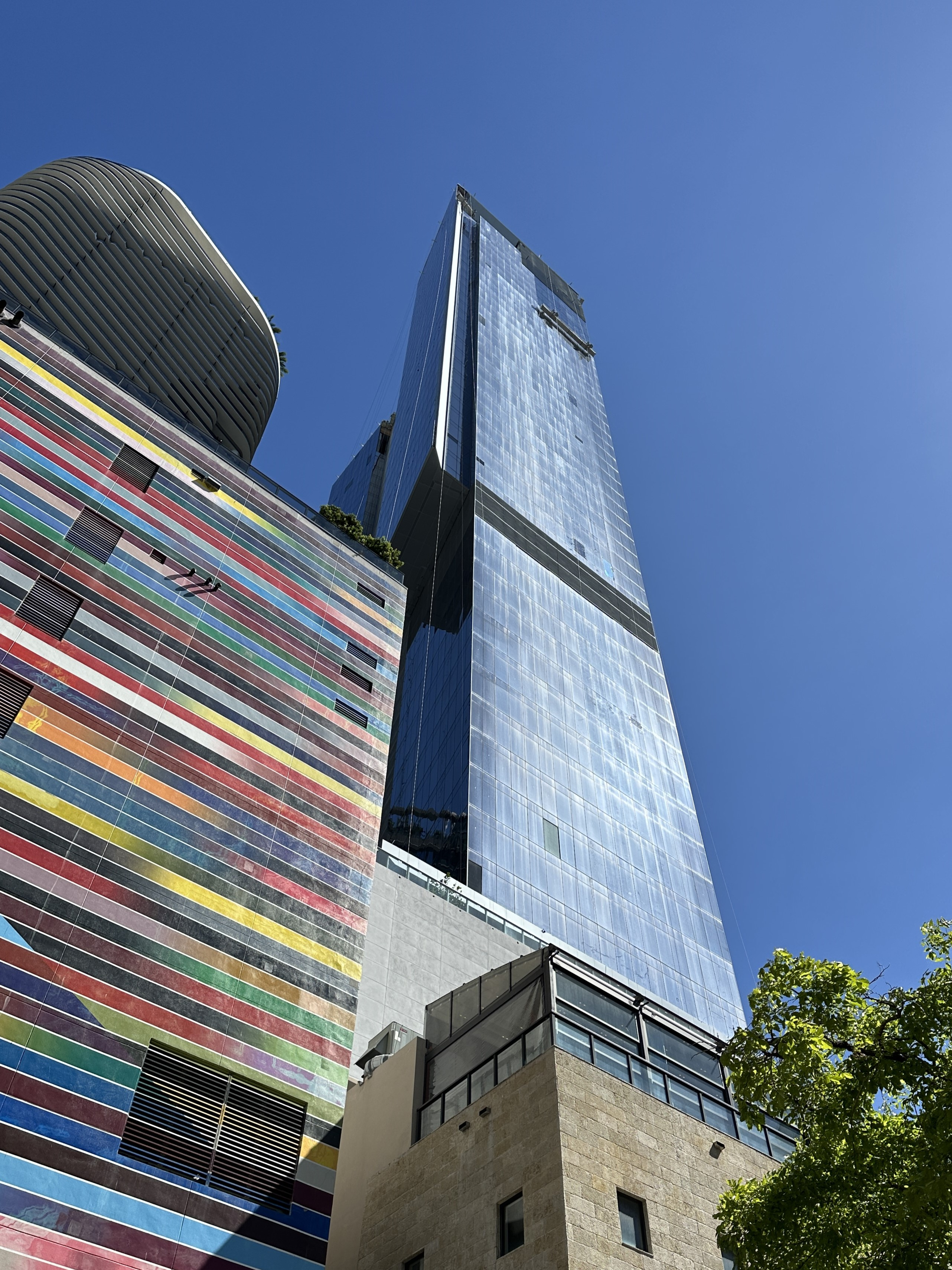
- Company headquarters in Miami, Florida
- Type: Private
- Industry: Financial services
- Founded: 2002; 24 years ago
- Founder: Kenneth C. Griffin
- Headquarters: Southeast Financial Center, Miami, Florida, U.S.
- Area served: Worldwide
- Key people: Peng Zhao (CEO); Kenneth Griffin (chairman); Jim Esposito (president)
- Revenue: ▲US$9.7 billion (2024)
- Net income: ▲US$4.2 billion (2024)
- Number of employees: 1,800 (2025)
- Parent: Citadel Enterprise Americas LLC
- Website: citadelsecurities.com

Citadel Securities LLC is an American market making firm headquartered in Miami, Florida. It is one of the largest market making firms in the United States, along with Virtu and Jane Street, and is involved in one out of every four stock trades in the United States as of 2026. It is also the largest designated market maker on the New York Stock Exchange.

Citadel Securities provides liquidity and trade execution to retail and institutional clients. The firm also trades futures, equities, credit, options, currencies, and Treasury bonds.

Citadel Securities is a separate entity from the hedge fund Citadel LLC, although both were founded and are majority owned by American hedge fund manager Kenneth C. Griffin. Citadel Securities moved its headquarters from Chicago to Miami in 2022. Peng Zhao, who joined the company in 2006, has been the CEO since 2017.

== History ==
=== 2000–2010 ===
Citadel Securities was formed in 2002 as a market maker, providing liquidity and trade execution to retail and institutional clients. By August 2011, the company ended its foray into investment banking to instead focus on electronic trading and market making.

=== 2011–2019 ===
In 2014, the firm expanded its market-making offering to interest rate swaps. The company was also exempted from that year's Regulation Systems Compliance and Integrity (Reg SCI) act, a decision that was criticized by U.S. financial market analysts. Both Citadel and the SEC declined to comment.

In June, 2014, the firm reached a settlement with four regulatory bodies that called for fines totaling $800,000. The agencies asserted that its automated trading programs failed to block erroneous orders. In one case, the release of a test version of a program resulted in a short sale of 2.75 million shares in 11 minutes, causing the company's stock price to plunge. In another case, a mistaken order for 45,000 shares caused a stock price to rise 132%. The cited incidents occurred between 2010 and 2013.

By 2015 Citadel Securities had replaced Wall Street banks as the world's largest interest-rate-swap trader by number of transactions. In 2016, the company opened a new office in Sydney, Australia.

In January 2017, the SEC fined Citadel $22.6 million ($29.7 million in 2025) for misleading clients regarding the way it priced trades. The SEC found that despite Citadel claiming it would provide or try to provide the best prices for retail orders routed by other broker-dealers, two of its algorithms did not internalize retail orders at the best price observed nor sought to obtain the best price in the marketplace. Citadel did not admit or deny these findings. The SEC fined Citadel again in December 2018, this time $3.5 million ($4.49 million in 2025) for incorrectly reporting nearly 80 million trades from 2012 to 2016, and also "willfully violat[ing] the broker-dealer books and records and reporting provisions." Citadel admitted to these findings.

In October 2018, Bloomberg reported that 40% of Robinhood's revenue came from selling customer orders to firms such as Citadel Securities and Two Sigma Securities.

=== 2020–present ===
==== 2020 ====
During the first half of 2020, Citadel Securities doubled its profit while generating $4 billion ($4.98 billion in 2025) in revenue due to increased volatility and retail trading caused by the coronavirus pandemic. In October 2020, Citadel Securities announced it would acquire IMC's NYSE market making unit, making Citadel the largest designated market maker on the NYSE. Citadel Securities also began selling US Treasury and dollar interest rate swap products in Hong Kong in 2020.

Citadel Securities was censured by U.S. regulators 7 times and fined a total of slightly less than 1 million ($1.24 million in 2025) in 2020. This was done in response to a variety of conduct, including failing to close failure to deliver positions, naked short selling, inaccurate reporting of short sale indicators, executing trades during circuit-breaker halts, and failing to offer its clients best prices on the bid-ask spread. The firm also paid a 670 million-yuan ($97 million ($121 million in 2025)) settlement to Chinese regulators for trading irregularities dating from 2015.

In July, 2020, the firm agreed to pay $700,000 in penalties to FINRA for conduct occurring from November 2011 to mid-June 2020. During this time, hundreds of thousands of OTC orders were removed from the firm's automated trading processes, requiring them to be handled manually by human traders. Citadel Securities then "traded for its own account on the same side of the market at prices that would have satisfied the orders," without immediately filling the orders at the same or better prices as required by FINRA rules.

In October 2020, Citadel Securities filed a lawsuit against the Securities and Exchange Commission over its decision to approve a new order type for IEX. The D.C. Court of Appeals ruled on the SEC's behalf two years later.

==== 2021 ====
Between February and May, House of Representatives member Maxine Waters, SEC chairman Gary Gensler, and Senator Elizabeth Warren separately addressed how Citadel Securities' dominant market position could pose a potential future threat to the US financial system. Warren raised further concern regarding Griffin's potential conflicts of interest. Congressional hearings further criticized Citadel's payment-for-order-flow arrangements, and their relationship with Ben Bernanke and Janet Yellen as well as its practice of hiring officials from agencies that regulate it, including the SEC and CFTC.

Separately, in March, Citadel Securities agreed to a censure by FINRA and a $275,000 ($326,738 in 2025) fine for improperly reporting nearly 500,000 Treasury transactions between 2017-2019.

An investors' suit filed later that year claimed Citadel conspired with Robinhood to block trading of certain “meme stocks” during the GameStop short squeeze in January. The meme stocks had been popularized in online discussion forums and according to investors, their rise in price threatened losses to Citadel from its short positions. The suit was dismissed by the District Court in 2022 and the dismissal was upheld by the Eleventh Circuit in 2024. The Circuit Court said that the complaint as filed did not claim that the markets suffered anticompetitive effects from the supposed collusion.

==== 2022–2024 ====
As of January 2022, the firm oversaw more than 2,000 listed securities. In August 2022, the firm opened an office in Tokyo and announced plans to launch US fixed income offerings there. By the end of 2022 Citadel Securities traded in over 35 countries, executed more than 20 percent of all US equity trades and also traded futures, options, currencies and Treasury bonds. The firm ended the year with $7.5 billion ($8.25 billion in 2025) in revenue, which topped the company's previous record set the year prior.

In December 2022, Citadel Enterprise Americas LLC signed a deal with Vornado Realty Trust and Rudin Management Co. to master lease a new $1.2 billion, 1,500 feet (460 m) office tower to be constructed on Park Avenue in Midtown Manhattan to serve as Citadel's new New York City headquarters to solidify access to deep pools of global capital as well as connectivity with Asian clientele.

As of February 2023, the Hong Kong-based subsidiary of Citadel Securities was designated as a Qualified Foreign Institutional Investor (QFII) by the Chinese government, giving the company more access to mainland China's bond and stock markets. In June 2023, Citadel Securities became active in corporate debt trading and introduced investment-grade trading to clients.

In September 2023, the SEC initiated legal action against Citadel Securities, citing violations of Regulation SHO. The SEC found that, between 2015 and 2020, Citadel Securities mismarked millions of sell orders due to a coding error in their automated trading system, obstructing regulatory oversight. The firm agreed to a cease and desist order imposing a censure, a $7 million ($7.4 million in 2025) fine, and additional undertakings without admitting or denying the findings.

In June 2024, Citadel Securities began trading Euro and Sterling interest-rate swaps. The firm grew its existing global rates team to support the expansion and also named Paris as its trading hub for European rates. In September 2024, Citadel Securities hired Jim Esposito, former co-head of global banking and markets at Goldman Sachs, as president.

== Performance ==
In 2012, Citadel Securities was noted for providing reliable trading at lower costs and with tighter spreads. In 2015, Barron's ranked Citadel Securities #1 in providing price improvement for investors in both S&P 500 and non-S&P shares. According to the Wall Street Journal, about one-third of stock orders from individual investors in 2015 was completed through Citadel, which accounts for about 10 percent of the firm's revenue.

== Partnerships ==
In 2009, Citadel Investment Group and the Chicago Mercantile Exchange partnered to create a credit default swaps electronic-trading platform.

In January 2022, Citadel Securities announced that venture capital firm Sequoia Capital and cryptocurrency investor Paradigm Operations had made a $1.15 billion ($1.27 billion in 2025) investment in the firm. The transaction valued Citadel Securities at approximately $22 billion ($24.2 billion in 2025).

Citadel Securities has partnered with other financial firms to launch several exchanges, including the Members Exchange (MEMX), the planned Texas Stock Exchange (TXSE), the crypto exchange EDX Markets (EDXM), and the FMX Futures Exchange.

In 2025, Citadel Securities led a $25 million Series B investment in TransFICC, a provider of fixed-income and derivatives trading technology.

In October 2025, Citadel Securities began partnering with small and mid-sized banks to provide trade processing and pricing for fixed-income securities.

In November 2025, Citadel Securities and Fortress led a $500 million investment in Ripple, valuing the blockchain company at $40 billion. During the same month, Citadel Securities invested $200 million in cryptocurrency exchange Kraken at a $20 billion valuation.
