= Global Electronic Trading Company =

American algorithmic trading firm

Global Electronic Trading Company (GETCO)
- Company type: Subsidiary
- Industry: High-frequency trading, Market making
- Founded: 1999
- Headquarters: Chicago, Illinois, United States
- Key people: Stephen Schuler, Co-founder; Daniel Tierney, Co-founder; Daniel Coleman, CEO
- Number of employees: 400+ (2013)
- Parent: KCG Holdings
- Website: www.getcollc.com

The Global Electronic Trading Company (GETCO), or Getco LLC, was an American proprietary algorithmic trading and electronic market making firm based in Chicago, Illinois. In December 2012, the firm agreed to acquire Knight Capital Group; this merger was completed in July 2013, forming the new company KCG Holdings.

== Description ==
The firm was founded in 1999 by Stephen Schuler and Daniel Tierney, former floor traders in Chicago, and grew quickly in the early 2000s to become one of the most active trading firms in the world. The firm's primary business is electronic market making, though it also provides execution algorithms and a dark pool through its client services arm, GETCO Execution Services.

Prior to the merger into KCG, GETCO traded in over 50 markets in North and South America, Europe and Asia, and was consistently among the top 5 participants by volume on many venues, including the CME, Eurex, NYSE Arca, NYSE Arca Options, BATS, Nasdaq, Nasdaq Options, Chi-X, BrokerTec, and eSpeed. It had offices in New York City, Chicago, London, and Singapore, and was an investor in the electronic exchanges BATS Exchange, Chi-X, NYSE Liffe U.S., Eris, and ELX.

In a 2009 profile by the Wall Street Journal, the firm was identified as one of the largest market makers in the US stock market. GETCO also served as one of the six Designated Market Makers (DMMs) on the NYSE between 2010 and the merger. In 2012, Scott Patterson described the firm as "the largest and most powerful high-frequency trading firm".

GETCO was one of the six investors that participated in the rescue of Knight Capital, a competitor that had experienced a significant trading malfunction on August 1, 2012 which resulted in a $460 million loss. Supported by its main investor, General Atlantic, GETCO pursued Knight Capital and defeated a competing proposal from Virtu Financial by offering to pay $3.75 per share to Knight Capital’s shareholders, for a total value of $1.4 billion.
