= Cliff Viner =

American businessman (born 1948)

Clifford G. Viner
- Born: 1948 (age 77–78); Brooklyn, New York
- Education: B.S. University of Pennsylvania; M.B.A. The Wharton School of the University of Pennsylvania
- Occupation: hedge fund founder
- Known for: past owner of the Florida Panthers
- Spouse(s): Jill Laurie Silver (divorced); Eda Viner
- Children: 4

Clifford G. Viner (born 1948) is an American businessman who founded the III Finance hedge fund and was previously a co-owner of the Florida Panthers from 2008 to 2013.

== Biography ==
Born in Brooklyn, New York, Viner is of Jewish descent. He graduated magna cum laude with a B.S. from the University of Pennsylvania and an M.B.A. from The Wharton School of the University of Pennsylvania. After school, he worked as an analyst at Phoenix Mutual Life Insurance and then as a government securities trader at William Blair & Company in Chicago. In 1982, he co-founded III Offshore Partners, a hedge fund based in Boca Raton, Florida with Warren Mosler.

In 2001, Viner was part of a group of investors led by Alan Cohen that bought a majority interest in the Panthers from Wayne Huizenga (who kept a minority interest). In November 2009, he became co-general partner with Cohen. In 2010, Viner gained control as general partner of the Florida Panthers with minority partners including Stu Siegel, Alan Cohen, and Huizenga. In late 2013, they sold the franchise for $250 million to Vincent Viola.

Viner is a Registered General Securities Principal, General Securities Options Principal, and General Securities Representative of FINRA, a CFTC-Approved Principal, and an Associate Member of the NFA. Viner is heavily involved with the Florida Panthers Foundation which focuses on pediatric oncology causes.

== Personal life ==
Viner has married twice. His first wife was Jill Laurie Silver, who co-founded the Barton G. Kids Hear Now Foundation with Barton G. Weiss. they had two children before divorcing.

In 2010, Cliff Viner married Eda Viner. He has two children from his first marriage and two stepchildren.

== Philanthropy ==
He and his wife founded the Eda and Cliff Viner Community Scholars Foundation in 2015. The Eda and Cliff Viner Community Scholars Foundation has been providing four year scholarships to public Florida Universities and Colleges to academically deserving High School students in Boca Raton and Delray who have financial needs and are community service driven. Eda sits on the board of Florence Fuller Child Development Centers and together they chaired the 2015 and 2016 Wee Dream Ball and raised over 1 Million dollars in Boca Raton, Florida. Cliff Viner sits on the board of the Urban League of the Palm Beaches and is currently the Founder and first President of the Urban League Foundation. Viner is past president and current member of B'nai Torah Congregation in Boca Raton, Florida.
