= Peng Zhao =

Chinese-American financial services businessman

- 赵鹏
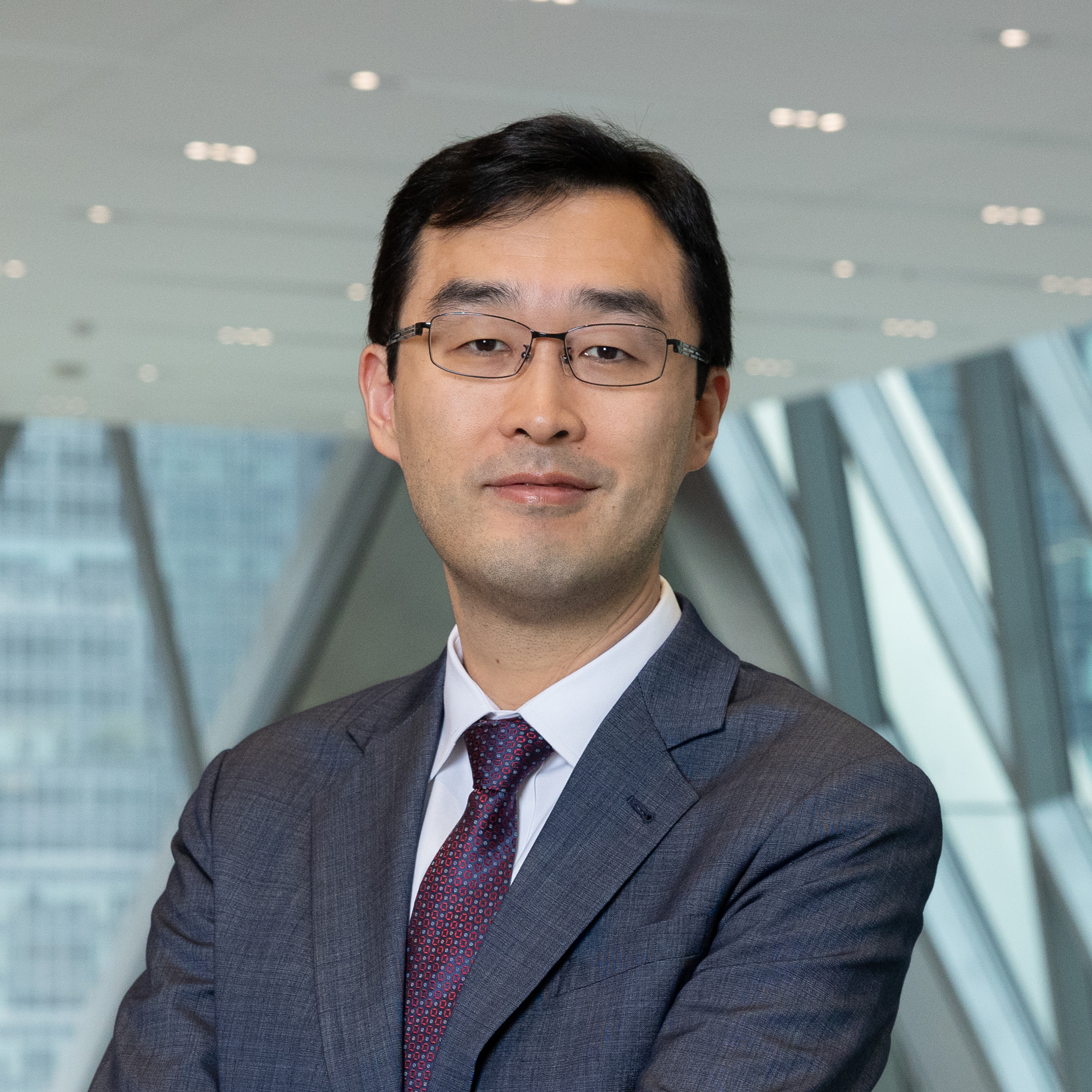
- Peng Zhao, April 2024
- Born: 1982 or 1983 (age 43–44); Beijing, China
- Education: Peking University (BA); University of California, Berkeley (MA, PhD)
- Occupation: Businessman
- Years active: 2006-present
- Employer: Citadel Securities
- Title: CEO (2017-present)
- Board member of: The Asian American Foundation; National Committee on United States–China Relations

Peng Zhao (Chinese: 赵鹏; pinyin: Zhào Péng, born 1982 or 1983) is a Chinese-American businessman who is the CEO of Citadel Securities. Peng Zhao was born in Beijing, China.

== Education ==
Zhao earned a bachelor's degree in applied mathematics from Peking University in 2001 and a PhD in statistics from the University of California, Berkeley, in 2006.

== Career ==
Peng Zhao joined Citadel Securities in 2006 as a quantitative researcher.

In July 2016, Citadel Securities announced that then Microsoft COO, B. Kevin Turner, was joining the firm as CEO. At this time a new role, chief scientist, was created specifically for Peng Zhao who was then the global head of market making. Five months after joining, Kevin Turner left Citadel Securities, and on 27 January 2017, at age 34, Peng Zhao was promoted to CEO.

== Board memberships ==
Zhao is a director of the nonprofit organization National Committee on United States–China Relations. He is a founding board member of the non-profit advocacy and anti-discrimination group The Asian American Foundation (TAAF), established in 2021.

=== Accolades ===
In 2019, Zhao was named on Fortune 40 Under 40 list.

== Philanthropy ==
Zhao and his wife organized a one million surgical mask donation to Chicago's first responders during the coronavirus pandemic in 2020. The couple also supports Kartemquin Films, a non-profit documentary filmmaking organization, in its efforts to fund filmmakers from the AAPI community through the Zhao-Chen AAPI Voices Fund. They were co-executive producers of the award-winning documentary Finding Yingying, which was released by Kartemquin Films. The couple also funds the Victor Wong Fellowship, a program associated with Chicago's Second City, to train and mentor aspiring comedians from the AAPI community. Peng and other founding board members of TAAF committed $125 million to support AAPI organizations and causes at launch. According to The New York Times, it was the single largest philanthropic gift devoted to Asian Americans. In 2024, Zhao was a lead donor to the San Diego Zoo Wildlife Alliance’s “Panda Ridge” habitat renovation, completed to support the arrival of the first giant pandas in the United States in 21 years.

== See also ==
- Chinese Americans
