= Barton G. Weiss =

- Born: May 15, 1956 (age 70); Philadelphia, Pennsylvania, U.S.
- Occupations: Entrepreneur, restaurateur, event planner, author
- Children: Tyler & Jadin
- Parent(s): Norman and Eleanor Weiss
- Website: bartong.com

Barton G. Weiss (born May 15, 1956) is a Miami-based event designer, producer, restaurateur, author, entrepreneur, and philanthropist.

== Early life ==
Weiss was born in Philadelphia, on May 15, 1956, the son of Norman and Eleanor Weiss.

== Career ==
Weiss lived in New York before moving to Miami and founding his eponymous event production business in 1993. Weiss is a former professional ice skater. After his athletic career ended, he moved into costume and set design. His previous clients included Chita Rivera and Cher. In 1993, Weiss moved to Miami to help a friend produce a charity gala, which led him to form his own events production company. His restaurants are recognized as a "Willy Wonka-style" dining experience.

=== Barton G. ===
Barton G. provides events management and production, weddings, off-site catering, destination management, and restaurants. In addition to private clients, the company has created more than 20,000 events for celebrities, Fortune 500 companies, and sports associations, including BMW, Giorgio Armani, NBC, Microsoft, Neiman Marcus, Cartier, the NFL, and PGA.

=== Barton G. The Restaurant - Miami ===
He opened Barton G. The Restaurant (previous Kerry Simon's Starfish) in 2002. It's known for its theatrical, over-the-top presentations. The restaurant has been described as “the Cirque de Soleil meets Ultra Music Festival meets the Indy 500 of the dining world - with the quality and flavors of a Michelin-Starred restaurant.” In 2017, the restaurant was included in OpenTable's list of the country's top 100 "hot spots."

=== Barton G. The Restaurant - Los Angeles ===
Following the success of the Miami location, Weiss opened the second location of Barton G. The Restaurant in Los Angeles in June 2014.

=== Barton G. The Restaurant - Chicago ===
A third Barton G. restaurant opened in Chicago, in February 2019, inside the former Sullivan's Steakhouse on N. Dearborn. It closed in 2020 due to the COVID-19 pandemic.

=== Other Ventures ===
In 2009, Weiss opened Prelude by Barton G. located inside the Adrienne Arsht Center for the Performing Arts in Miami. In 2010, he took over operations of the Casa Casuarina Versace Mansion to open The Villa by Barton G., a boutique hotel and restaurant destination.

== Media ==
Weiss has appeared as a guest judge, and guest blogger for Bravo's Top Chef. He was an inaugural member of Town and Country magazine's Wedding Advisory Board.

== Philanthropy ==
Weiss co-founded the Barton G. Weiss Kids Hear Now Foundation with Jill Viner (former wife of Cliff Viner) in 2009 when he learned his daughter was born deaf and would require cochlear implants. Partnering with the University of Miami Miller School of Medicine for the past 20 years, the Cochlear Implant Program has helped restore hearing to more than 1,000 deaf children and adults. The Barton G. Kids Hear Now Cochlear Implant Family Resource Center, which opened in 2010 and is housed at the UHealth Ear Institute, emphasizes the viability of cochlear implants and auditory verbal therapy as an option for deaf children to become part of the hearing world.

== Personal life ==
Weiss is divorced from Bobby Alpert; they have two children.

== Books ==
- The Big Dish: Recipes to Dazzle and Amaze from America's Most Spectacular Restaurant, ISBN 9780789327208
