= Merrill Lynch, Pierce, Fenner & Smith Inc. v. Manning =

- Supreme Court of the United States

Argued December 1, 2015 Decided May 16, 2016
- Full case name: Merrill Lynch, Pierce, Fenner & Smith Inc., et al., Petitioners v. Greg Manning, et al.
- Docket no.: 14-1132
- Citations: 578 U.S. 374 (more) 136 S. Ct. 1562; 194 L. Ed. 2d 671
- Opinion announcement: Opinion announcement

Case history
- Prior: Motion to remand denied, Manning v. Merrill Lynch, Pierce, Fenner & Smith, Inc., No. 12-cv-04466-JLL, 2013 WL 1164838 (D.N.J. Mar. 20, 2013); reversed and remanded, 772 F.3d 158 (3d Cir. 2014); cert. granted, 135 S. Ct. 2938 (2015).

Holding
- Section 27 of the Securities Exchange Act of 1934 allows state courts to handle claims filed under their own investor-protection laws even if the litigation might involve some issues under federal securities law.

Court membership
- Chief Justice John Roberts Associate Justices Anthony Kennedy · Clarence Thomas; Ruth Bader Ginsburg · Stephen Breyer; Samuel Alito · Sonia Sotomayor; Elena Kagan

Case opinions
- Majority: Kagan, joined by Roberts, Kennedy, Ginsburg, Breyer, Alito
- Concurrence: Thomas, joined by Sotomayor

Laws applied
- The case invokes the general federal question statute, 28 U. S. C. §1331, which grants district courts jurisdiction of “all civil actions arising under” federal law. It also invoked §27 the Securities Exchange Act of 1934.

Merrill Lynch, Pierce, Fenner & Smith Inc. v. Manning, 578 U.S. ___ (2016), was a United States Supreme Court case in which the Court held, 8–0, that the jurisdictional test established by §27 of the Securities Exchange Act of 1934 is the same as 28 U.S.C. § 1331's test for deciding if a case "arises under" a federal law.

== Background ==
Greg Manning sued Merrill Lynch, which is the wealth management division of Bank of America, and other stock brokerage houses, for allegedly naked short selling the common stock of a public company of which Manning owned two million shares. Manning and other former shareholders of the public company filed suit in New Jersey state court, alleging that Merrill Lynch's actions violated New Jersey law. Merrill Lynch made a motion to have the case moved to federal court, where Merrill Lynch and the other petitioners believed they would receive better treatment than in state court.

In an opinion authored by D. Brooks Smith, the Third Circuit held that no federal jurisdiction existed, and directed that the case be remanded to state court. The Third Circuit's decision deepened a circuit split among the Second Circuit, Fifth Circuit and Ninth Circuit over the scope of § 27 of the Securities Exchange Act of 1934.

=== Defendants ===
Manning and the other shareholders sued several financial services firms, which included Merrill Lynch, Knight Capital Americas, UBS Securities, E-Trade Capital Markets National Financial Services LLC, and Citadel Derivatives Group.

=== Regulation SHO ===
Manning and the shareholders sued under New Jersey state law, claiming that the naked short sales constituted illegal market manipulation, causing the value of their shares to decline. Manning and the shareholders alleged that Merrill Lynch and the other financial institutions consistently violated Regulation SHO, the federal law that regulates naked short selling of common stock. The Securities & Exchange Commission regulates short sales at the federal level: Regulation SHO, issued under the Exchange Act, prohibits short sellers from intentionally failing to deliver securities and thereby curbs market manipulation. However, Manning and the shareholders did not make a claim under federal law (i.e. the Exchange Act) and they did not file in federal court. They only referred to allegations of federal violations of Regulation SHO. They made only a state law claim of illegal market manipulation in a New Jersey state court.

=== State law claims ===
Manning charged Merrill Lynch and the other financial institutions with violations of the New Jersey Racketeer Influenced and Corrupt Organizations Act, New Jersey Criminal Code, and New Jersey Uniform Securities Law. Manning's complaint also charged violations of the New Jersey common law of negligence, unjust enrichment, and interference with contractual relations.

== Opinion of the Court ==
The court ruled unanimously that the case could be decided in state court even though there was an invocation of federal law, specifically the Securities Exchange Act of 1934 and Regulation SHO. Justice Elena Kagan wrote the majority decision where she engaged in a statutory interpretation of the 1934 Securities Act and held that Section 27 of the Act allows the state court to hold jurisdiction over the case. The court's majority decision did not rule on the merits of the Manning or the shareholders' case, only on jurisdictional issues.

Kagan wrote that Section 27 confers exclusive federal jurisdiction under the Exchange Act in the same manner that "aris[e] under" confers exclusive federal jurisdiction pursuant to 28 U.S.C. § 1331 (the federal question jurisdiction statute). Kagan also wrote that Manning's claims all arose under state law and did not necessarily raise any federal issues, affirming the decision of the Third Circuit court (772 F. 3d 158).

Justice Clarence Thomas wrote a concurring opinion, stating that Section 27 establishes a straightforward textual test. Since the complaint did not allege any such claims in that test, he agreed that the case should be decided in state court. Thomas wrote that Section 27 of the Securities Exchange Act of 1934 "establishes a straightforward test: If a complaint alleges a claim that necessarily depends on a breach of a requirement created by the Act, §27 confers exclusive federal jurisdiction over that suit. Because the complaint here does not allege such claims—and because no other statute confers federal jurisdiction—this suit should return to state court."

== See also ==
- Commodity Futures Trading Commission
- Financial regulation
- Securities Commission
- Securities regulation in the United States
- Stock exchange
