= Federal jurisdiction (United States) =

Legal scope of the powers of the U.S. federal government

Federal jurisdiction refers to the legal scope of the government's powers in the United States of America.

The United States is a federal republic, governed by the U.S. Constitution, containing fifty states and a federal district which elect the President and Vice President, and having other territories and possessions in its national jurisdiction. This government is variously known as the Union, the United States, or the federal government.

Under the Constitution and various treaties, the legal jurisdiction of the United States includes territories and territorial waters.

== Legislative Branch ==
One aspect of federal jurisdiction is the extent of legislative power. Under the Constitution, Congress has power to legislate in only the areas that are delegated to it. Under clause 17 Article I Section 8 of the Constitution however, Congress has power to "exercise exclusive Legislation in all cases whatsoever" over the federal district (Washington, D.C.) and other territory ceded to the federal government by the states, such as for military installations.

Federal jurisdiction in this sense is important in criminal law because federal law does not supersede state criminal law. Congress has enacted the Assimilative Crimes Act (18 U.S.C. § 13), which provides that any act that would have been a crime under the laws of the state in which a federal enclave is situated is also a federal crime. As most such enclaves are occupied by the military, military law is especially concerned with these enclaves, especially the issue of establishing who has jurisdiction and what type of jurisdiction. In such areas, the federal government may have proprietary jurisdiction (rights as landowner), concurrent jurisdiction (with federal and state law applicable), or exclusive jurisdiction over the land where an act was committed. Courts-martial involving military members subject to the Uniform Code of Military Justice apply regardless of location.

Article Four of the United States Constitution also states that the Congress has the power to enact laws respecting the Territory or other Property belonging to the United States. Federal jurisdiction exists over any territory thus subject to laws enacted by the Congress.

== Judicial branch ==
U.S. Court of Appeals and District Court jurisdictions

The American legal system includes both state courts and federal courts. State courts hear cases involving state law, and such federal laws as are not restricted to hearing in federal courts. Federal courts may hear only those cases where federal jurisdiction can be established. Specifically, the court must have both subject-matter jurisdiction over the matter of the claim and personal jurisdiction over the parties.

The Federal Courts are courts of limited jurisdiction, meaning that they exercise only those powers granted to them by the Constitution and Federal Laws. There are several forms of subject-matter jurisdiction, but the two most commonly appealed to are federal-question jurisdiction and diversity jurisdiction. Federal question jurisdiction is available when the plaintiff raises a claim that arises under the laws, treaties, or Constitution of the United States, as opposed to claims arising under state law. By the "Well-Pleaded Complaint" rule, federal question jurisdiction is not available if the federal issue arises as only a defense to a state-law claim. Diversity jurisdiction, on the other hand, is available regarding state-law claims if every plaintiff is from a different state from every defendant (the requirement for so-called complete or total diversity) and the amount in controversy exceeds $75,000.

If a Federal Court has subject matter jurisdiction over one or more of the claims in a case, it has discretion to exercise ancillary jurisdiction over other state law claims.

The Supreme Court has "cautioned that ... Court[s] must take great care to 'resist the temptation' to express preferences about [certain types of cases] in the form of jurisdictional rules. Judges must strain to remove the influence of the merits from their jurisdictional rules. The law of jurisdiction must remain apart from the world upon which it operates".

Generally, when a case has successfully overcome the hurdles of standing, Case or Controversy and State Action, it will be heard by a trial court. The non-governmental party may raise claims or defenses relating to alleged constitutional violation(s) by the government. If the non-governmental party loses, the constitutional issue may form part of the appeal. Eventually, a petition for certiorari may be sent to the Supreme Court. If the Supreme Court grants certiorari and accepts the case, it will receive written briefs from each side (and any amici curiae or friends of the court—usually interested third parties with some expertise to bear on the subject) and schedule oral arguments. The Justices will closely question both parties. When the Court renders its decision, it will generally do so in a single majority opinion and one or more dissenting opinions. Each opinion sets forth the facts, prior decisions, and legal reasoning behind the position taken. The majority opinion constitutes binding precedent on all lower courts; when faced with very similar facts, they are bound to apply the same reasoning or face reversal of their decision by a higher court.

== See also ==
- Jurisdiction
- Law of the United States
- Federalism
- Territorial Clause - U.S. Const. art. IV, § 3, cl. 2
- Merrill Lynch, Pierce, Fenner & Smith Inc. v. Manning, a 2016 Supreme Court case that ruled on federal jurisdiction issues in securities law cases.
