= Virtu Financial =

American market making firm

Virtu Financial, Inc.

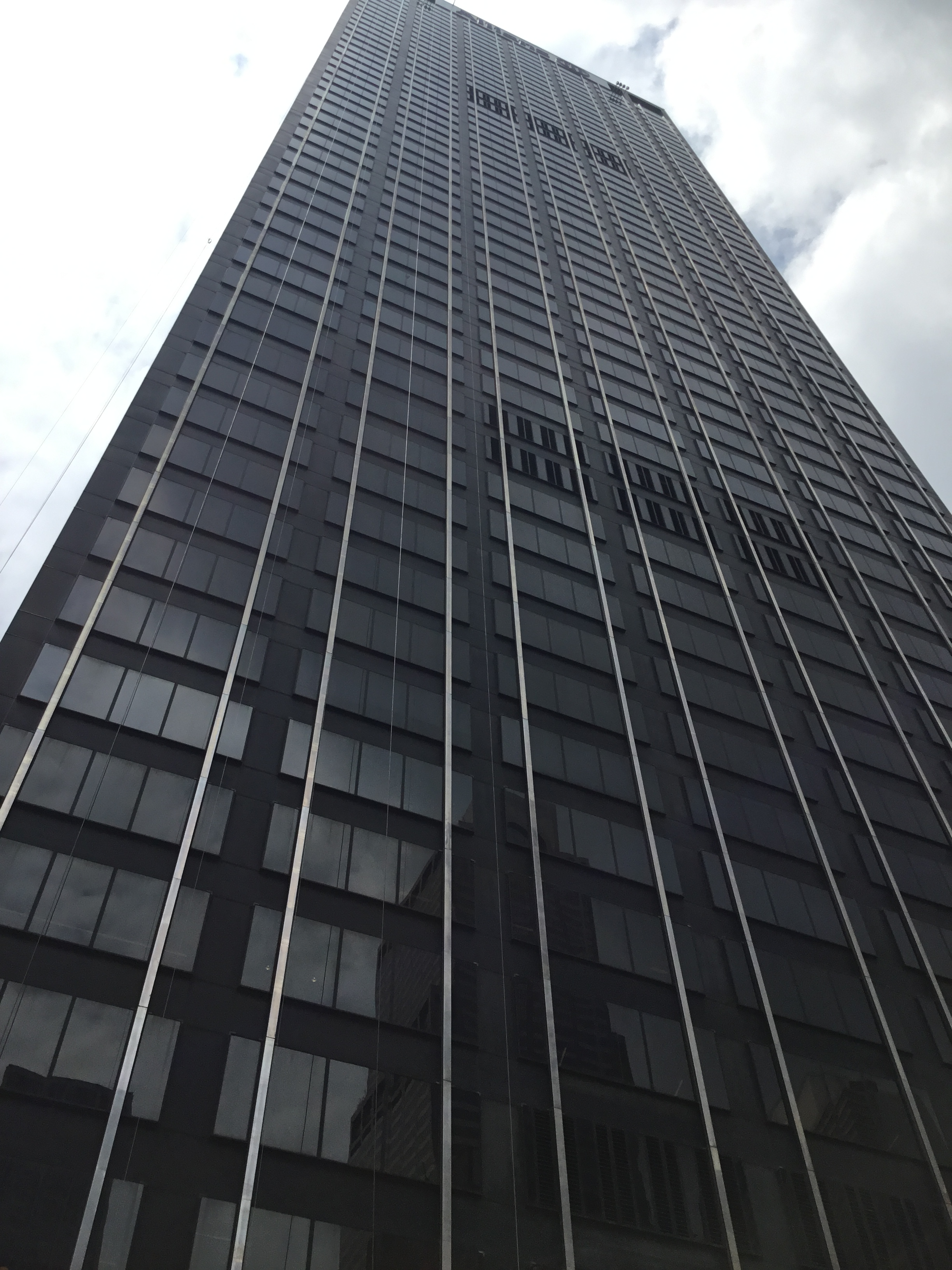
- Company headquarters at 1633 Broadway in Manhattan
- Type: Public
- Traded as: Nasdaq: VIRT (Class A); Russell 1000 component; S&P 600 component
- Industry: Financial services
- Founded: 2008; 18 years ago
- Founders: Vincent Viola; Douglas Cifu; Graham Free
- Headquarters: New York City, U.S.
- Key people: Michael Viola (chairman); Aaron Simons (CEO)
- Products: High-frequency trading, market making
- Revenue: ▲US$2.88 billion (2024)
- Operating income: ▲US$645 million (2024)
- Net income: ▲US$276.4 million (2024)
- Total assets: ▲US$15.4 billion (2024)
- Total equity: ▲US$1.25 billion (2024)
- Number of employees: 969 (2025)
- Subsidiaries: Global Electronic Trading Company; Investment Technology Group; KCG Holdings; Nyenburgh Holding B.V.
- Website: www.virtu.com

Virtu Financial, Inc. is an American electronic market making company. The company is headquartered in Manhattan, New York City.

As of 2026, Virtu is one of the largest market making firms in the United States along with Citadel Securities and Jane Street.

== Organization ==
Based in New York City, Virtu was founded by Vincent Viola, a former chairman of the New York Mercantile Exchange and current owner of the Florida Panthers. Douglas Cifu, Virtu's CEO from October 2013 to July 2025, co-founded Virtu with Viola in 2008, along with Graham Free.

The company suggested standards for electronic firms that call themselves market maker. Virtu believes market makers should be obligated to quote at or near the inside of the national best bid and offer throughout the day and quote at various price points in a number of different securities. Virtu was ranked as one of the five largest high-frequency traders of equities in Europe in 2011.

In November 2014, Reuters reported that Chris Concannon, president and chief operating officer at Virtu Financial, will succeed William O'Brien as president of BATS Global Markets, a trading venue that was founded by high-frequency traders.

Virtu has offices in New York City (headquarters), Austin, Los Angeles, Boston, Chicago, London, Sydney, Dublin, Hong Kong, and Singapore. It expanded its European headquarters to Dublin in September, 2013. Virtu Financial Ireland Limited is regulated by the Central Bank of Ireland.

=== History ===
In May 2011, Virtu merged with proprietary trading firm Madison Tyler, based in Santa Monica, California with the backing of Silver Lake Partners, a technology-focused private equity firm. Vincent Viola co-founded Madison Tyler with David Salomon, a former arbitrage trader at Goldman Sachs.

Virtu acquired a market-making unit that handles NYSE Amex stocks from Cohen Capital Group LLC in December 2011. The purchase made Virtu the largest overseer of trading in shares listed on Amex, known as the American Stock Exchange, before NYSE Euronext bought it for $260 million in 2008. The deal gave Virtu a designated market-maker license for New York Stock Exchange companies. With the acquisition, some of the companies Virtu was able to trade and support included New Gold Inc., Northern Oil & Gas Inc., and the American depositary receipts of British American Tobacco Plc.

In September 2012, Virtu acquired the exchange-traded fund (ETF) market maker assets of Nyenburgh Holding B.V., a high-frequency trader in European ETFs.

In April 2017, Virtu agreed to pay US$1.4 billion in cash to purchase rival market-making firm KCG Holdings. This acquisition was completed on July 20, 2017.

In November 2018, Virtu announced an approximately US$1 billion deal to acquire agency brokerage and financial markets technology firm Investment Technology Group. This acquisition was completed on March 1, 2019.

In November 2021, Virtu launched a new electronic swaptions workflow on its RFQ hub.

In May 2022, Virtu ITG Europe joined the SIX Swiss Exchange. Later, in June 2022, Virtu began collaborating with other financial firms, including Citadel Securities, Charles Schwab Corporation, Sequoia Capital, and Paradigm, as well as unnamed retail brokerages, to develop a cryptocurrency trading platform focused toward retail brokerages.

In December 2024, Bloomberg reported that Virtu was among multiple financial companies joining Global Futures and Options Ltd. (GFO-X), a London-based crypto derivatives platform.

In July 2025, Virtu Financial announced former chief executive officer Douglas Cifu's retirement, marking the first leadership change since the firm’s founding. He transitioned into an advisory role, relinquishing his position. In that same month, Virtu supported a proposal by the IEX to launch a new options exchange in the United States. The proposition included a 350-microsecond delay on trades, curbing high-frequency traders. Citadel Securities and the Securities Industry and Financial Markets Association opposed the plan.

=== IPO ===
Virtu Financial initially planned to go public in the first week of April 2014, then postponed its initial public offering by at least a week. At the time, prospective investors advised to wait and "let the storm pass", a reference to recent scrutiny concerning HFT practices. Later in April 2014, the company decided to ultimately postpone the IPO without specifying a new date. In its IPO plans, Virtu sought a valuation of about $3 billion. The IPO had been reported to make Vincent Viola the first high-frequency trading billionaire. While Virtu declined to comment, Reuters reported in November 2014 that sources say Virtu Financial hopes to go public in the spring of 2015. On April 15, 2015, Virtu Financial successfully priced its IPO which began trading on NASDAQ on April 16, 2015.

On November 12, 2015, Virtu Financial Inc priced a secondary public offering of its Class A common stock by Virtu and certain selling stockholders affiliated with Silver Lake Partners.

== Trading activity ==
Virtu operates on more than 235 exchanges, markets and dark pools in 36 countries. Some of these exchanges include NYSE Euronext, NASDAQ and the Chicago Mercantile Exchange. The company is a designated market maker on the NYSE and NYSE Amex. Virtu makes markets by providing passive quotations to buyers and sellers in more than 12,000 securities and other financial instruments.

On August 28, 2014, Virtu Financial, along with London-based GSA Capital, executed the first trades on ParFX Prime, a foreign exchange trading platform. Unlike most exchanges and trading venues, ParFX's matching engine does not adhere to the principle of price-time priority. Instead, ParFX subjects all orders to random pauses of about 20 to 80 milliseconds, trying to provide a more level playing field.

When filing for its IPO in March 2014, it was disclosed that during five years Virtu Financial made a profit 1,277 out of 1,278 days, losing money just one day.

Gregory Laughlin, astrophysicist and department chairman at the University of California, Santa Cruz, researched Virtu's trading activity. In the debate about its near-perfect trading record, Virtu said that it wins 51 percent or 52 percent of its trades, leading most people to figure the remainder are losses. In his research, Laughlin showed that "the number of its trades that break even are about the same as its losses", indicating Virtu assumes little market risk.

=== Investigations ===
In April 2014, New York Attorney General Eric Schneiderman sent Virtu a letter seeking information on its HFT practices, asking about special arrangements with dark pools and exchanges, the company's trading strategies and whether Virtu practices latency arbitrage, a high-frequency activity.

In July 2014, the Securities and Exchange Commission (SEC) sought information on ten HFT firms with broker-dealer licenses, including Virtu Financial, as part of an ongoing investigation into predatory trading strategies. The SEC's probe focuses on abuse of order types and abusive trading like layering or spoofing, a tactic intended to trick investors into buying or selling a stock at unfavorable prices. A settlement was announced in 2017.

John McCrank of Reuters noted that scrutiny around high-frequency trading intensified after the release of Michael Lewis's best-selling book Flash Boys: A Wall Street Revolt in March 2014.

In November 2022, Virtu sued the SEC, claiming that it did not respond to a public records request. The company submitted a Freedom of Information Act request earlier in June, seeking to review the SEC's measures to meet legal requirements in evaluating potential investor harm and market risks.

The company was investigated by the SEC in 2023 for failing to protect sensitive customer data. The SEC claimed that between January 2018 and April 2019 Virtu broker-dealer employees had access to customers' names, and the names, prices and volumes of securities that customers bought and sold. Virtu settled the matter in December 2025, agreeing to pay a $2.5 million fine while not admitting or denying any wrongdoing.
