= Deephaven Capital Management =

- Company type: Private
- Industry: Hedge funds
- Founded: 1994
- Founder: Irvin Kessler
- Defunct: 2009
- Headquarters: Minnetonka, Minnesota, U.S.
- AUM: US$4 billion (at its peak)
- Website: www.deephavenfunds.com

Deephaven Capital Management, LLC was a subsidiary of Knight Capital Group that managed various hedge funds. The company was later shutdown due to poor performance blamed on prevailing macro-economic environment.

== History ==
Deephaven Capital Management was established in 1994 with $5 million in assets by Irvin Kessler. It focused on event-driven funds in addition to five additional funds managed from its offices in Minnetonka, London, and Hong Kong. At its peak, the company managed $4 billion in assets in six different hedge funds. Kessler sold the company in 2000 to Knight Capital Group although he continued to work there for a few more years before leaving to found Provident Advisors and later Walleye Capital.

The SEC investigated Deephaven Capital in 2006, accusing one of its portfolio managers of insider trading involving 19 of its Private investment in public equity (PIPE) offerings. The hedge fund agreed to pay the sum of $5.8 million in disgorgement, penalties and interests including $2.7 million paid for unlawful profit and $343,000 pre-judgment interest. The portfolio manager also paid $110,000 as part of the civil penalty.

In late 2008, Deephaven froze its Global Multi-Strategy Fund with assets of $1.6 billion. The fund lost 32% in 2008, which resulted in investors requesting to withdraw 30% of their funds. Until then, the fund had yearly returns of 16%. In its 2008 filings, Deephaven reported a $5.7 million pretax quarterly loss, leading to a drastic slide of its $4 billion asset at the beginning of the year to $2.7 billion by October. In 2009, Deephaven sold its assets in the Global Multi-Strategy Fund to Stark Investments for up to $44.5 million after an initial payment of $7.3 million. Upon the sale, Deephaven's remaining assets were sold off; the office furniture was sold for cents on the dollar to a local asset manager, Disciplined Growth Investors.
