= The Kyoto College of Graduate Studies for Informatics =

Internet technology school in Kyoto, Japan

Coordinates: 35°1′50.4″N 135°46′45.8″E

- 京都情報大学院大学
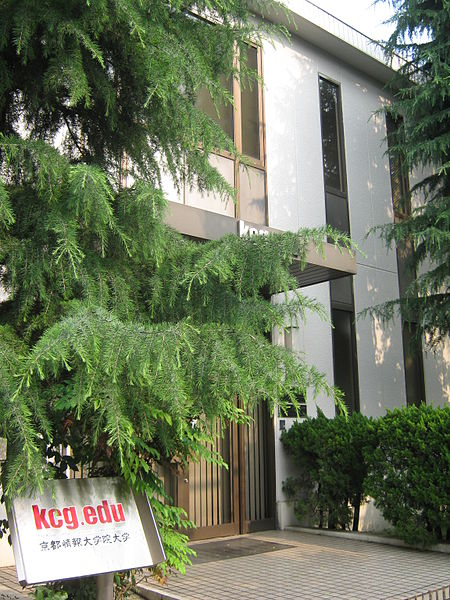
- Type: Private internet technology professional school
- Established: 2004
- Parent institution: The University of Informatics
- Affiliations: Kyoto-fu Joho Sangyo Kyokai 京都府情報産業協会 , Japan (Nippon) Association for Information Sciences (NAIS)
- President: Yoichi Terashita
- Location: Kyoto-shi, Kyoto-fu, Japan
- Website: http://www.kcg.edu/

The Kyoto College of Graduate Studies for Informatics (KCGI) is an internet technology school located in Kyoto, Japan. It offers a Master's Degree in Applied Information Technology (M. S. IT) focussing on web business technology and web systems development. The college has an international presence.

== Location ==
KCG’s main campus, Eki-mae, is located near Kyoto Station in Minami ward, Kyoto. The Computer Graphics Art Department is located at the Kamogawa campus and the Computer Informatics Department is at the Rakuhoku campus. The KCGI is housed in the Hyakumanben building in Sakyo ward, Kyoto. The KCG group includes the Kyoto Japanese Language Training Center (KJLTC). It is accredited by the Association for the Promotion of Japanese Language Education and authorized by the Ministry of Education as a preparatory school. There is also KCG Career incorporated and the KCG company limited.

The KCG has a presence in Beijing and New York City. In 2002, the KCG opened an office at the Parliament Library of Beijing. Its function was to provide a base for deeper academic exchange with Chinese universities and to support IT education in China. In 2000, the KGC opened an office in New York City in the World Trade Center. After the September 11 attacks, the office was moved to the Rockefeller Center and reopened in 2004.

== History ==
The Kyoto College of Graduate Studies for Informatics (KCGI) was established in 2004. It was formed as part of the KCG Group which was headed by the Kyoto Computer Gakuin (KCG). KCG was founded in 1963 by Yasuko and Shigeo Hasegawa.

KCG's incumbent head is Yasuko Hasegawa. She was the first woman to receive a doctoral degree in astrophysics from Kyoto University. Yasuko Hasegawa and Shigeo Hasegawa (died 1986) formed a study group for IBM 709/7090. In 1963, at Kyoto university they taught young faculty members, research scientists and graduate students. Their workshop was called the "Fortran Research Seminar". The workshop taught the uses of the computer programming language, Fortran. The workshop was later renamed the "Kyoto Software Research Seminar". In 1969, the "Kyoto Software Research Seminar" was renamed the "Kyoto Computer Gakuin" (KCG).

The Kyoto Software Research Seminar group increased its membership with participants from outside academe. In the latter part of the 1960s the number of Japanese made computers increased. One such computer was the locally made "HITAC-10" computer. Using these computers, the seminar was able to conduct courses on programming and student numbers increased. Later, the KCG acquired the medium-scale-computer, the TOSBAC3400 from Toshiba; IBM's main frames, the IBM 370, 4341, 3031; and the large-scale UNIVAC 1100 and 1106 computers.

In 1983, when PCs became available, the KCG was able to provide a free PC loan program to students.

== International affiliations ==
=== International Development of Computer Education program ===
The International Development of Computer Education (IDCE) is an effort by KCG's programs to expand computer education in various countries. It was commenced in 1988 by Yasuko Hasegawa and her daughter, Yu Hasegawa (a.k.a. Yu Hasegawa-Johnson) when three hundred fifty 8-bit personal computers were donated to Thailand’s secondary and upper level schools. Other recipients of the program include Ghana, Poland, Kenya, Peru, and Zimbabwe. The program aims to enhance basic computer literacy and serves also as a medium for encouraging cultural exchange between Japan and participating countries.

=== Academic exchange agreements ===
The KCG Group has academic exchange agreements with the Rochester Institute of Technology (RIT) College of Imaging Arts and Sciences and the RIT B.Thomas Golisano College of Computing and Information Sciences. It also has exchange arrangements with the Tianjin University of Science Technology (TUST), the Dalian University of Foreign Languages, the Fujian Normal University, the Nanjing University of Technology, the Korea University Graduate School of Information Security, and the Cheju National University as well as the VSB – Technical University of Ostrava. On May 15, 2008, the KCG Group and the University of Pardubice Tribhuvan University Nepal signed a memorandum of understanding for an academic exchange agreement by holding ceremonies using video conferencing technology.

== dot Kyoto ==
KCGI has been designated as the primary managing body of the .kyoto generic top-level domain (gTLD) in 2012. The .kyoto gTLD itself has been operational since 2015, and open for general registration from the public since 2016.

Presently, registrations for a .kyoto domain are available through several domestic (in Japan) and international registries. Some examples include (but are not limited to)

- Domestic:
  - Gonbei Domain
  - Onamae.com
  - Kagoya
  - JPRS
- International:
  - gandi.net
  - Namecheap
  - eurodns
  - 101Domain
