= Execution management system =

Financial market trading system

An Execution management system, or EMS, is an application utilized by traders designed to display market data and provide seamless and fast access to trading destinations for the purpose of transacting orders. This application contains broker provided and independent algorithms such as TWAP and VWAP, global market data and technology that is able to help predict certain market conditions. One of the important features of EMS is the capacity to manage orders across multiple trading destinations such as stock exchanges, stock brokerage firms, crossing networks and electronic communication networks.

In addition to commercial vendors, a few open-source projects can be counted in as EMS, although their breadth varies.

== See also ==
- Algorithmic trading
- Dark liquidity
- Electronic trading platform
- High-frequency trading
- Order management system
- Single-dealer platform
