= Kyoto Computer Gakuin =

Private university in Japan

Coordinates: 34°59′6.1″N 135°45′9.2″E

- 京都コンピュータ学院
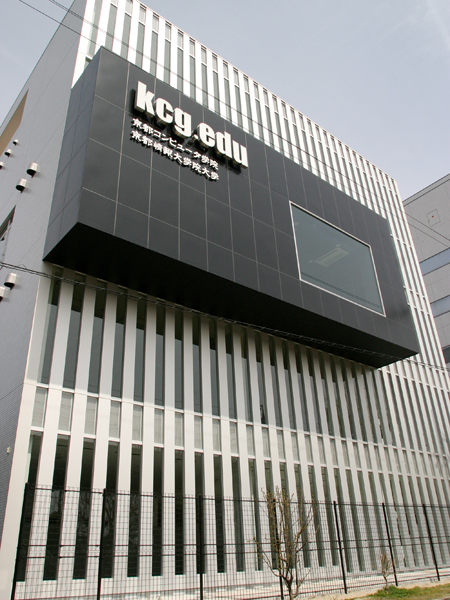
- Type: Private
- Established: 1969
- Affiliations: Kyoto-fu Joho Sangyo Kyokai 京都府情報産業協会
- President: Mme. Yasuko Hasegawa
- Location: Kyoto, Kyoto, Japan
- Website: http://www.kcg.ac.jp/

Kyoto Computer Gakuin (KCG) is a private vocational school in Kyoto, Japan, founded in 1963 by Yasuko and Shigeo Hasegawa. It is operated by the KCG Group. KCG’s Eki-mae is the main campus which is located near the Kyoto Station. KCG also has other sites at the Kamogawa Campus which houses the Computer Graphics Art Department and the Rakuhoku Campus where the Computer Informatics Department is found.

The KCG Group also operates The Kyoto College of Graduate Studies for Informatics (KCGI), the Kyoto Japanese Language Training Center (KJLTC), KCG Career, Inc. and KCG Co., Ltd. The group's affiliated schools have graduated 37,000 alumni.

== History ==
Kyoto Computer Gakuin was established by Yasuko and Shigeo Hasegawa in 1963. Yasuko Hasegawa, the first woman to be enrolled at Kyoto University's doctoral program in Astrophysics, formed a study group for IBM 709/7090 and started teaching to graduate students at Kyoto University. They called the workshop as "the FORTRAN Research Seminar" which was later renamed as the "Kyoto Software Research Seminar". This workshop became Kyoto Computer Gakuin (Kyoto School of Computer Science) in 1969. Japan was then entering a period of economic growth and recovery in the post-war period and computers were still rare at that time. Only a handful of organizations like major banks, university research centers and airline companies possessed computer technology.

=== Founders ===
Yasuko and Shigeo Hasegawa organized the "FORTRAN Research Seminar" in Kyoto in 1963, which later developed in the KCG Group. There was an urgent need to have this kind of research group studying programming languages. However, there were neither accessible computer equipment nor books on computing in bookstores and FORTRAN could be used in Japan on a few computers which at that time were all imported. Under the ill-equipped environment of those times, Yasuko Hasegawa, the incumbent KCG president, struggled to develop a computer education system. In 1986, KCG co-founder Shigeo Hasegawa died at the age of 56.

=== From Kyoto’s FORTRAN Research Seminar to The Kyoto Software Research Seminar ===
The FORTRAN Research Seminar was started as the independent seminar which studied the uses and applications of FORTRAN. All the attendees were young research scientists from Kyoto University. "The FORTRAN Research Seminar" was renamed as the "Kyoto Software Research Seminar".

The uses of software was studied from a wider perspective, as the Kyoto Software Research Seminar group took in members not only from the academic community but from various sectors of society and subsequently the members found themselves involved in various educational activities.

The latter part of 1960s saw the emergence of Japanese made computers. By using the locally made "HITAC-10" computer, the seminar group was able to conduct courses on programming and as students increased, Hasegawa’s group had to rent an extra room as a computer laboratory.

In 1969, the "Kyoto Software Research Seminar" was renamed as "Kyoto Computer Gakuin". In the subsequent years, computer facilities of the school rapidly increased with the growing demand for computer education.

=== Outreach program: The early years ===
In the beginning, KCG founders Yasuko and Shigeo Hasegawa set the example by taking it upon themselves to transport the HITAC-10 in their car whenever there was a need to give lectures in faraway venues.

Later, KCG acquired the medium-scale-computer of Toshiba; the TOSBAC3400, IBM's main frames—the IBM 370, 4341, 3031; the large-scale UNIVAC (later called UNISYS) 1100, 1106 computers. In 1983 when the PC was just coming out of the market, KCG acquired a large number of PCs and initiated a PC Loan Program lending PCs to all KCG students for free.

== Academics ==
=== International Development of Computer Education Program (IDCE): KCG Group’s current global outreach program ===
The International Development of Computer Education (IDCE) program is a special program to expand computer education initiated in 1988 by Yasuko Hasegawa and her daughter Yu Hasegawa (a.k.a. Yu Hasegawa-Johnson). Over the past several years, the IDCE program has donated almost 3,000 computers and provided computer instruction to countries in Asia, Europe, Africa, and South America. IDCE's launched its first project by donating 350 8-bit personal computers to the government of Thailand. The computers were distributed to Thailand’s secondary and upper level schools in 1988. IDCE then went to other countries such as Ghana, Poland, Kenya, Peru, and Zimbabwe. As of March 2008, 21 countries have been benefited by IDCE.

IDCE's goal is to widen access to basic computers for educational purposes in developing countries, where often there is no public access to computer technology. The program aims to enhance basic computer literacy and serves also as a medium for encouraging cultural exchange between Japan and participating countries.

=== Academic Exchange Agreements ===
The KCG Group of institutions also has academic exchange agreements with various institutions with Information Technology programs in the US (Rochester Institute of Technology College of Imaging Arts and Sciences and B. Thomas Golisano College of Computing and Information Sciences (RIT), in Asia (China's Tianjin University of Science and Technology (TUST), Dalian University of Foreign Language, Fujian Normal University, Nanjing University of Technology and Korea's Korea University Graduate School of Information Security), Cheju National University, and in Europe (the Czech Republic's VSB-Technical University of Ostrava).

On May 15, 2008 the KCG Group (including KCG and The Kyoto College of Graduate Studies for Informatics) and the University of Pardubice, one of the best national universities in the Czech Republic held the world's first online academic exchange agreement signing ceremonies between two universities in Japan and Europe. The KCG Group and the University of Pardubice signed the memorandum of understanding for academic exchange agreement by holding ceremonies using video conferencing technology.

=== KCG’s RIT Summer Workshop ===
KCG’s academic agreement with RIT was established in 1996. Since then KCG organizes the RIT Summer workshop where students get the chance to attend classes at RIT’s College of Imaging Arts and Sciences and B. Golisano College of Computing and Information Sciences and have a feel of campus life in the US as well as see the sights in Rochester, Niagara Falls and New York City.

=== Kyoto Japanese Language Training Center ===
The Kyoto Japanese Language Training Center is an institution accredited by the Association for the Promotion of Japanese Language Education and authorized by the Ministry of Education as a preparatory school (currently there are only 17 approved schools in Japan).

=== Kyoto Computer Gakuin - Beijing Office ===
The office has been established in the Parliament Library of Beijing in 2002, as base of deeper academic exchange with Chinese universities and to support IT education in China.

=== Kyoto Computer Gakuin - New York Office ===
The office was established in World Trade Center in 2000 as a base of overseas projects of the KCG group. The office was moved to the Rockefeller Center in 2004 and resumed operations after the terrorist attacks in New York City.

== Environment and location ==
The Eki-mae campus is centrally located in the Minami Ward of Kyoto City in Japan. It is accessible from the Kyoto Station, the gateway into Kyoto, the ancient capital of Japan. Kyoto is known to be a "student-friendly city" with several amenities and reasonable housing, food and shopping facilities that cater to its large student population due to the location of universities and schools in the area.
