= KCG Holdings =

American financial service

- Type: Subsidiary
- Traded as: NYSE: KCG
- Industry: Financial services
- Founded: 2013 from merger of Knight Capital Group and Getco LLC
- Headquarters: New York City, New York, United States
- Key people: Daniel Coleman, Chief Executive Officer
- Products: Market making and trading
- Revenue: ▲US$ 1.45 billion (2016)
- Net income: ▼US$ 61.1 million (2014)
- Total assets: ▼US$ 6.830 billion (2014)
- Total equity: ▲US$ 1.522 billion (2014)
- Number of employees: 1,093 (2014)
- Parent: Virtu Financial
- Subsidiaries: NetDelta LLC
- Website: www.kcg.com

KCG Holdings, Inc. was an American global financial services firm engaging in market making, high-frequency trading, electronic execution, and institutional sales and trading. The company was formed on July 1, 2013, upon the completion of the merger between Knight Capital Group, Inc. and GETCO Holding Company, LLC. Global growth equity firm General Atlantic, who had a 25% stake in GETCO, made an additional equity investment at the time of the merger. Rene Kern, managing director at General Atlantic joined the board of directors

On April 20, 2017, KCG announced that it had agreed to be acquired by Virtu Financial for $20 per share in cash in a deal valued at approximately $1.4 billion.

== History ==
Getco LLC was founded in 1999 by Stephen Schuler and Daniel Tierney, former floor traders in Chicago, and had 400 employees at the time of the merger. The firm's primary business was electronic market making/high-frequency trading, though it also provided execution algorithms and a dark pool through its client services arm, Getco Execution Services.

Knight Capital Group was founded in 1995 as Knight/Trimark Group and had about 1400 employees at the time of the merger. Its largest business was market-making in US equities for retail brokerages, though it also provided other services such as electronic execution, dark pools, plus institutional sales and trading. In August 2012, a technological/managerial breakdown subsequently dubbed the "Knightmare" caused Knight to lose $460m in the course of one trading day, nearly putting the firm out of business. In December 2012, it agreed to be acquired by Getco LLC. The merger was approved by the respective stockholders and unitholders of both companies on June 25, 2013.

On July 8, 2013, chief executive officer Daniel Coleman rang the opening bell at the New York Stock Exchange, marking the completion of Knight and Getco's merger and the unveiling of a new corporate identity, KCG Holdings.

In 2014, 27 million shares of Platinum Studios were acquired by KCG Holdings.

In January 2015, KCG Holdings announced it would be selling its foreign exchange trading platform KCG Hotspot to BATS Global Markets for $365 million.

In April 2017, Virtu Financial announced that it would purchase KCG Holdings for US$1.4 billion in cash. The acquisition closed on July 20, 2017.

== See also ==
- Merrill Lynch, Pierce, Fenner & Smith Inc. v. Manning, a 2016 Supreme Court case involving naked short selling claims against KCG and Merrill Lynch, among others.
