= Vincent Viola =

American businessman (born 1956)

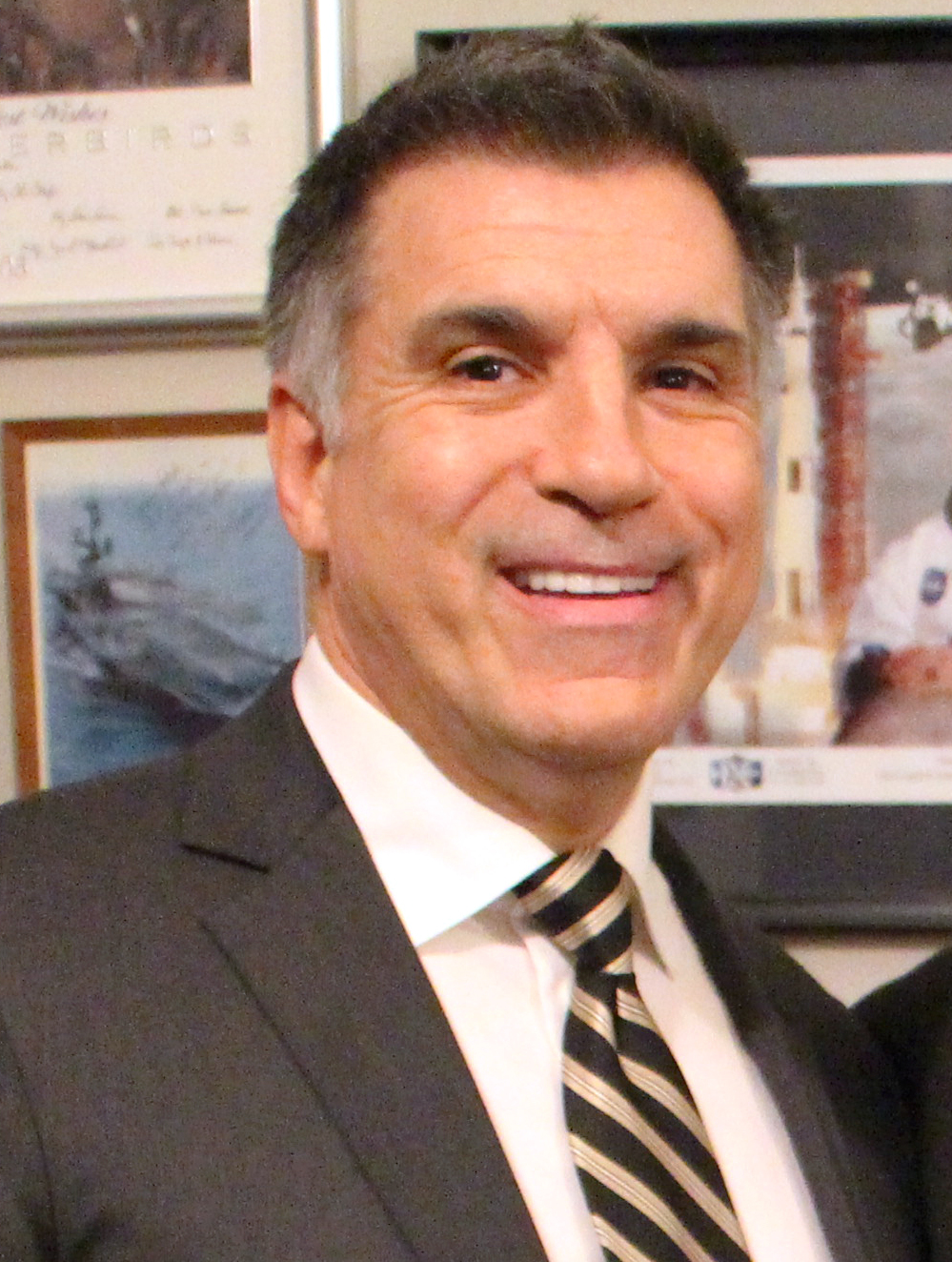
- Viola in 2017
- Born: Vincent James Viola; 1956 (age 69–70); New York City, U.S.
- Education: United States Military Academy (BS); New York Law School (JD)
- Political party: Republican
- Spouse: Teresa Viola
- Children: 3

Vincent "Vinnie" Viola (born 1956) is an American billionaire high frequency trader and U.S. Army veteran. For several weeks in 2016 he was President Donald Trump's nominee for United States Secretary of the Army, before withdrawing from consideration. Viola is the owner of the Florida Panthers of the National Hockey League (NHL), and the founder and Chairman Emeritus of Virtu Financial. He is also the owner of St. Elias Stables and co-owner, with fellow Brooklynite Anthony Bonomo, of the 2017 Kentucky Derby winner Always Dreaming. From 2001 to 2004, he was the chairman of the New York Mercantile Exchange (NYMEX).

As of 2025, Viola has a reported net worth of US$6.2 billion.

== Early life ==
Viola was born in 1956 to an Italian-American family in the Williamsburg neighborhood of Brooklyn, New York City, the son of Virginia (Torre) and John A. Viola. His father, an immigrant from Italy, worked as a truck driver after serving in the U.S. Army in the European theater of WWII. Upon graduating from Brooklyn Technical High School, Viola attended the United States Military Academy at West Point, New York. Viola played on the sprint football team and was cadet company commander for Company E-4 his senior year.

Viola graduated with a bachelor's degree from the United States Military Academy in 1977 and was commissioned as a second lieutenant in the United States Army. After graduating from the Infantry Officer Basic Course and Ranger School, he served with the 101st Airborne Division at Fort Campbell for several years. He received his juris doctor degree from New York Law School in June 1983, but did not complete the New York bar exam.

== Career ==
Viola began his business career as a trader in the New York Mercantile Exchange (NYMEX) in 1982, raising $10,000 to purchase a seat on the exchange. He helped build the NYMEX while he served on the board of directors, as chairman of the Technology Committee, the Natural Gas Advisory Committee and the Facilities Committee, co-chairman of the Options Committee, vice chairman of NYMEX from 1993 to 1996, and chairman from March 2001 to March 2004.

In 1985, he founded Pioneer Futures, one of the top fifty futures commission merchants in the US. In 1988, he founded The Independent Bank Group, a Texas-based regional bank which is listed on NASDAQ (IBTX). Viola was also one of the two partners who launched EWT, LLC and Madison Tyler, LLC, two electric trading firms formerly based in Beverly Hills, California, and was able to use the electronic trading technique to his own personal gain. In 2008, Viola founded Virtu Financial, active in electronic market making. Viola took Virtu Financial public in April 2015, trading as a NASDAQ listed company (VIRT).

Leah McGrath Goodman's 2011 book, The Asylum: The Renegades Who Hijacked the World's Oil Market, describes Viola and his temperament. Goodman wrote that Viola "had a nasty temper, but [predecessor chairman Lou] Guttman says he didn't lose control of his emotions easily" and that "beneath the spit and polish he was still a tough guy from Brooklyn." In the book, Lou Guttman, the previous chairman at the NYMEX, said Viola "exuded leadership. His personality was amazing. He drew people in. He was a phenomenal speaker. Even if he didn't know what he was talking about, he sounded like he knew what he was saying. He was an astute businessman and an extreme opportunist."

Viola is the principal owner of the Florida Panthers of the National Hockey League (NHL), which he purchased in September 2013 for $250 million. When he first arrived, the Panthers were almost two years removed from their first playoff appearance in 12 years and had finished last in the Eastern Conference the previous season. However, star players such as Aleksander Barkov, Jonathan Huberdeau, and Aaron Ekblad were able to ignite the team over the next few years, eventually leading the Panthers to the playoffs in 2016. During Viola's tenure as owner, the Panthers have achieved great success, making the playoffs every year since 2020, winning their first playoff series in 26 years in 2022, and going to three straight Stanley Cup Finals from 2023 to 2025 and winning two straight Stanley Cups in 2024 and 2025.

In 2004, Viola, along with a group of investors, purchased the New Jersey Nets of the NBA. Prior to this purchase, Viola was required to divest his racing interests. When the team was sold in 2010, Viola returned to racing.

== Nomination for Secretary of the Army ==
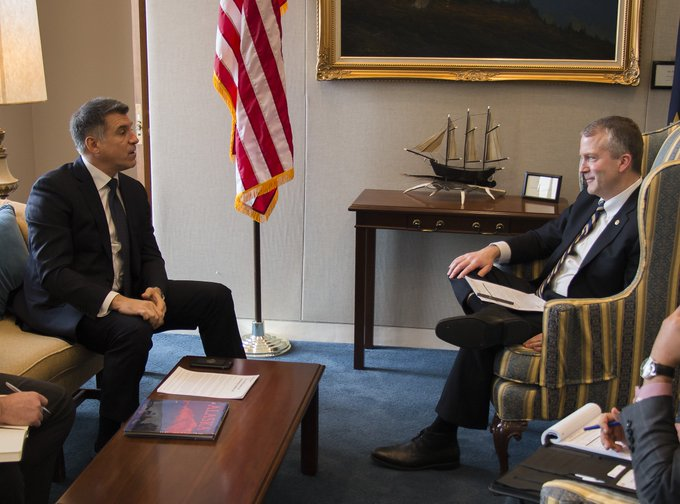
Viola (left) speaking to Senator Dan Sullivan in January 2017

On December 19, 2016, then-President-elect Donald Trump announced his intention to nominate Viola for the position of Secretary of the Army. The choice was reported to be concerning to the nominated Secretary of Defense General Jim Mattis, who was reportedly not informed of the choice prior to the announcement, a position he would directly oversee, and was concerned about potential trading practices which were not yet fully investigated.

Viola withdrew himself from consideration for the position on February 3, 2017, citing his inability to comply with Pentagon regulations regarding personal businesses. Military Times reported that Viola had been searching for ways to divest from his business ventures, including transferring ownership of the Florida Panthers to his family members and transferring responsibility for operations to Vice Chairman Douglas Cifu.

== Philanthropy ==
After the September 11 attacks, Viola helped found the Combating Terrorism Center at West Point, and was the principal funder at its creation. Viola founded a technology company, Rowan Technology Solutions, to support cadet education in the areas of military history, military science, and leadership. Viola has endowed the Avery Cardinal Dulles, S.J. Chair in Catholic Theology at Fordham University.

== Personal life ==
Viola and his wife Teresa have three adult sons and live in New York City. In 2013, their Upper East Side townhouse was listed for sale at $114 million. In January 2021, they sold their townhouse in the Brooklyn Heights Historical District for $25.5 million, setting a borough record.

Both Viola and his wife are involved in horse racing as the owners of St. Elias Stable and Teresa Viola Racing. They are co-owners of Kentucky Derby winner Always Dreaming.

Viola was inducted into the FIA Futures Hall of Fame in 2009.

Sporting positions
Preceded by Alan Cohen	Florida Panthers owner 2013–present	Incumbent
