= Citadel LLC =

American hedge fund and financial services provider

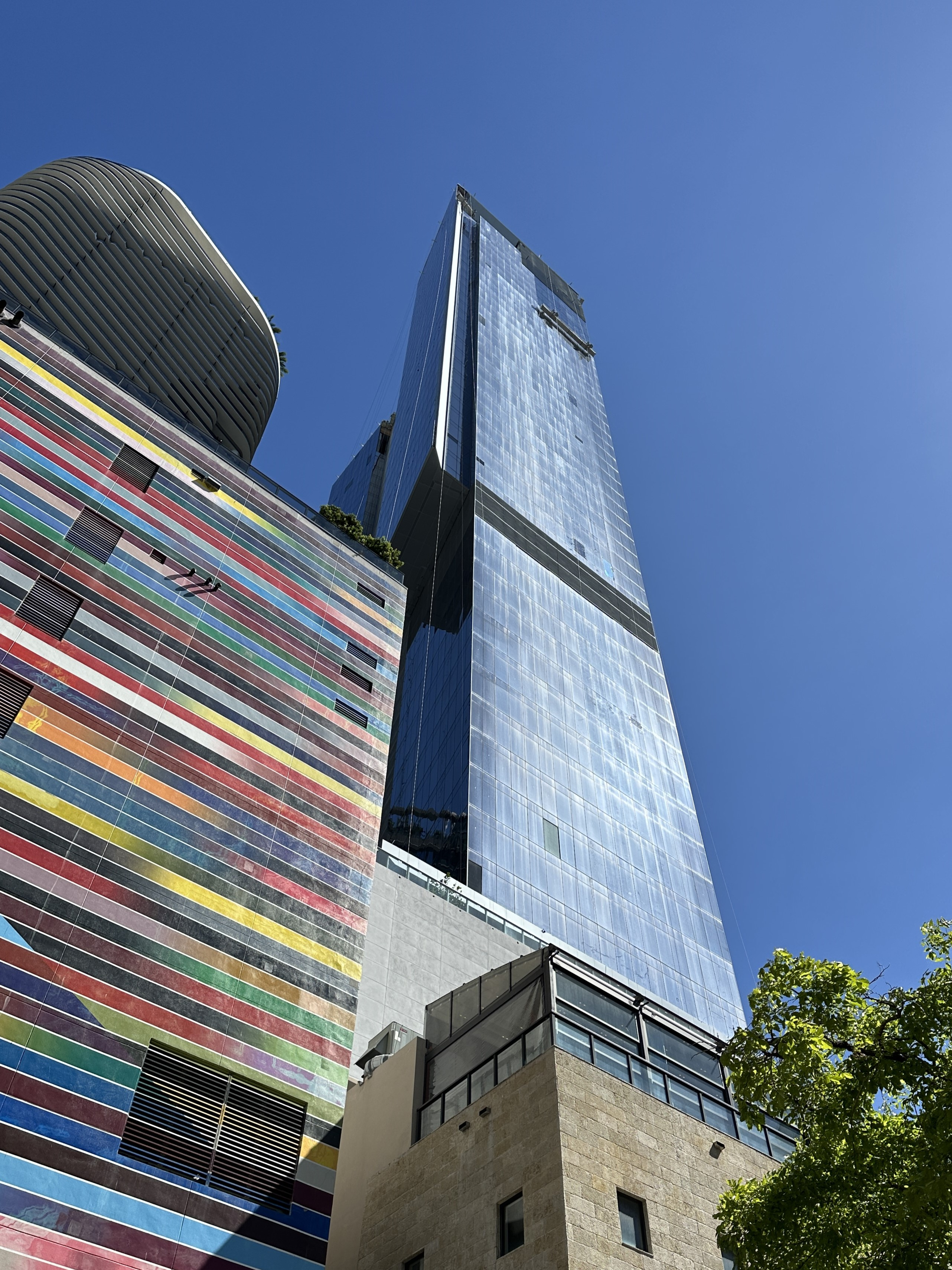
- Headquarters at 830 Brickell Plaza
- Type: Private
- Industry: Financial services
- Predecessor: Wellington Financial (1990–1994); Citadel Investment Group (1994–2013)
- Founded: 1990; 36 years ago in Chicago, Illinois, U.S.
- Founder: Kenneth Griffin
- Headquarters: 830 Brickell Plaza, Miami, Florida, U.S.
- Key people: Kenneth Griffin (CEO & Co-CIO); Pablo Salame (Co-CIO); Gerald A. Beeson (COO)
- Products: Alternative investments
- AUM: US$77 billion (2026)
- Owner: Kenneth Griffin (85%)
- Number of employees: 3,153 (2024)
- Rating: S&P Global: BBB−
- Website: citadel.com

Citadel LLC (formerly known as Citadel Investment Group, LLC) is an American multinational hedge fund and financial services company. Founded in 1990 by Kenneth Griffin, it has more than $77 billion in assets under management as of January 2026. The company has over 3,100 employees, with corporate headquarters in Miami, Florida, and offices throughout North America, Asia, and Europe. Founder, CEO and Co-CIO Griffin owns approximately 85% of the firm. As of December 2025, Citadel has posted $90.4 billion in net gains since its inception in 1990, making one of the "most successful hedge funds in history", according to LCH Investments, and CNBC.

Citadel LLC is legally distinct from the market maker Citadel Securities, although both were founded and are owned by Griffin and remain under common ownership structures. In January 2022, Citadel Securities raised $1.15 billion from Sequoia Capital and Paradigm at a valuation of $22 billion, in its first outside investment since its founding.

== History ==
=== Founding, 1990–2000 ===
Griffin started his trading career out of his dorm room at Harvard University in 1987, trading convertible bonds. As a sophomore, he hooked a satellite dish to the roof of his dormitory. After graduating with a degree in economics, Griffin joined Chicago-based hedge fund Glenwood Partners. Citadel was started with $4.6 million in capital. Citadel was originally named Wellington Financial Group after its flagship fund. The company name was changed to Citadel in 1994. Within eight years, the firm had more than $2 billion in assets under management.

In 1998, Citadel started requiring investors to accept terms that "significantly restrict[ed] their ability to withdraw their capital", according to Institutional Investor. When hedge fund Long Term Capital Management collapsed later that year, Citadel's capital lockdown made it "a rare buyer, as desperate hedge funds unloaded bond inventory".

=== 2001–2010 ===
In 2001, Griffin began recruiting the energy traders from Enron the day after it collapsed for a new business including "a team of traders, meteorologists and researchers" building amongst the industry's biggest energy trading groups at the time.

In 2006, Citadel and JPMorgan Chase took over the energy portfolio and division of failed hedge fund Amaranth Advisors, which had suffered a 65% ($6 billion) loss in assets. In November 2006, Citadel issued $2 billion of investment-grade bonds to borrow money at a lower rate than otherwise able.

In 2007, Citadel invested $2.5 billion in E-Trade. This transaction included acquiring E-Trade's securitized subprime mortgages, collateralized debt obligations (CDOs), and second lien loans, as well as 12.5% senior unsecured notes, and 84,687,686 shares of common stock (equal to 19.99% of the then currently outstanding shares). Citadel received a seat on the board of directors. Citadel sold its remaining stake in E*Trade in 2013.

During the 2008 financial crisis, for 10 months, Griffin barred his investors from withdrawing money, attracting criticism. At the peak of the crisis, the firm was losing "hundreds of millions of dollars each week". It was leveraged 7:1 and the biggest funds at Citadel finished 2008 down 55%. However, they rebounded with a 62% return in 2009.

=== 2011–2020 ===
On January 17, 2012, Citadel's flagship funds, Citadel Kensington Global Strategies Fund Ltd and Citadel Wellington LLC, crossed their respective high watermarks, earning back the 50% of assets lost during the 2008 financial crisis. Having made up the losses, Citadel could once again charge client fees for managing their money and take a percentage of profits. Citadel under Griffin's leadership was reported as differentiating from hedge funds rivals post 2008 financial crisis with an "aggressive expansion". Starting at the beginning of 2014, over an 18 months period the hedge fund's assets under management increased $10 billion; from $16 billion to $26 billion as a result of "a 29% rise for its main hedge funds and a flow of new cash". In January 2020, Citadel Securities paid a $97 million settlement to China, after Chinese regulators ended a long-standing investigation into Citadel and other companies.

In 2014, Citadel became the first foreign hedge fund to complete a yuan fundraising as part of a program to allow Chinese investors to invest in overseas hedge funds.

In July 2020, during the coronavirus pandemic, Citadel created a "bubble" for a class of 100 interns by renting out a luxury resort in Wisconsin.

==== Former companies ====
Citadel Solutions was Citadel's fund administration arm. The company changed its name to Omnium in 2009 and was sold to Northern Trust in 2011.

Citadel Technology, established in 2009, was a wholly owned and independently operated affiliate of Citadel. It offered investment management technology, developed internally at Citadel, to a wide range of firms and funds. In 2013, Citadel Technology announced a partnership with REDI. The partnership combines Citadel's order management system (OMS) with REDI's execution management capabilities (EMS).

Aptigon Capital was formed in 2016 after Citadel LLC hired 17 portfolio managers from its rival Visium Asset Management which was in the process of closing down. It was originally led by Richard Schimel until he left Citadel in 2018; being replaced by Eric Felder. Felder led the unit until its closure in 2019 after Felder's departure from the company.

=== 2021–present ===
In January 2021, Citadel and Point72 Asset Management invested $2.75 billion in Melvin Capital, after Melvin Capital lost 53% of its value owing to the GameStop short squeeze.

In 2021, Citadel ranked second among the top money managers for net gains.

In a letter to employees on June 23, 2022, Griffin announced they would be moving their headquarters to Miami, Florida, due to a more favorable business climate and increased crime complaints in Chicago.

In December 2022, Citadel signed a deal with Vornado Realty Trust and Rudin Management Co. to master lease a new $1.2 billion, 1,500 feet (460 m) office tower to be constructed on Park Avenue in Midtown Manhattan to serve as Citadel's new New York City headquarters to solidify access to deep pools of global capital as well as connectivity with Asian clientele.

In 2022, Citadel's hedge fund unit posted its record year of revenues to date, generating about $28 billion in revenue. Citadel returned $16 billion to its clients in 2022, which was a record annual return for both the fund of American investor Kenneth Griffin and the entire industry. In addition, this allowed Citadel to overtake Bridgewater in the list of the most profitable hedge funds in history according to experts from LCH Investments.

In 2023, Citadel returned about $7 billion in profits to its clients, which amounted to about a 15% return for its flagship fund.

In June 2024, Citadel agreed to purchase Japanese power company Energy Grid. The transaction was the first major US investment in Japan's wholesale energy market in the past few years.

As of June 2024, Citadel managed more than $63 billion in capital and was one of the world's largest asset managers. In 2023 Citadel was ranked the second largest multi-strategy hedge fund globally. Citadel's group of hedge funds rank among the largest and most successful hedge funds in the world.

In March 2025, Citadel purchased Paloma Natural Gas (now Apex Natural Gas) for about $1 billion.

In September 2025, Citadel announced it would take office space atop Boston's new South Station Tower.

In October 2025, Citadel LLC announced it would acquire German power trading firm, FlexPower.

In October 2025, Citadel agreed to acquire FlexPower, a Hamburg-based renewable energy trading firm founded in 2022 that specializes in trading and risk management solutions across six European countries. It manages over 1,700 megawatts of power capacity. The acquisition, the terms of which were not disclosed, was part of Citadel's broader expansion in the global energy and commodities markets and followed the earlier acquisition of Paloma Natural Gas LLC in the United States.

Citadel's assets under management (AUM) increased to $67 billion at the start of 2026, and they returned approximately $5 billion to investors.

== Activities ==
=== Investment strategies ===
Citadel manages funds across equities, commodities, fixed income, quantitative strategies, and credit.

=== Reinsurance ===
In 2004, Citadel founded CIG Reinsurance Ltd (CIG Re), a Bermuda-based catastrophe reinsurer providing $450 million in capital. Citadel additionally founded $500 million reinsurer New Castle Re in 2005, seeking to capitalize on rising prices for reinsurance in the wake of Hurricane Katrina's damage to property coverage costs. In 2006, Citadel's two funds, CIG Re and New Castle Re, had approximately 10 percent of its assets invested in reinsurance.

Citadel wound down CIG Re in November 2008 because the company could not achieve a financial strength rating, and as a result could not compete in comparison to other companies in the industry. In January 2009, Citadel placed New Castle Re into run-off.

=== Investment strategy and risk management ===
The firm's risk management philosophy is focused on risk capital allocation, stress exposure and liquidity management. Citadel's risk management center has 36 monitors displaying more than 50,000 instruments being traded within the firm's portfolios. The firm runs 500 stress tests each day to simulate the impact of potential economic and geopolitical crises or other market dislocation. Citadel aggregates investment positions on trading screens to calculate "more than 500 doomsday scenarios" to assess the potential of risk for the firm.

In 2014, Citadel rated an A grade for risk management in the annual Institutional Investor Hedge Fund Report Card.

In April 2015, Ben S. Bernanke, who was the United States Federal Reserve chairman for eight years, joined Citadel as a senior adviser on global economic and financial issues. In January 2017, Joanna Welsh became the Chief Risk Officer.

=== Funds ===
Citadel's investment fund structure consists of semi-autonomous teams that manage their own portfolios in specific market sectors.

- Wellington Fund; founded in 1990 when Citadel began operations; Citadel's flagship multi-strategy hedge fund.
- Citadel Global Equities: created in 2001, a market-neutral strategy equities fund.
- Tactical Trading: began in 2007, expanded in 2009-2010 to include statistical arbitrage and market neutral equity strategies
- Fixed Income and Macro: founded in 1999, macro and interest rate-focused fund.

== Corporate affairs ==
=== Citadel ownership ===
In November 2006, Citadel became the second hedge fund to publicly issue bonds to investors in the form of senior unsecured debt totaling $2 billion, in an arrangement managed by Lehman Brothers and Goldman Sachs.

=== Employees ===
In 2007, the fund was known for having one of the largest turnover rates in Chicago, gaining the nickname "Chicago's revolving door". The New York Times reported in 2010 that "the firm is unique in its reputation for being a revolving door", meaning that it had a high turnover rate. It is also reported that turnover is aligned with the hedge fund industry.

=== Regulatory affairs and public positions ===
Citadel has played an active role in regulatory affairs and has advocated for financial legislation on market structure. In 1999, Congress repealed a provision in the Glass–Steagall Act of 1933 that strictly separated banking and trading activities by financial firms. Griffin called dismantling that law "one of the biggest fiascos of all time". After the 2008 financial crisis, Griffin and Citadel called for greater transparency in derivatives trading, a stance at odds with many other hedge funds and major financial firms. The company spoke out against Wall Street for lobbying to delay the implementation of the Dodd–Frank Act. Griffin has also called for breaking up "too big to fail" banks and separating their banking and trading activities.

Following the 2014 publication of Flash Boys by Michael Lewis, who claimed financial markets are "rigged by large, high-speed traders" (also known as "high-frequency traders") Griffin, who was not interviewed by Lewis, shared his views on the book and its allegations during his second congressional hearing. Griffin said in front of the Senate Banking Committee that from his perspective "the U.S. equity markets are the fairest, most transparent, resilient and competitive markets in the world." Griffin expanded by saying that high-frequency trading functions to reconcile discrepancies between options tied to groups of stocks and the stocks themselves, saying, "Somebody has to keep the New York markets in line with the markets in Chicago. It all happens at an extremely low cost in the context of our capital markets". During an event at Georgetown University, Griffin called the book "fiction".

In November 2024, Griffin publicly warned against the tariff policies proposed by President-elect Donald Trump, stating at the Economic Club of New York that he was "gravely concerned that the rise of tariffs puts us on a slippery slope towards crony capitalism." Griffin argued that tariff-protected companies would lose competitive drive and turn to lobbying rather than innovation. Following the implementation of sweeping tariffs in 2025, Griffin escalated his criticism, telling the Milken Institute Global Conference in May 2025 that tariff exemptions had already "unleashed an era of crony capitalism" - happening "over the course of weeks" rather than the years he had anticipated.

== See also ==
- The Quants: How a New Breed of Math Whizzes Conquered Wall Street and Nearly Destroyed It
- Merrill Lynch, Pierce, Fenner & Smith Inc. v. Manning, a 2016 Supreme Court case involving naked short selling claims against Citadel Derivative Group and Merrill Lynch, and others.
