= EDX (cryptocurrency exchange) =

Cryptocurrency company in New Jersey, US

- Type: Private
- Founded: 2022
- Headquarters: Chicago, United States
- Key people: Tony Acuña-Rohter (CEO)
- Products: Over 90 digital asset instruments
- Website: edxmarkets.com

EDX Markets, commonly known as EDX, is an institutional cryptocurrency exchange. It offers trading, settlement and clearing services globally.

== History ==
EDX Markets was founded in 2022. Initially built on technology infrastructure powered by MEMX, the exchange began processing trades in June 2023, offering trading in Bitcoin, Ethereum, Litecoin, and Bitcoin Cash at launch.

In 2023, EDX launched EDX Clearing, a central clearinghouse for trades. The clearinghouse was designed to support improved price competition, reduced settlement risk, and greater operational efficiency.

In January 2024, EDX Markets completed its series B round of funding, led by Pantera Capital and Sequoia Capital, for an undisclosed amount. The company said it would use the funding to expand outside the United States.

In December 2024, Tony Acuña-Rohter was named chief executive officer of EDX Markets. He had previously served as the firm's chief technology officer.

In February 2026, EDX Markets launched FlowConnect, a crypto-as-a-service platform designed to help firms launch their own digital asset trading products on white-labeled EDX technology. Offerings at launch included spot trading, perpetual futures trading, clearing and stablecoin on- and off-ramp workflows.

In April 2026, EDX Markets submitted an application with the Office of the Comptroller of the Currency to become a national trust bank.
