= Knight Capital Group =

Former American financial services firm

- Type: Subsidiary
- Traded as: NYSE: KCG, until July 1, 2013
- Industry: Financial services
- Founded: 1995
- Fate: Merged with Getco LLC in 2013, forming KCG Holdings
- Headquarters: Jersey City, New Jersey, United States
- Key people: Thomas Joyce, chairman and chief executive officer
- Products: Market making and trading
- Revenue: $1.404 billion USD (2011)
- Net income: $115.2 million USD (2011)
- Number of employees: 1,418 (2012)
- Website: www.knight.com

The Knight Capital Group was an American global financial services firm engaging in market making, electronic execution, and institutional sales and trading. With its high-frequency trading algorithms Knight was the largest trader in U.S. equities, with a market share of 17.3% on NYSE and 16.9% on NASDAQ. The company agreed to be acquired by Getco LLC in December 2012 after an August 2012 trading error lost $460 million. The merger was completed in July 2013, forming KCG Holdings.

== Company ==
Knight was formerly known as Knight/Trimark Group, Inc. and Knight Trading Group, Inc. Initially, Knight Trading group had multiple offices located in the United States and in other cities around the world. Knight's Asset Management offices were headquartered in Minnetonka, Minnesota, with offices in Hong Kong, China, and London.

=== Activities ===
Knight's largest business was market making in U.S. equities. Its Electronic Trading Group (ETG) covered more than 19,000 U.S. securities with an average daily trading volume of more than 21 billion dollars in May 2012. Knight also made markets in U.S. options and European equities.

In 2002, Knight paid $1.5 million to settle regulatory charges of violations such as not respecting posted quotes. Knight neither admitted nor denied the allegations. In 2004, the company paid a $79 million settlement to customers whom they had overcharged. In 2008, Knight traded an average of 3.97 billion shares per day. In 2011, the company was worth $1.5 billion and employed approximately 1450 people. Knight had also been accused of the illegal practice of spoofing, which is a disruptive algorithmic trading activity employed by traders to outpace other market participants and to manipulate markets. Spoofers feign interest in trading futures, stocks and other products in financial markets creating an illusion of the demand and supply of the traded asset.

=== Offices ===
Knight was headquartered in Jersey City, New Jersey. It had many offices in other US locations, as well as in the UK, Germany, Switzerland, China, and Singapore.

=== Operating subsidiaries ===
Knight Capital Group operated in four segments: equities, fixed income, currencies and commodities, and corporate. Operating business subsidiaries included Knight Capital Americas, L.P., Knight Execution & Clearing Services LLC, Knight Capital Europe Limited and Hotspot FX Holdings, Inc. Knight Capital Group discontinued operations of its asset management segment in 2009 when its subsidiary, Deephaven Capital Management, sold most of its assets to Stark & Roth, LLC.

== 2012 stock trading disruption ==
On August 1, 2012, Knight Capital caused a major stock market disruption leading to a large trading loss for the company. The incident happened after a technician forgot to copy the new Retail Liquidity Program (RLP) code to one of the eight SMARS computer servers, which was Knight's automated routing system for equity orders. RLP code repurposed a flag that was formerly used to activate an old function known as 'Power Peg'. Orders sent with the repurposed flag to the eighth server triggered the defective Power Peg code still present on that server. This function executed blocks of a stock trade, halting when it recorded that enough orders were fulfilled. However, the code to report back the fulfillment of orders had been altered after the deprecation of "Power Peg", resulting in the order never being recorded as completed. As a result, the server would send out orders indefinitely.

When released into production, Knight's trading activities caused a major disruption in the prices of 148 companies listed at the New York Stock Exchange. For example, shares of Wizzard Software Corporation went from $3.50 to $14.76. For the 212 incoming parent orders that were processed by the defective Power Peg code, Knight Capital sent millions of child orders, resulting in 4 million executions in 154 stocks for more than 397 million shares in approximately 45 minutes.

Knight Capital took a pre-tax loss of $440 million. This caused Knight Capital's stock price to collapse, sending shares lower by over 70% from before the announcement. The nature of the Knight Capital's unusual trading activity was described as a "technology breakdown".

On August 5, the company raised around $400 million from half a dozen investors led by Jefferies in an attempt to stay in business after the trading error. Jefferies CEO Richard Handler and Executive Committee Chair Brian Friedman structured and led the rescue and Jefferies purchased $125 million of the $400 million investment and became Knight's largest shareholder. The financing would be in the form of convertible securities, bonds that turn into equity in the company at a fixed price in the future.

The incident was embarrassing for Knight CEO Thomas Joyce, who was an outspoken critic of Nasdaq's handling of Facebook's IPO. On the same day the company's stock plunged 33 percent, to $3.39; by the next day 75 percent of Knight's equity value had been erased.

== See also ==
- Dark pool
- Market maker
