= Alan Cohen =

American ice hockey executive

Alan Phillip Cohen
- Born: October 5, 1954 (age 72)
- Education: University of Florida
- Occupation: Business executive
- Known for: Majority owner of the Florida Panthers, Founder/CEO of Andrx Pharmaceuticals Inc.
- Spouse: Karen Cohen

Alan Phillip Cohen (born October 5, 1954) is an American businessman, best known for his ownership of the Florida Panthers hockey team and his founding of several generic pharmaceutical companies, most notably the Davie, Florida-based Andrx Corp. Cohen.

== Biography ==
In 1984, he founded the drug distribution firm Best Generics Inc. and sold it to Florida's Ivax Corporation in 1988 for $10 million although he stayed on as President until 1990. In 1992, he founded Andrx Pharmaceuticals Inc., which he led as CEO to its inclusion in the Nasdaq100 in 1999. In 1996, the company went public at $12 and its stock eventually soared as high as $400 a share split adjusted. In October 2000, he left the company to purchase the Florida Panthers. In 2002, he created Abrika Pharmaceuticals Inc. in Sunrise, Florida. Four years later, he sold it for $235 million to Actavis Group, an international generic drug company in Iceland.

=== Florida Panthers ===
He was the majority owner of the NHL's Florida Panthers from 2001 to 2009.

=== Horse racing and breeding ===
Since 2003, he has been racing and breeding horses on his Arindel Farm in Ocala, Florida. One of his horses, Wait A While, competed in a Breeder's Cup race at Churchill Downs in 2006. She went on to become United States Champion 3 year old filly in 2006.

== Personal life ==
He and his wife, Karen, live in Weston, Florida. He is of Jewish descent.

Sporting positions
Preceded by Wayne Huizenga	Florida Panthers owner 2001–2013	Succeeded by Vincent Viola
