= Eckerson =

Eckerson is a surname. Notable people with the surname include:

- Clarence Eckerson (born 1967), American videographer
- Sophia Eckerson (c. 1880–1954), American botanist and microchemist

== See also ==
- Eckerson House
