= Headlands Technologies =

Proprietary trading firm

Headlands Technologies LLC
- Type: Private
- Industry: Financial services
- Founded: July 2009; 17 years ago
- Founders: Matthew Andresen; Jason Lehman; Neil Fitzpatrick
- Headquarters: Chicago, Illinois, U.S.
- Key people: Matthew Andresen (CEO)
- Products: Proprietary trading Algorithmic trading High-frequency trading
- Website: headlandstech.com

Headlands Technologies (Headlands) is an American quantitative proprietary trading firm headquartered in Chicago. It has additional offices in New York, Austin, Amsterdam, and Singapore.

== History ==
=== Founding and early operations (2009-2012) ===
Headlands was founded in July 2009 by three former senior executives from the trading side of Citadel Group. Matt Andresen was a former co-chief executive at Citadel Securities. At the same time, Jason Lehman was head of Citadel's global options business, and Neil Fitzpatrick was chief operating officer of Citadel Execution Services. The partners secured outside funding to start the firm and set up its quantitative trading operation to trade equities, options, and futures. The trading would be computer-driven, and the firm would not run outside money. At the start, the firm had ten employees.

=== Expansion into fixed income trading (2013-2020) ===
In 2013, Headlands founded Headlands Tech Global Markets LLC to expand into electronic fixed-income trading.

In 2014, it started trading municipal bonds and focused mostly on lots of $100,000 or less. In 2019, it was reported to execute more than 1,000 trades daily and had an inventory of $400 million. Its technology could generate prices on more than 700,000 bonds.

=== Recent developments (2021-present) ===
In March 2021, Toronto-Dominion Bank agreed to buy Headlands Tech Global Markets LLC from Headlands to improve its automated fixed-income trading platform. The deal was completed in July 2021.

Following the divestiture of its fixed income business in 2021, Headlands Technologies continued to operate as a quantitative proprietary trading firm. Bloomberg described its fixed income business as providing "fully automated market-making services" prior to its acquisition by Toronto-Dominion Bank, and the firm has continued to trade equities, options, and future markets using automated systems.

In 2022, Headlands leased approximately 35,000 square feet at 110 North Wacker Drive in Chicago, nearly tripling its office footprint. Company executives cited continued hiring and long-term growth plans despite broader uncertainty in office leasing market.

== Legal proceedings ==
In January 2025, United States prosecutors alleged that the former trader Richard Ho had stolen intellectual property trade secrets from Headlands. Headlands alleged that Ho had colluded with Tower Research Capital.

== See also ==
- Sergey Aleynikov
- Michael Lewis’ book Flash Boys
