= List of people from Markham, Ontario =

This is a list of notable people who are from Markham, Ontario, Canada, or have spent a large part or formative part of their careers and/or lives in that city.

== B ==
- Corie Beveridge, curler
- Joseph Blandisi, NHL player for the Pittsburgh Penguins
- Paula Brancati, actress
- Major John Button, Upper Canada settler, soldier
- Steve Byers, actor

== C ==
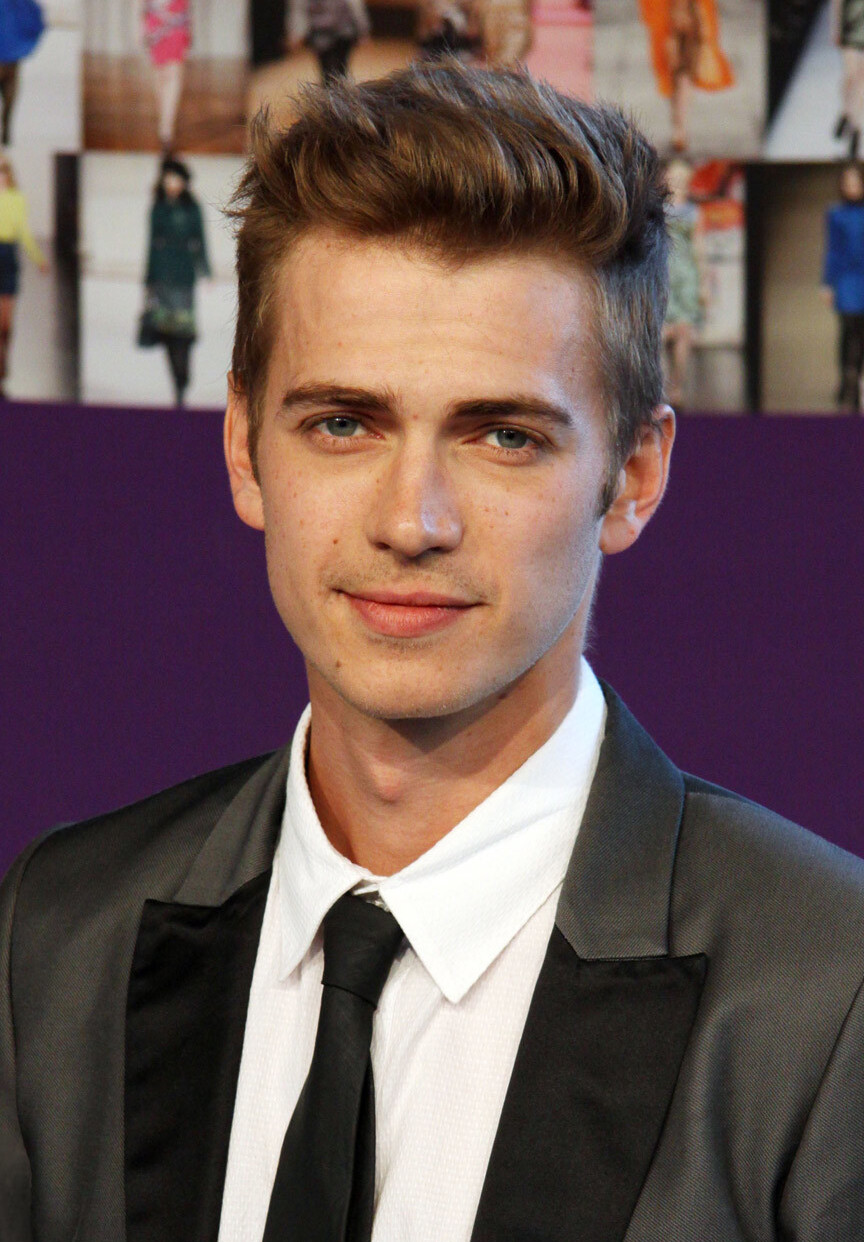
Hayden Christensen

- Paul Calandra, former Conservative MP and current Ontario PC Party MPP
- Emmanuelle Chriqui, actress
- Hayden Christensen (b. 1981), actor
- Matt Coates, Canadian football player
- Don Cousens (1938-2017), MPP, and Mayor of Markham
- Joseph Cramarossa, professional hockey player for Stockton Heat
- Bill Crothers, track and field athlete, Olympic silver medalist, 1964
- Ayesha Curry, actress and chef

== D ==
- Andre De Grasse, track and field athlete
- Michael Del Zotto, former NHL player

== E ==
- William Eakin (1828–1918), Northwest Territories MLA and Speaker

== F ==
- Warren Foegele (b. 1996), NHL hockey player for the Los Angeles Kings
- Mariah Fujimagari (b. 1994), NWHL hockey player for the Buffalo Beauts

== G ==
- Brendan Gaunce, NHL hockey player for the Vancouver Canucks
- Cameron Gaunce, NHL hockey player for the Columbus Blue Jackets
- Kim Gellard, curler
- Phylicia George, Canadian sprinter/hurdler
- Niko Giantsopoulos (b. 1994), soccer player
- Zachary Gingras, Paralympic Athlete - Athletics
- Adam Gontier (b. 1978), former lead singer of Three Days Grace; current lead singer of Saint Asonia

== H ==
- Ben Heppner, CC (b. 1956), Canadian dramatic tenor
- Karl Brooks Heisey, Canadian mining engineer and executive
- Jason Ho-shue, badminton player
- Cody Hodgson, former NHL player

== J ==
- Ben Johnson, former Canadian sprinter

== K ==
- Logan Kanapathi, MPP
- Brad Katsuyama, founder of Investors Exchange
- Aramis Kouzine (b. 1998), soccer player

== L ==
- Stefan Lamanna (b. 1995), soccer player
- Victor Lai, badminton player
- Mathieu Laurent (b. 1996), soccer player
- Michelle Li, badminton player, 4-time Olympian
- Jack Mingjie Lin (b. 1999), tennis player

== M ==
- Mitch Marner, NHL hockey player for the Vegas Golden Knights
- Mena Massoud, actor
- Brad May, retired NHL hockey player
- Benjamin Milliken II, Major York Militia, 1837 Upper Canada Rebellion
- Dominic Moore, retired NHL hockey player
- Norman Milliken, lumber mill and tavern owner
- Aviva Mongillo (b. 1998, Carys), actress and singer

== O ==
- Anna-Marie Ondaatje (b. 2000), rhythmic gymnast

== P ==
- Jennifer Pan, convicted of conspiring to kill her mother as well as attempting to kill her father
- Ken Pereira, field hockey player, Pan American Games medalist
- Justin Peroff, drummer for the band Broken Social Scene
- Jordanna Phillips (b. 1990), soccer player
- Connor Price, actor

== R ==
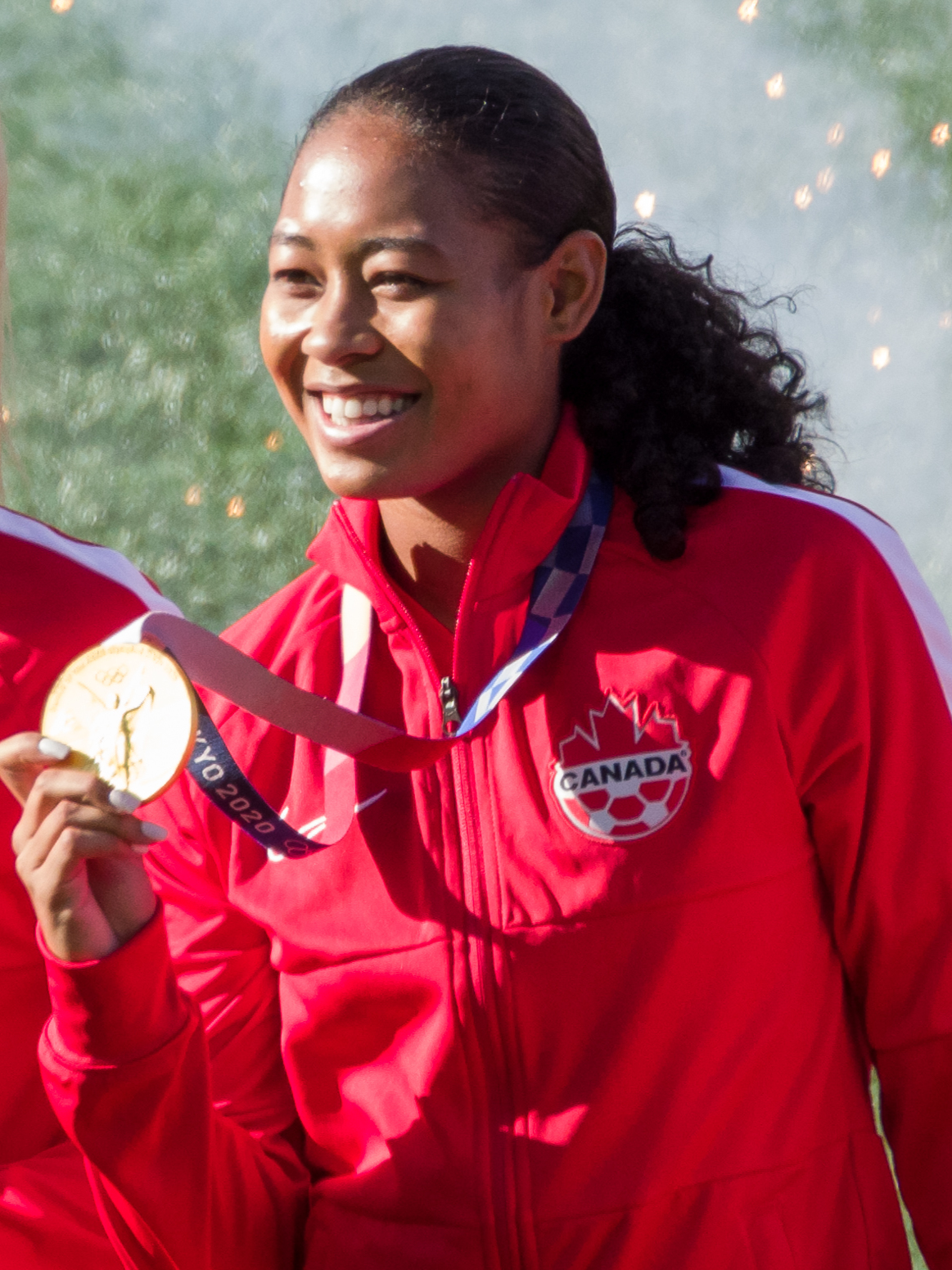
- Jayde Riviere
  David Reesor, Canadian Senator and Reeve of Markham Village
- Peter Reesor, lumber mill owner, founder of Markham
- Christopher Richards, actor
- Jayde Riviere, 2021 Olympic gold medalist, professional soccer player for Canada and WSL's Manchester United
- Albert John Robertson, Canadian politician; first Leader of the Opposition in the Legislative Assembly of Alberta, 1905–1909
- Lloyd Robertson, OC, news broadcaster
- Shauna Robertson, actress
- Jordan Romano (b. 1993), MLB pitcher for the Colorado Rockies
- Jade Rose, soccer player for Canada
- Lucas Rumball (b. 1995), rugby union player
- Anna Russell, singer and opera parodist
- Trey Rutherford (b. 1995), football player

== S ==
- Lilly Singh (also known as IISuperwomanII), talk show host
- Jeff Skinner, NHL hockey player for the San Jose Sharks
- Celine Song (b. 1988), playwright and filmmaker
- Steven Stamkos, NHL hockey player for the Nashville Predators
- Courtenay Stewart, Canadian synchronized swimmer
- Marlene Stewart Streit, OC, golfer
- Tammy Sutton-Brown, WNBA basketball player

== T ==
- Brittney Tam (b. 1997), badminton player
- Steve Thomas, retired NHL hockey player
- Cliff Thorburn (b. 1948), retired professional snooker player
- Jonah Tong, MLB pitcher for the New York Mets
- Michelle Tong (b. 1997), badminton player
- Raffi Torres, retired NHL hockey player

== U ==
- Luca Uccello, soccer player

== V ==
- Iman Vellani (b. 2002), actress

== W ==
- Chris Wardman, founding member and guitarist of Blue Peter
- Justyn Warner, Canadian sprinter
- Stephen Weiss, retired NHL hockey player
- Sarah Wells, track and field athlete
- Ethan Werek, professional ice hockey player, currently playing for the Belleville Senators
- Breanne Wilson-Bennett (b. 1996), NWHL ice hockey player

== Z ==
- Shivon Zilis (b. 1986), AI venture capitalist
