= THOR (trading platform) =

Electronic trading platform

The Tactical Hybrid Order Router (THOR) is an electronic trading platform designed to manage securities orders while avoiding certain tactics used by high-frequency trading. Allen Zhang developed the program while working at the Royal Bank of Canada as part of a team led by Brad Katsuyama.

== Trading process ==
Katsuyama noticed that placing a single large order that can be fulfilled only through many different stock exchanges was being taken as an advantage by stock scalpers. Scalpers, noticing the order would not be able to be fulfilled by one single exchange, would instead buy the securities in the other exchanges, so that by the time the rest of the large order arrived to those exchanges the scalpers could sell the securities at a higher price. High-frequency trading (HFT) are large market players that invest their money using advanced algorithms, in this case, to exploit the microsecond differences in arrival times across exchanges whenever others try to send all their sub-orders simultaneously. Katsuyama created THOR to route orders in a way that could not be influenced by HFT. THOR delays each sub-order differently so that they arrive simultaneously at all exchanges.

Scalping done on large orders by high-frequency trading systems.

Use of intentional delays by several trading platforms such as THOR.

== See also ==
- Millennium Exchange
