= Brad Katsuyama =

Canadian financial services executive (born 1978)

- Born: Bradley Toshio Katsuyama; 1978 (age 47–48); Markham, Ontario, Canada
- Education: Wilfrid Laurier University
- Occupation: Business executive
- Organization: IEX
- Board member of: IEX

Bradley Toshio Katsuyama (born 1978) is a Canadian financial services executive. He is the CEO and co-founder of the Investors Exchange (IEX). He left the Royal Bank of Canada (RBC) in 2012 to co-found IEX under the premise that it would be a fairer stock trading venue than other exchanges.

Through his work with IEX, Katsuyama is featured in Flash Boys, a 2014 non-fiction book by Michael Lewis about high-frequency trading (HFT) in the financial markets.

== Early life and education ==
Born in 1978, Katsuyama is a native of Markham, Ontario, Canada. In 2001, he earned a Bachelor of Business Administration from the Wilfrid Laurier University in Waterloo, Ontario.

== Career ==
=== RBC and pre-IEX career ===
Before founding IEX, Katsuyama worked for many years at the RBC. He held management roles in US cash equity trading, hedge fund coverage and US technology trading. Later he became the global head of electronic sales and trading, overseeing electronic sales, electronic trading, algorithmic trading, market structure strategy, client implementation and product management.

=== HFT problems, discovery and response ===
While at RBC, he noticed that placing a single large order that can be fulfilled only through many different stock exchanges was being taken advantage of by stock scalpers. Scalpers, noticing the order would not be able to be fulfilled by one single exchange, would instead buy the securities on the other exchanges, so that by the time the rest of the large order arrived to those exchanges the scalpers could sell the securities at a higher price. All these events would happen in milliseconds not perceivable to humans but perceivable to computers. Katsuyama led a team that implemented THOR, a securities' order-management system where large orders are split into many different sub-orders with each sub-order arriving at the same time to all the exchanges through the use of intentional delays.

=== Post-RBC and IEX founding ===
Katsuyama left RBC in 2012 to start what he considered to be a fairer stock trading venue, the IEX. IEX is an emerging stock exchange, organized as an alternative trading system, also known as a dark pool; company representatives have stated their intention to convert to a public exchange upon reaching sufficient trading volume. It opened for its first day of trading on October 25, 2013. William O'Brien, at the time president of competing business BATS Global Markets, during a debate on CNBC, asserted in April 2014 the IEX was trying to build its business by generating "fear", "mistrust" and "accusations".

Katsuyama and his work at IEX is featured in Flash Boys, a 2014 non-fiction book by financial writer Michael Lewis about high-frequency trading (HFT) in the financial markets. Lewis praised IEX as an appropriate and beneficial response to HFT abuses. Since the publishing of Flash Boys and the opening of IEX, several U.S. authorities have confirmed they are looking into certain practices used by high-frequency traders. The FBI, the U.S. Securities and Exchange Commission, the U.S. Justice Department and the Attorney General of New York State all have investigations underway.

Scalping done on large orders by high-frequency trading systems.

Intentional delays implemented by Katsuyama and his team to ensure simultaneous order arrival.

=== IEX approvals ===
The SEC approved the IEX to be an official exchange on June 17, 2016, with Katsuyama remaining IEX CEO. On October 24, 2017, IEX Group Inc. received regulatory approval from the SEC to list companies. IEX said it would begin listings in early 2018, with a focus on getting companies to switch over from other stock exchanges, by undercutting listing fees of rivals. Katsuyama remains chairman of the IEX board.

== Personal life ==
Katsuyama lives in Darien, CT with his wife and two sons.

== See also ==
- List of people from Markham, Ontario
