= Ronan Ryan =

Irish-American businessperson (born 1974)

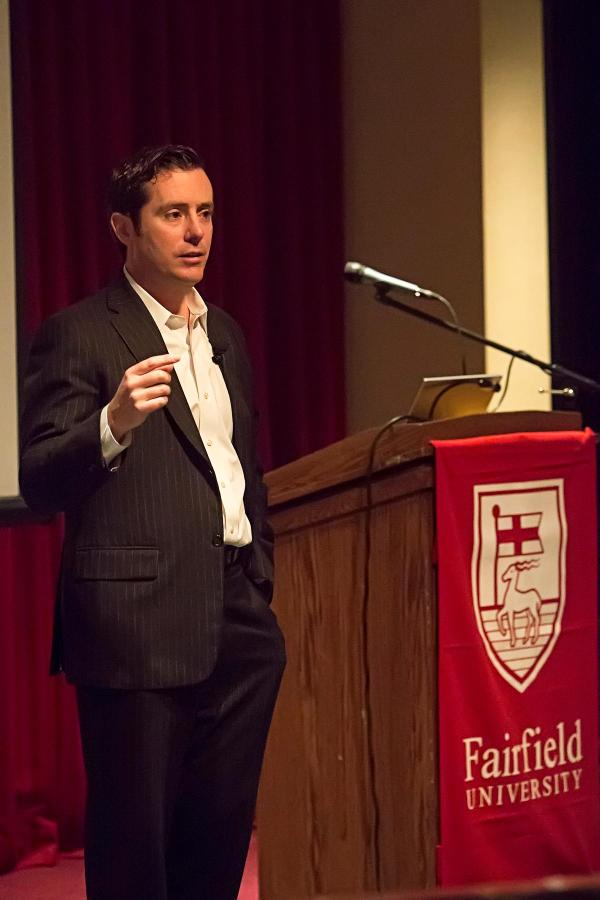
- Born: June 17, 1974 (age 52); Dublin, Ireland
- Citizenship: United States, Ireland
- Education: Fairfield University (BA)
- Known for: Michael Lewis' Flash Boys
- Title: President of IEX Group
- Website: www.iextrading.com

Ronan Ryan is an Irish-American businessperson. He is the president of IEX, the Investor's Exchange, and an electronic trading expert. As a founding member of IEX, Ryan was a central character featured in Michael Lewis’ Flash Boys: A Wall Street Revolt. Irish America magazine named Ryan to its 2014 and 2015 Wall Street 50 list.

== Background ==
Born and raised in Dublin, he moved to America in 1990, when he was 16.

Ryan has extensive experience in both networking infrastructure and the financial services industry. Prior to the IEX Group, he has worked for RBC Capital Markets, Switch and Data, BT Radianz, Qwest and MCI.

== Education ==
Ryan graduated from Fairfield University in 1996 with a Bachelor's degree in International Studies. During his time at Fairfield, Ryan was a member of the cross country team and he was the school mascot, Lucas the Stag.

== Flash Boys ==
Since Michael Lewis' book Flash Boys: A Wall Street Revolt was released in March 2014, Ryan has experienced rising popularity. As a networking infrastructure expert, Ryan shared his knowledge of colocation and high-frequency trading with Lewis, which became a large focus of Flash Boys.
