= United States v. Agrawal =

American legal case

- Court: United States Court of Appeals for the Second Circuit
- Full case name: United States of America v. Samarth Agrawal
- Argued: June 21st, 2012
- Decided: August 1st, 2013

Court membership
- Judges sitting: Rosemary S. Pooler, Reena Raggi, and Gerard E. Lynch

Keywords
- Economic Espionage Act, Intellectual Property, Quantitative Trading, Trade Secret

United States v. Agrawal, 726 F.3d 235 (2nd Cir. 2013), was a case heard in the United States Court of Appeals for the Second Circuit involving theft of trade secrets and intellectual property. The court upheld the conviction of Samarth Agrawal, former quantitative analyst at Paris-based bank Société Générale S.A ("SocGen"), for stealing high-frequency trading code from SocGen and replicating proprietary software for New York-based hedge fund Tower Research Capital ("Tower").

The decision of this case has been compared with United States v. Aleynikov, where Sergey Aleynikov was convicted and later acquitted for stealing proprietary code from Goldman Sachs in a similar fashion just over a year earlier. Despite similarities between Aleynikov and Agrawal, The Second Circuit drew opposite conclusions for the two cases. The district court's decision in Agrawal was upheld based on details regarding the medium in which the code was stolen, as well as the way the district courts initially presented the cases to the jury.

== Background ==
Agrawal was a quantitative analyst working at SocGen's High Frequency Trading ("HFT") Group in New York. He was hired in 2007, but only given direct access to the company's HFT software in 2009. Unbeknownst to SocGen, Agrawal began pursuing job opportunities with other institutions shortly after his promotion. During his meeting with representatives from Tower, Agrawal shared his knowledge about SocGen's quantitative trading systems "DQS" and "ADP", and was subsequently hired by Tower, with the belief that Agrawal would have the ability to develop similar HFT systems for the company. Agrawal formally accepted his employment offer from Tower in August, 2009, but continued to work at SocGen without disclosing such information until November, 2009. During these three months, Agrawal remained in frequent contact with representatives from Tower, and had transported physical copies of SocGen's DQS code from his office in New York to his home in New Jersey. Agrawal resigned from SocGen on November 17, 2009, triggering a leave period during which he continued to receive compensation from SocGen, but was prohibited from working for SocGen's competitors. During these months, Agrawal continued to meet with and provide Tower personnel with information on SocGen's two HFT systems. Agrawal was caught when surveillance cameras recorded him printing out hundreds of pages of code and putting the print outs in his backpack. He was arrested at his apartment on April 19, 2010, the day he was set to begin work at Tower.

== Initial trial ==
At the initial trial, Agrawal admitted to sharing information about SocGen's trading software with Tower and did not dispute the factual evidences against him. On May 13, 2010, Agrawal was charged by a district jury in a two-count indictment with violations of the Economic Espionage Act (EEA) and the National Stolen Property Act (NSPA). Agrawal violated the EEA by printing out SocGen's proprietary HFT computer code with intent of using such trade secrets for his own economic benefits. With respect to the NSPA, Agrawal "unlawfully, willingly, and knowingly" engaged in the interstate transportation of stolen goods by removing the HFT code from SocGen's New York offices, and taking them to his home in New Jersey. Agrawal was sentenced to three years in prison by the district court before requesting for appeal.

== Opinion of the Court (2nd Circuit Appeal) ==
The district court's opinion was affirmed by Judge Raggi and Judge Lynch of the Second Circuit Court of Appeals. Judge Pooler concurred in part, and dissented in a separate opinion with regards to the EEA. Charges against Agrawal for the EEA and the NSPA were addressed separately in the ruling, and for both indictments, rulings from United States v. Aleynikov were cited intensively.

=== Economic Espionage Act ===
At the time of Agrawal's indictment and conviction, anyone who knowingly steals, receives or duplicates proprietary information with the intent of converting such trade secrets to the economic benefit of anyone other than the original owners may be guilty of crime. The EEA also specified that the stolen trade secrets must be related to a product that is produced for interstate commerce, a key point of contention in United States v. Aleynikov, where the Second Circuit reversed the district court's decision and acquitted Aleynikov from EEA conviction.

Agrawal cited Aleynikov and argued that the HFT code stolen from SocGen was no more intended to enter or pass in commerce as Aleynikov's stolen code from Goldman Sachs was. Since SocGen's HFT code were not placed in "interstate commerce", Agrawal argued that he should not be convicted of crime under the EEA. The Second Circuit responded by pointing out a distinction between the two cases regarding the way the EEA charge was submitted to the initial jury. In the case with Aleynikov, Goldman Sach's proprietary computer code was presented to the jury by the district court as a "single product". In the case with Agrawal, the district court argued that the securities traded by SocGen, rather than the HFT code itself, were the actual products engaged in interstate commerce. Since SocGen's HFT code were "related" to such securities, Agrawal's legal sufficiency challenge to the EEA was rejected.

=== National Stolen Property Act ===
Under NSPA, anyone who engages in interstate or foreign commerce of stolen goods of the value of $5,000 or more may be guilty of crime. However, theft of "purely intangible properties in a purely intangible format" does not state an offense under NSPA. Agrawal challenged the NSPA by making the same argument as Aleynikov, stating that source code should not be considered as a form of tangible good. The 2nd Circuit noted that, in contrast to Aleynikov who uploaded stolen code to a server before downloading it to his personal computer, Agrawal printed out physical copies of SocGen's code on thousands of sheets of paper. The court argued that Aleynikov never assumed "physical control" over anything tangible by transferring code electronically, while Agrawal did assume control over tangible goods. NSPA was applicable whenever tangible items were stolen, however insignificant or valueless the item may be absent the intangible component. As a result, the 2nd Circuit rejected Agrawal's challenge against his NSPA charges, citing "a lack of any error" in the district court's ruling.

== Significance of ruling ==
The Second Circuit's ruling was received with surprise, as seemingly identical cases between Aleynikov and Agrawal resulted in opposite conclusions. In both cases, defendants were indicted of EEA and NSPA for stealing proprietary computer code from the financial institutions where they worked. After appealing to the Second Circuit, Aleynikov was acquitted while Agrawal stood convicted of both NSPA and EEA charges. Results were significant in understanding The Second Circuit's emphasis on detail. In regards to NSPA, Agrawal was convicted because he printed out physical copies of proprietary code rather than having downloaded it. Similarly, Agrawal's conviction under the EEA was upheld because the district court presented the case in a clear manner that allowed Agrawal to be convicted under the EEA. Judge Pooler noted in her dissent from the majority's opinion on Agrawal's EEA conviction that both cases had nearly identical fact patterns with identical laws applied.

== See also ==
- United States v. Aleynikov
