= Arista Records LLC v. Lime Group LLC =

2010 United States district court case

- Court: United States District Court for the Southern District of New York
- Full case name: Arista Records LLC et al. v. Lime Group LLC et al.
- Decided: 11 May 2010 amended on 25 May 2010
- Docket nos.: 1:06-cv-05936
- Citation: 715 F. Supp. 2d 481

Case history
- Subsequent action: Permanent injunction

Holding
- Summary judgment granted for inducement of copyright infringement

Court membership
- Judge sitting: Kimba Wood

Arista Records LLC v. Lime Group LLC, 715 F. Supp. 2d 481 (S.D.N.Y. 2010), is a United States district court case in which the Southern District of New York held that Lime Group LLC, the defendant, induced copyright infringement with its peer-to-peer file sharing software, LimeWire. The court issued a permanent injunction to shut it down. The lawsuit is a part of a larger campaign against piracy by the Recording Industry Association of America (RIAA).

== Background ==
LimeWire LLC was founded in June 2000 and released its software program, LimeWire, the following August. LimeWire was widely used; in 2006, when the lawsuit was filed, it had almost 4 million users per day.

LimeWire is a program that uses peer-to-peer (P2P) file sharing technology, which permits users to share digital files via an Internet-based network known as Gnutella; most of these were MP3 files containing copyrighted audio recordings. An expert report presented during the trial found, in a random sample of files available on LimeWire, that 93% were protected by copyright. These files were distributed, published, and copied by LimeWire users without authorization from the copyright owners, potentially competing with the recording companies' own sale of the music.

Thirteen major recording companies led by Arista Records (Note: The thirteen consisted of Arista Records LLC (Sony BMG/Sony Music), Atlantic Recording Corporation (Warner Music Group), BMG Music, Capitol Records Inc. (EMI), Elektra Entertainment Group Inc. (Warner Music Group), Interscope Records (Universal Music Group), LaFace Records LLC (Sony BMG/Sony Music), Motown Record Company, L.P. (Universal Music Group), Priority Records LLC (EMI), Sony BMG Music Entertainment, UMG Recordings Inc., Virgin Records America Inc. (EMI), and Warner Bros. Records Inc. (Warner Music Group)) (when sued owned by Sony BMG, now by Sony Music) sued LimeWire LLC, Lime Group LLC, Mark Gorton, Greg Bildson, and M.J.G. LimeWire Family Limited Partnership for copyright infringement. LimeWire filed antitrust counterclaims against the plaintiffs and ancillary counterclaims for conspiracy in restraint of trade, deceptive trade practices, and tortious interference with prospective business relations, all dismissed by the court in 2007.

The recording companies alleged that the software is used to obtain and share unauthorized copies, and that LimeWire facilitated this copyright infringement by distributing and maintaining the software. They claimed that LimeWire was liable for:

1. inducement of copyright infringement
2. contributory copyright infringement
3. vicarious copyright infringement
4. violations of state common law prohibiting copyright infringement and unfair competition

== Opinion of the court ==
On 11 May 2010, Judge Kimba Wood granted the RIAA's motion for summary judgment, finding LimeWire liable for inducement of copyright infringement, common law copyright infringement and unfair competition as to the plaintiffs' pre-1978 copyrighted works. The court amended its opinion and court order on 25 May 2010.

Because all persons and corporations who participate in, exercise control over or benefit from an infringement are jointly and severally liable as copyright infringers, all claims of copyright infringement were equally applicable against Lime Group LLC and Mark Gorton, as sole executive director. The claims against Bildson, a former employee, were dropped in exchange for providing factual information about LimeWire and payment of a settlement. The court did not settle the fraudulent conveyance claim against M.J.G. LimeWire Family Limited Partnership under summary judgment, due to a genuine issue of fact.

=== Secondary liability ===
The RIAA based their infringement claims on theories of secondary liability, which may be imposed on a party that has not directly infringed a copyright, but has nonetheless played a significant role. A party that distributes infringement-enabling products or services may facilitate direct infringement on a massive scale, making effective enforcement for the copyright owner illusory.

The court established the prerequisite of direct infringement, supported by expert testimony which estimated that 98.8% of the files requested for download through LimeWire were copyright-protected and not authorized for free distribution.

==== Inducement ====
To establish a claim for inducement, the RIAA had to show that LimeWire, by distributing and maintaining LimeWire, engaged in purposeful conduct that encouraged copyright infringement with intent to do so. Applying the inducement doctrine as announced by the Supreme Court in 2005 in MGM Studios, Inc. v. Grokster, Ltd., the court found overwhelming evidence of LimeWire's purposeful conduct fostered infringement. It established intent to encourage infringement by distributing LimeWire through the following factors:

1. LimeWire's awareness of substantial infringement by users;
2. its efforts to attract infringing users;
3. its efforts to enable and assist users to commit infringement;
4. its dependence on infringing use for the success of its business; and
5. its failure to mitigate infringing activities.

The court said that LimeWire's electronic notice asking users to affirm that they were not using it for copyright infringement, did not constitute any meaningful effort to mitigate infringement. In 2006, LimeWire had implemented an optional hash-based filter capable of identifying a digital file with copyrighted content and blocking a user from downloading the file, but the court did not consider this a sufficient barrier. It found inducement, noting that failure to utilize existing technology to create meaningful barriers against infringement is a strong indicator of intent.

==== Contributory copyright infringement ====
The parties also cross-moved for summary judgment on the claim that LimeWire was secondarily liable for contributory copyright infringement because it materially contributed to the infringement committed by users. Unlike an inducement claim, a claim for contributory infringement does not require a show of intent, rather it must show that the defendant 1) had actual or constructive knowledge of the activity, and 2) encouraged or assisted others' infringement or provided machinery or goods that facilitated infringement. A joint amicus curiae brief was submitted by the Electronic Frontier Foundation and a coalition of consumers and industry (Note: The Electronic Frontier Foundation was joined on the amicus curiae brief by the Center for Democracy and Technology, the Computer and Communications Industry Association, the Consumer Electronics Association, the Home Recording Rights Coalition, the Information Technology Association of America, Public Knowledge, the Special Libraries Association, and the U.S. Internet Industry Association.) urging the court to apply the law in a manner that would not chill technological innovation. In particular, the brief urged the court to preserve the "Sony Betamax" doctrine developed in Sony Corp. of America v. Universal City Studios, Inc., which protects developers of technologies capable of substantial noninfringing uses from contributory infringement liability. The court declined to rule on this point of law because the case lacked enough facts to determine whether or not the software was actually capable of substantial noninfringing uses.

==== Vicarious copyright infringement ====
LimeWire also moved for summary judgment on the claim that it was vicariously liable for copyright infringement. Vicarious liability occurs when a defendant profits from direct infringement, yet declines to stop it. The court found substantial evidence that LimeWire had the right and ability to limit the use of its product for infringing purposes, including by implementing filtering, denying access, and by supervising and regulating users, none of which were exercised. Furthermore, the court found that LimeWire possessed a direct financial interest in the infringing activity, that its revenue was based on advertising and increased sales of LimeWire Pro, both consequences of its ability to attract infringing users. The court denied LimeWire's motion.

=== Common law copyright infringement and unfair competition ===
The parties cross-moved for summary judgment on the claim of common law copyright infringement and unfair competition. The claim was included because federal copyright law does not cover sound recordings made prior to 1972. The elements for finding inducement for copyright infringement are, as under federal law: direct infringement, purposeful conduct, and intent. The court found these established on the previously introduced evidence and granted summary judgment to the RIAA. The unfair competition claim was also granted because they had had to compete with LimeWire's free and unauthorized reproduction and distribution of plaintiffs' copyrighted recordings.

=== Evidentiary motions ===
LimeWire filed a number of motions challenging the admissibility of evidence submitted by the RIAA. (Note: Motions included objections as to the reliability of one expert opinion, the properness of another, failure to identify individuals as witnesses, exclusion as to exhibits purportedly relating to settlement negotiations, exclusion of evidence of conduct outside of limitation period, strikes as to a declaration from a former LimeWire employee, and objections based on relevance, authentication and hearsay.) The court found all the evidentiary objections without merit and denied the motions; it did place certain conditions on plaintiffs' future interaction with a specific former LimeWire employee.

== Subsequent developments ==
=== Permanent injunction ===
As the litigation continued, the parties consented to a permanent injunction on 26 October 2010 shutting down the LimeWire file-sharing service. The permanent injunction prohibits LimeWire from copying, reproducing, downloading, or distributing a sound recording, as well as directly or indirectly enabling or assisting any user to use the LimeWire system to copy, reproduce or distribute any sound recording, or make available any of the copyrighted works. LimeWire was also required to disable the file trading and distribution functionality for current and legacy users, to provide all users with a tool to uninstall the software, to obtain permission from the plaintiffs before offering any new version of the software, to implement a copyrighted content filter in any new versions developed, and to encourage all legacy users to upgrade if a new version was approved. The court order also required that if LimeWire sells or licenses any of its assets, as a condition of the transfer, it must require the purchaser or licensee to submit to the court's jurisdiction and agree to be bound by the permanent injunction.

Following the permanent injunction, the website www.limewire.com was effectively shut down and displays a notice to that effect. LimeWire also shut down its online store.

Soon after the injunction was ordered, a report appeared on TorrentFreak about the availability of LimeWire Pirate Edition (LPE), a new, improved LimeWire client released by "a secret dev team." The RIAA quickly complained to the judge that LimeWire was not complying with the injunction, and alleged that the LPE developer was a current or former LimeWire employee. The court ordered the LPE website shut down and allowed limited discovery to obtain the identity of the primary developer. LimeWire denied affiliation with the developer, who likewise denied being affiliated with Lime Wire LLC. The developer, who initially said his motivation was for working on the software was "to make RIAA lawyers cry into their breakfast cereal," voluntarily shuttered the LPE website rather than lose anonymity by contesting the court order.

=== Limitations on damages ===
The court maintained jurisdiction in order to provide a final ruling on LimeWire's liability and damages to determine the appropriate level necessary to compensate the record companies.

Citing a hypothetical argument from Nimmer on Copyright and the U.S. Supreme Court case Feltner v. Columbia Pictures Television, Inc., the plaintiffs proposed one award for each infringement by individual LimeWire users. The plaintiffs estimated, using a consultant's statistical analysis, that there were more than 500 million downloads of post-1972 works using the LimeWire system; however, they offered no suggestions on how to determine a precise number of direct infringers of each work.

The defendants cited McClatchey v. The Associated Press and related case law which rejected the Feltner precedent and the Nimmer hypothetical for situations involving statutory damages for infringement committed on a massive scale. In their pleadings, the defendants pointed out that the 500 million direct infringements estimated by the plaintiffs could lead to a maximum damage award of $75 trillion ($75,000,000,000,000).

On 11 March 2011, the court ruled that McClatchey and related case law did indeed trump Feltner and the Nimmer hypothetical, and held that the per-infringement proposal produces "an absurd result" potentially in the "trillions" of dollars, given the large number of uploads and downloads by LimeWire users over a period of several years. The court noted that despite its claims to the contrary, the RIAA hadn't ever argued for a per-infringement award until this case, and even then not until September 2010, more than three years after filing the lawsuit. The court added that the plaintiffs were "suggesting an award that is more money than the entire music recording industry has made since Edison's invention of the phonograph in 1877."

Accordingly, the court ruled that the labels were entitled to an award only on a per-work, rather than per-infringement basis, limiting the award to between $7.5 million and $1.5 billion of statutory damages. The court calculated the damages at $750 to $150,000 for each of approximately 10,000 post-1972 recordings infringed via LimeWire, plus "actual" damages for infringement of about 1,000 earlier works (statutory damages are not an option for the earlier works).

Plaintiffs are entitled to a single statutory damage award from Defendants per work infringed, regardless of how many individual users directly infringed that particular work.

— Hon. Kimba Wood (S.D.N.Y.)

=== Inapplicable direct infringement actions ===
The defendants then asked for a partial summary judgment exempting 104 works which had been directly infringed by LimeWire users, and for which the plaintiffs had already recovered damages in separate actions. The defendants claimed the individual defendants in those cases are "jointly and severally liable" with the defendants in this case, and, citing Bouchat v. Champion Prods., Inc., argued that the language of 17 USC 504 meant to group together all actions relating to infringement of a given set of works. The defense further contended that since only those 104 works had been proven to be directly infringed, they shouldn't be held liable for inducing infringement of any other works. The court denied the request, rejecting the notion that the other actions had any bearing on the inducement case, except to the extent that already-recovered damage amounts might be taken into account when calculating the inducement damages, and further holding that Bouchat doesn't apply; 17 USC 504 doesn't preclude finding inducement of infringement separately from finding direct infringement of the same works.

=== Damages phase ===
The damages phase of the trial began on 2 May 2011. LimeWire founder and CEO Mark Gorton admitted on the stand that he was aware of widespread copyright infringement by LimeWire users and that he chose not to make use of available filtering technology; and he said that until this trial, he believed that his company couldn't be held liable for inducing copyright infringement. Citing a 2001 statement he made to investors about the risk of being sued, and a 2005 notice sent by the RIAA making him aware that the decision in MGM Studios, Inc. v. Grokster, Ltd. meant that LimeWire was liable, the plaintiffs contended that he didn't misread the law, but rather knew all along that he was violating it. The RIAA further asserted that Gorton made efforts to hide LimeWire's profits in personal investments, in anticipation of a lawsuit.

=== Settlement ===
On 12 May 2011, a settlement was reached, and the case dismissed. LimeWire CEO Mark Gorton paid $105 million to the four largest record labels, which at that time were Universal Music Group, Sony BMG, Warner Music Group, and EMI.

== Press ==
=== Reactions to the injunction ===
One law and technology blog called the injunction a "smackdown" for LimeWire, a second, "Judge slaps Lime Wire with permanent injunction", while The New York Times brought quotes from both parties disagreeing on the impact of the decision.

The RIAA issued a press release urging previous LimeWire users to begin using one of the available legitimate options. The New York Times also ran a story about Gorton.

Finally, there was interest in what previous LimeWire users would do and where they would go—and if BitTorrent would be their next move.

=== Reporting of estimated damages ===
Although the plaintiffs never explicitly asked for a specific amount of damages—rather, the exact calculation was left as an exercise for the court—the press circulated several multitrillion-dollar estimates. Some press reports initially stated, accurately, that the largest estimate, $75 trillion, was no longer being sought, but later reports were written as if the RIAA was still seeking that amount. Many of these reports surfaced in mid-2012, over a year since the case had been settled.

==== 2010 ====
In mid-May 2010—which was after the summary judgment had been made finding liability, but well before damages had been capped and before the RIAA sought per-infringement damages—blogger Miles Harrison, on his slashparty blog (now defunct), reviewed court documents and estimated the potential damages being sought at $15 trillion. Harrison based his figure on a reported 200 million downloads of the LimeWire client software from Download.com alone, as cited in a filing by the plaintiff's lawyer. Harrison cut the 200 million in half to account for re-downloads and multiple installations by the same user, then assumed every user infringed an average of 1 work at issue in the case. He then multiplied that 100 million infringements by the upper limit for statutory damages, $150,000, to arrive at $15 trillion. This story was modestly promoted on Reddit, but wasn't widely reported.

A few weeks later, on 8 June 2010, blogger Jon Newton, in an article on his technology news blog p2pnet, arrived at his own estimate of $1.5 trillion, based on the same report of 200 million client downloads. Apparently conflating LimeWire software downloads with infringements of sound recordings, Newton computed his figure by multiplying 200 million by $750, the minimum statutory damage amount the filing said was being sought for each work infringed. The following day, Newton published a revised estimate of $15 trillion, quoting Harrison's calculations. Newton's first article was promoted on Reddit, but apparently wasn't picked up by the mainstream press.

==== 2011 ====
In March 2011, shortly after the court issued the ruling capping potential damages at $1.5 billion, an even higher estimate was reported: Corporate Counsel magazine and its affiliated Law.com website reported on 15 March that when seeking damages on a per-direct-infringement, rather than per-infringed-work basis, the record companies had "demanded damages ranging from $400 billion to $75 trillion"—figures taken from the defendants' pleadings. The report went on to say that Judge Wood had called the plaintiffs' request "absurd".

The Law.com article was popularized via Reddit on 22 March, and the $75 trillion figure was repeated in a PC Magazine article the next day. Two days later, citing the $75 trillion figure as if it were still being actively sought, Anonymous launched a DDoS attack on the RIAA website under the Operation Payback banner. The following week, in several Australian APN News & Media outlets, an op-ed piece repeated the $75 trillion figure, erroneously calculated from $150,000 × 11,000 infringed works (which actually comes to $1.65 billion).

==== 2012 ====
In May 2012, a year after the case was dismissed, an op-ed piece on a New Zealand news site reported on the case as if it were ongoing. Although it mentioned the March 2011 damages ruling, the piece repeated the $75 trillion estimate and added that the amount was in excess of the 2011 global GDP.

The revived story was then reported as news by the online edition of NME, with the amount dropped slightly to $72 trillion, and with the erroneous statement that the RIAA was still actively seeking that much in damages. The NME story linked back to an accurate, 2011 report in Computerworld, but made no mention of the court's ruling that limited the damages to a maximum of $1.5 billion. (Note: The original NME piece at http://www.nme.com/news/various-artists/63944 has since been removed, but it is quoted in its entirety at Zeropaid, and a summary remains on the NME site in the "20 Most Viewed News Stories of the Week", stating "The Recording Industry Association of America (RIAA) estimates that filesharing website LimeWire owes it over $72 trillion (£46 trillion) in damages. In October 2010, Limewire was forced to shut down after a judge in the Federal District Court ruled that its main filesharing functions be disabled, but the RIAA is still actively pursuing its owners for damages.")

This embellished version of the story "went viral" and was picked up as a current news report, without fact-checking, by numerous organizations, including Business Insider, PC World, a Forbes blog, a CBC business program, a Los Angeles CBS affiliate, and many entertainment and technology news blogs. Some reported the figure as $75 trillion, others as $72 trillion.

After it was pointed out that the case had been settled a year earlier and that the RIAA was not still seeking damages, some outlets pulled the story and some issued retractions, but many websites left the unedited story online. The Forbes retraction included a statement from the RIAA pointing out that no specific amount had ever been asked for, but the author countered that this is splitting hairs; a multitrillion-dollar amount was still implied.

== NMPA lawsuit ==
The case resulted in a separate lawsuit from National Music Publishers Association (NMPA) in order for them to be included in any future settlement negotiations and damages. This case ended with a settlement before the damages phase of the trial at hand.

== See also ==
- Legal aspects of file sharing
- Arista Records, LLC v. Launch Media, Inc
