= James L. Barksdale =

American executive

Jim Barksdale
- Born: James Love Barksdale; January 24, 1943 (age 83); Jackson, Mississippi, U.S.
- Education: University of Mississippi
- Known for: CEO of Netscape; COO of FedEx; Board Member of Time Warner
- Spouses: Sarah Weems "Sally" McDonnell (m. 1965; died 2003); Donna Kennedy Sones (m. 2005)
- Children: 6

James Love Barksdale (born January 24, 1943) is an American executive who served as the president and CEO of Netscape from January 1995 until the company merged with AOL in March 1999.

== Early life ==
James Barksdale was born in Jackson, Mississippi. He received a B.A. in business administration from the University of Mississippi in 1965. While there, Barksdale became a member of the Eta chapter of the Sigma Chi fraternity.

== Career ==
As CEO of Netscape, Barksdale was called before Congress several times during hearings about Microsoft and its alleged abuse of its operating system monopoly to dominate the web browser market (see also: Browser wars). At one point he addressed the entire room: "How many of you use Intel-based PCs in this audience, not Macintoshes?" Most people in the room raised their hands. "Of that group who use PCs, how many of you use a PC without Microsoft's operating system?" All of the hands went down. He said to the Senate panel, "Gentlemen, that is a monopoly."

Before Netscape, Barksdale had worked as CEO of McCaw Cellular/AT&T Wireless and, before that, as Vice President and COO of FedEx. After departing Netscape, he founded The Barksdale Group, an investment and advisory group created for the purpose of helping Internet service companies. He served on the boards of AOL and its successors (AOL Time Warner and then TimeWarner), as well as Sun Microsystems, myCFO, FedEx (until 2018) and Mississippi Today. President George W. Bush appointed him to the President's Foreign Intelligence Advisory Board in 2002.

Between March and July 2009, construction crews working for Barksdale's Spread Networks completed a nearly straight fiber-optic link between Chicago and New York City. By shaving 3 milliseconds off the previously fastest connection between these two trading centers, Barksdale, according to some industry insiders, can charge 8 to 10 times the going rate because any algorithm not operating on his network is at a significant speed disadvantage. The line was built almost entirely with his personal funds and in secret lest a competitor attempt to build another line before he was able to finish it.

== Personal life and philanthropy ==
He and his late wife, Sally, gave a US$5.4 million endowment to the University of Mississippi to help form the McDonnell-Barksdale Honors College. In January 2000, they gave US$100 million to the State of Mississippi to create The Barksdale Reading Institute, a joint venture with the Mississippi Department of Education and the state's public universities.

His wife, Sally Barksdale, died of cancer in 2003. He has three children and five grandchildren. To honor his deceased wife, Barksdale asked that the Honors College be renamed the Sally McDonnell Barksdale Honors College.

In 2005, he married Donna Kennedy Sones of Jackson, Mississippi; between them they have six children and five grandchildren. Barksdale's latest gift, given in conjunction with his wife Donna, created the Mississippi Principal Corps at the University of Mississippi that aims to change the way the state's school principals are trained.

His brother, Rhesa Barksdale, is a federal judge on the U.S. Court of Appeals for the Fifth Circuit.
