= Mark Gorton =

American executive

- Born: Mark Howard Gorton; November 7, 1966 (age 59)
- Education: Yale University; Stanford University; Harvard Business School
- Known for: Creator of LimeWire; Founder of Tower Research Capital

Mark Howard Gorton (born November 7, 1966) is the creator of LimeWire, a peer-to-peer file sharing client for the Java Platform, and chief executive of the Lime Group. Lime Group, based in New York, owns LimeWire as well as Lime Brokerage LLC (a stock brokerage), Tower Research Capital LLC (a hedge fund), and LimeMedical LLC (a medical software company).

Gorton holds a Bachelor's in Electrical Engineering from Yale University, a Master's in Electrical Engineering from Stanford University, and an MBA from Harvard University. He began his career as an electrical engineer for Martin Marietta (now part of Lockheed Martin), and, following his interests in business, entered the world of fixed-income trading at Credit Suisse First Boston prior to going out on his own and launching the Lime Group of companies.

Gorton owns Tower Research Capital LLC, a financial services firm he started in 1998.

Gorton created LimeWire in 2000, which subsequently became one of the most popular peer-to-peer file sharing clients over the next several years. Gorton was a key figure in Arista Records LLC v. Lime Group LLC, which in 2010 found Lime Group and Gorton personally liable for copyright infringement facilitated by LimeWire, with the parties agreeing to a permanent injunction to shut down LimeWire that year. The case was later settled in 2011 with Gorton paying $105 million to RIAA.

In 2005 Gorton backed The New York City Streets Renaissance Campaign (NYSCR). Two of the best known projects of NYSCR are Streetsblog and Streetfilms.

Gorton is involved in various green lifestyle issues, especially those having to do with transportation. At one point, Gorton was the single largest supporter of Transportation Alternatives, the New York City-based advocacy group for pedestrians, cyclists, and public transit. In 1999 he founded OpenPlans, a non-profit organization that developed GeoServer, a collaborative open source project encouraging green urban planning initiatives. In 2009 Utne Reader named Gorton one of "50 visionaries who are changing your world".

Gorton has supported Children's Health Defense, an anti-vaccine group run by Robert F. Kennedy Jr. CNBC described Gorton as having "dabbled in ... conspiracy theories", including suggesting that the assassination of John F. Kennedy was a “full scale coup d’état.”

In May 2025, Gorton launched the MAHA Institute, which he co-presides along with Tony Lyons. At a roundtable organized by the MAHA Institute in 2026, he claimed that “the childhood vaccination schedule needs to be eliminated”.
