= OpenPlans =

Nonprofit urbanist organization in NYC

Open Plans
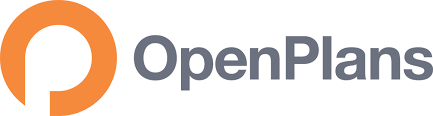
- Founded: 1999
- Founder: Mark Gorton
- Purpose: Urbanism and livability
- Location: New York City
- Method: Advocacy
- Website: OpenPlans

OpenPlans is a non-profit that advocates for making the streets of New York City livable for all residents. Open Plans uses tactical urbanism, grassroots advocacy, policy and targeted journalism to promote structural reforms within city government that support livable streets, neighborhoods and the city-at-large. The organization was founded in 1999 by Mark Gorton, the creator of LimeWire.

== Funding ==
The organization has received funding from Google, Institute for Transportation and Development Policy, Knight Foundation, the National Association of City Transportation Officials (NACTO), SURDNA Foundation, Rockefeller Foundation, the World Bank and others.

== Projects ==
OpenPlans organizes its activities into a number of divisions or projects.

=== Policy and Advocacy ===
OpenPlans engages in grassroots and cultural advocacy around issues of safe streets, traffic reduction, public space management, people-centered design, and livability.

Starting in 2018, OpenPlans began researching and writing about the importance of empowering communities to make choices about what their public spaces should look and feel like. Through this work, Open Plans began to see a lack of holistic attention and management to the City's streets and sidewalks. Although streets are invaluable public space in a dense city like New York, the Department of Transportation focuses on optimizing them almost entirely for the movement and storage of private vehicles. This creates issues of safety, walkability, accessibility, and diversity of use - issues that disproportionately harm communities already dealing with structural inequity and racism. Open Plans identified a need to advocate for building and managing public spaces that foster safety, joy, care and connection.

OpenPlans' policy work focuses on reforming city government to be more responsive to the New York communities' needs. Campaigns include advocating for an Office of Public Space Management, promoting traffic-calming measures and street redesigns for better pedestrian experience, and eliminating parking minimums for new construction of buildings. Open Plans also uses grassroots advocacy and tactical urbanism projects to learn about city agencies and the areas where they could be improved. The Summer of Play report is a deep dive into improving the process for community-planned street events.

=== StreetopiaUWS ===
StreetopiaUWS is a division of OpenPlans that focuses on community-driven livability and public space improvements for the Upper West Side of Manhattan.

Reunited by their mutual desire for 21st-century transportation infrastructure at the 79th Street Rotunda, volunteers and staff from the Upper West Side Streets Renaissance Campaign joined forces in early 2019 to create StreetopiaUWS. StreetopiaUWS’ vision includes streets that are lively, green and healthy places where neighbors meet, kids play and people move efficiently and safely by bike and on foot.

StreetopiaUWS inspires Upper West Siders to see neighborhood streets as public spaces that enhance their quality of life and community and connect them. Outreach, advocacy, and tactical urbanism help accomplish this mission and equip Upper West Siders with the strategies and tools to help create their vision.

=== Streetfilms ===
The Streetfilms project produces and publishes short films advocating transportation design and public policy. Streetfilms has produced over a thousand videos, which have been watched over 4 million times. These films are normally published using a Creative Commons license. Janette Sadik-Khan, who served as New York City’s Transportation Commissioner in the late 2000s, praised Streetfilms videos as instrumental in shifting New Yorkers' opinions and making them more amenable to changes.

Their most popular videos include a piece about the Ciclovia in Bogotá where streets are made into carfree facilities every Sunday. Such events now take place in many places around the world (180,000 views) and on Physically Separated Bike Lanes (111,000 views). In 2010, at a time when New York city was planning to implement 20 mph speed limits, Streetfilms produced a short video of the experience of 20 mph speed limits in the UK, where 3 million people already lived in 20 mph speed limit areas.

Streetfilms was started by Clarence Eckerson in 2004 with support from Mark Gorton.

=== Streetsblog ===
Streetsblog is a project run by OpenPlans providing a daily news source connecting people to information about sustainable transportation and livable communities. Streetsblog was founded by Aaron Naparestek in 2006 and has 'hundreds of thousands' of regular readers.

Streetsblog NYC and Streetsblog USA are currently edited by Gersh Kuntzman.

Streetsblog California covers news on California street and highway improvements and is edited by Damien Newton and publishes daily except weekends and holidays.

Streetsblog Los Angeles covers the Greater Los Angeles area news on street improvements and transportation issues and is edited by Joe Linton and publishes daily except weekends and holidays. Linton, Newton, and communities editor Sahra Sulaiman have all been honored by the Los Angeles Press Club for their reporting at Streetsblog Los Angeles both individually and as a group.

Streetsblog San Francisco is edited by Roger Rudick and publishes daily except weekends and holidays.

Since March 2013 the Streetsblog runs a "Parking Madness" tournament. 16 downtowns are nominated and a head-to-head contests are run through the month with readers deciding which city has built the most parking in their downtown. The winners are awarded the "Golden Crater."

Year	Golden Crater Winner
2015	Camden, New Jersey
2014	Rochester, New York
2013	Tulsa, Oklahoma
