= Spread Networks =

Fiber-optic networking company

Spread Networks is a company founded by Dan Spivey and backed by James L. Barksdale (former CEO of Netscape ) that claims to offer Internet connectivity between Chicago and New York City at ultra-low latency (i.e. speeds that are very close to the speed of light), high bandwidth, and high reliability, using dark fiber. Its customers are primarily firms engaged in high-frequency trading, where small reductions in latency are important to the extent that they help one close trades before one's competitors.

== History ==
The first cable line, running 827 miles (1,331 km) from Chicago (home to the Chicago Mercantile Exchange, where futures and options are traded) to Carteret, New Jersey (home to the Nasdaq data center), laid at a cost of US$300 million, was unveiled in June 2010. According to a Forbes article, the idea for the line first came to Dan Spivey in 2007: Spivey contracted with a New York hedge fund to devise a low-latency arbitrage strategy, wherein the fund would search out tiny discrepancies between futures contracts in Chicago and their underlying equities in New York. Although he successfully created the strategy, he was not able to execute it because he was not able to get access to the market's lowest-latency line. He spent some time researching the feasibility of building an ultra-low-latency line, and then looked for people willing to fund it and found Jim Barksdale. Construction was in full swing (but in extreme secrecy, to avoid getting scooped by competitors) by early 2009.

In 2011, Spread Networks expanded to Equinix NY4 IBX data center in Secaucus, New Jersey, 300 Boulevard East in Weehawken, New Jersey, and 165 Halsey Street in Newark, New Jersey. In October 2012, Spread Networks announced latency improvements, bringing the estimated roundtrip time from 13.1 milliseconds to 12.98 milliseconds. In January 2014, Spread Networks announced that it had opened a point of presence at the NYSE Euronext trading center located in Mahwah, New Jersey.

Announced November 27, 2017, Zayo Group Holdings, Inc. ("Zayo") (NYSE: ZAYO) entered into a definitive agreement to acquire Spread Networks for $127 million in cash.

== Technology ==
Spread Networks uses fiber optic cables along a route as close to straight as possible to connect the Chicago area with the New York area, specifically connecting Chicago (home to the Chicago Mercantile Exchange) to Carteret, New Jersey (home to the Nasdaq data center). According to their website, the network is monitored continuously and all parts of the network are driven daily to guarantee reliability and proactively fix problems. They also offer colocation facilities for servers at Chicago, Carteret, and Cleveland, all along the line. Their estimated roundtrip time along the dark fiber line (from Chicago to Carteret) is 13 milliseconds. Their wave service lines promise roundtrip times of about 14.1-14.2 milliseconds, down from about 14.6 milliseconds in 2011.

According to a Wired article, the estimated roundtrip time for an ordinary cable is 14.5 milliseconds, giving users of Spread Networks a slight advantage. However, because glass has a higher refractive index than air (about 1.5 compared to about 1), the roundtrip time for fiber optic cable transmission is 50% more than that for transmission through the air. Some companies, such as McKay Brothers, Metrorede and Tradeworx, are using air-based transmission to offer lower estimated roundtrip times (8.2 milliseconds and 8.5 milliseconds respectively) that are very close to the theoretical minimum possible (about 7.9-8 milliseconds).

== See also ==
- Flash Boys: A Wall Street Revolt by Michael Lewis
- The Hummingbird Project
