= The Hummingbird Project =

2018 film by Kim Nguyen

- Theatrical release poster
- Directed by: Kim Nguyen
- Written by: Kim Nguyen
- Produced by: Pierre Even
- Starring: Jesse Eisenberg; Alexander Skarsgård; Michael Mando; Sarah Goldberg; Salma Hayek
- Cinematography: Nicolas Bolduc
- Edited by: Arthur Tarnowski; Nicolas Chaudeurge
- Music by: Yves Gourmeur
- Production companies: Item 7; Belga Productions; Automatik; HanWay Films; Telefilm Canada
- Distributed by: Elevation Pictures (Canada); Belga Films (Belgium)
- Release dates: September 8, 2018 (TIFF); March 15, 2019 (United States)
- Running time: 111 minutes
- Countries: Canada; Belgium
- Language: English
- Budget: $17 Million
- Box office: $878,199

The Hummingbird Project is a 2018 thriller drama film about high-frequency trading and ultra-low latency direct market access, written and directed by Kim Nguyen. It stars Jesse Eisenberg, Alexander Skarsgård, Michael Mando, Sarah Goldberg, and Salma Hayek.

It had its world premiere at the 2018 Toronto International Film Festival on September 8, 2018. It was released in the United States on March 15, 2019, by The Orchard and was released on March 22, 2019, in Canada by Elevation Pictures.

== Plot ==
Stockbroker Vincent Zaleski pitches Bryan Taylor on investing in a fiberoptic cable from Kansas electronic exchange to the New York Stock Exchange in order to more quickly execute orders in a new high-frequency trading (HFT) operation. Taylor buys into the idea. Meanwhile, Vincent and his cousin Anton Zaleski are still employed by Eva Torres, where Anton programs trading software. Eva is also working on several ideas for HFT. Soon enough, Anton and Vincent quit, infuriating Eva. She insists that any code Anton created for her firm belongs to it, and even the thoughts in his head might be proprietary.

Vincent has hired Mark Vega to oversee the building of the fiberoptic cable tunnel. Vincent occasionally helps Mark purchase or lease the rights to land in order to make the cable as straight as possible. Any deviation in the shape of the tunnel will create delays in the trade. Anton is hard at work trying to shave one millisecond off the time it takes to transmit orders to NYC. Currently, his software will do it in seventeen milliseconds, which is not fast enough to be competitive. It needs to be at most sixteen milliseconds to be a viable enterprise for Taylor's firm.

Eva finds an NYU student who has written a paper about microwave pulses to effect HFT. She hires him and starts the process of building a series of towers to make trades with microwaves. As Vincent struggles with acquiring land, being diagnosed with cancer, and broken drill bits, Eva manages to finish her microwave towers first, dominating the market.

Eva also takes revenge on Anton by having him arrested by the FBI for stock market fraud by using stolen property in the form of the software that he wrote for her company. While Anton is in jail, he triggers a logic bomb that he left in Eva's software as an insurance policy; this results in a twenty-millisecond slow-down in her trading, rendering her microwaves useless. She subsequently drops Anton's charges in exchange for learning how to fix the bug.

In the hospital Bryan visits Vincent and accuses Vincent of failing him, costing him hundreds of millions of dollars and revealing he might lose his company. As Vincent undergoes chemotherapy, Mark shows him that he has completed the project and the speed achieved is 15.73 milliseconds, although Vincent admits that they are now obsolete. Vincent bought a cheap insurance policy on the project, but the insurance company denied to pay the claim and the project has cost him all his money. Anton reveals his next idea for HFT involves neutrino messaging, believing it could cut the time from Kansas City to NYC down to as little as nine milliseconds.

== Cast ==
- Jesse Eisenberg as Vincent Zaleski
- Alexander Skarsgård as Anton Zaleski
- Salma Hayek as Eva Torres
- Michael Mando as Mark Vega
- Sarah Goldberg as Mascha
- Anna Maguire as Jenny
- Frank Schorpion as Bryan Taylor
- Johan Heldenbergh as Amish Elder
- Kwasi Songui as Ray
- Ayisha Issa as Ophelia Troller

== Production ==
In May 2017, it was announced Jesse Eisenberg and Alexander Skarsgård had joined the cast of the film, with Kim Nguyen directing from a screenplay he wrote. Pierre Even served as a producer on the film, while Brian Kavanaugh-Jones and Fred Berger served as executive producers, under their Item 7, Automatik and HanWay Films banners, respectively. In September 2017, Salma Hayek joined the cast, followed in October 2017 by Michael Mando.

Principal photography began in Quebec in November 2017.

== Release ==
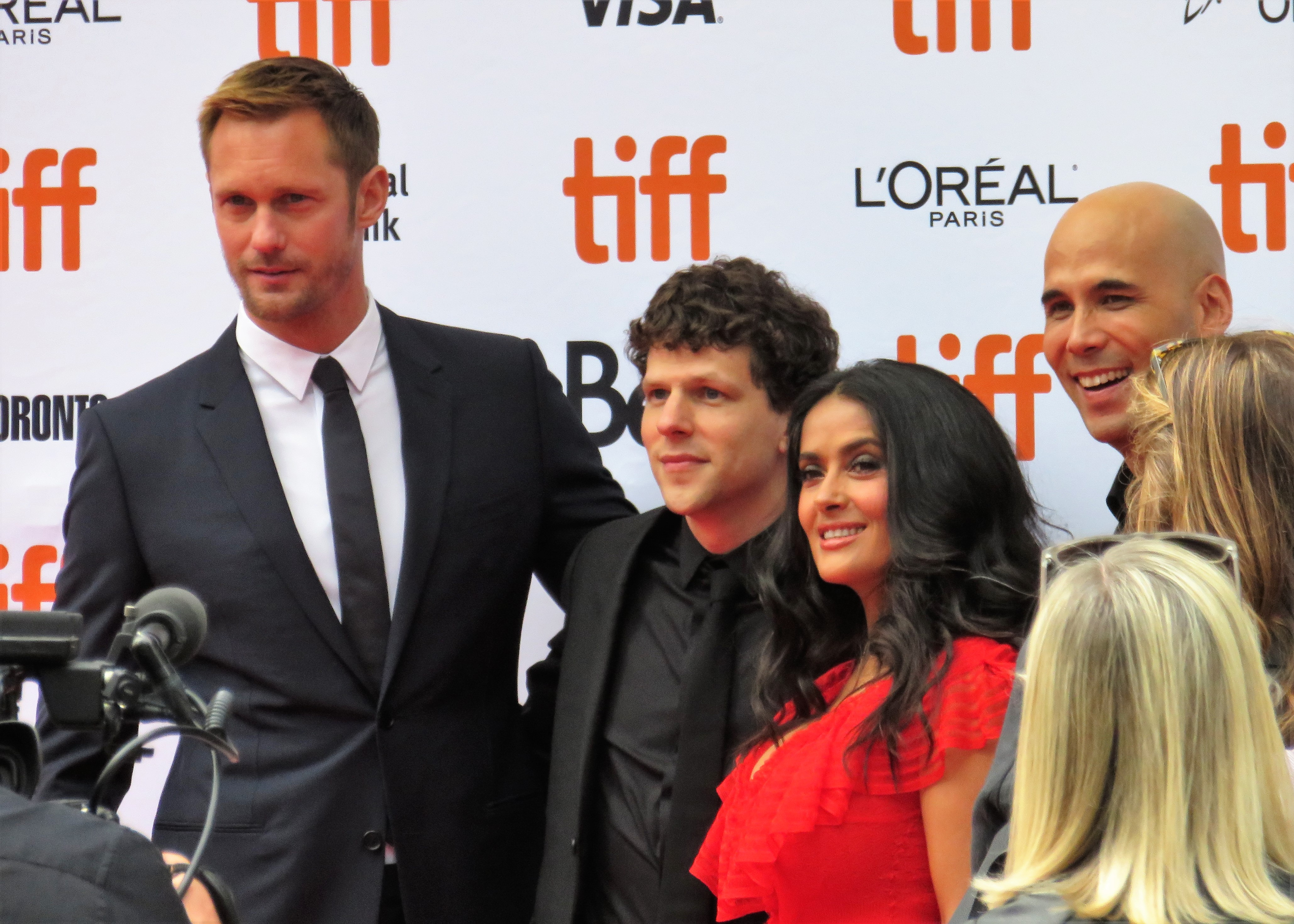
Alexander Skarsgård, Jesse Eisenberg, Salma Hayek, and Kim Nguyen at the premiere of The Hummingbird Project at the 2018 Toronto International Film Festival

The film had its world premiere at the Toronto International Film Festival on September 8, 2018, and was the opening gala at the Vancouver International Film Festival later that month. Shortly after, The Orchard acquired U.S. distribution rights to the film. It had a limited release in the United States on March 15, 2019.

== Factual basis ==
The communication systems portrayed in the film do exist. Spread Networks activated their essentially straight fiber-optic cable in 2010 saving approximately 175 mi (282 km) over the existing route from Chicago to New York, and their journey is depicted in Michael Lewis's book Flash Boys. McKay Brothers and Tradeworx began providing microwave radio service in 2012.

== Reception ==
=== Box office ===
The Hummingbird Project grossed $371,784 in the United States and Canada, and $527,253 in other territories, for a total worldwide gross of $900,037.

=== Critical response ===
On review aggregator Rotten Tomatoes, the film holds an approval rating of 58%, based on 123 reviews, and an average rating of 6.1/10. The website's critical consensus reads, "Smart and well-acted, The Hummingbird Project marks a flawed yet undeniably intriguing addition to writer-director Kim Nguyen's filmography." On Metacritic, the film has a weighted average score of 58 out of 100, based on 26 critics, indicating "mixed or average reviews". Mike McCahill of The Guardian gave the film two stars out of five, stating "We get intriguing ideas, images and locations, and enough closeups of excavation equipment to enrapture plant-hire enthusiasts. With few narrative or thematic hook-ups, though, I guarantee plenty of head scratching in front of this curio". Odie Herderson of RogerEbert.com gave the movie two stars out of four, commenting "Though Nguyen is the only credited writer here, “The Hummingbird Project” feels like one of those movies where nine different people contributed to the proceedings without reading what anybody else wrote. I was ready to check out once we got to the major grab for sympathy (complete with hospital visit) that closes out the film. It's a shame because the acting is quite good here, especially an against-type Skarsgård. His Anton is rather complex and he gets one hell of a celebratory dance sequence. I identified with his little boogie-woogie; finally someone put onscreen what it feels like when your code does what it's supposed to do".

Ben Kenigsberg of The New York Times added "“The Hummingbird Project” may be too committed to its popcorn mechanics to double as a truly brainy exposé, but it pays other dividends. Eisenberg adds unexpected shades of humanity to his lizard persona from “The Social Network,” while a bald, unrecognizable Skarsgard pulls off the difficult feat of being sympathetically antisocial as a coder driven batty by his work. As the geological, financial and personal barriers the cousins face grow increasingly absurd, the movie works up a satisfying sweat". Jonathan Dean of GQ wrote, "But in its own way, the film winds up as Margin Call meets Glengarry Glen Ross meets, yes, The Social Network. And by harking back to the latter, the director has the Eisenberg we fell for. It has his twitch, but with a heart, the idea he is the smartest man in the room, but doesn't want people to know it".

== See also ==
- The Big Short
