= Economic Espionage Act of 1996 =

United States espionage legislation

- Long title: An Act to amend title 18, United States Code, to protect proprietary economic information, and for other purposes.
- Acronyms (colloquial): EEA, NIIPA
- Nicknames: National Information Infrastructure Protection Act of 1996
- Enacted by: the 104th United States Congress
- Effective: October 11, 1996

Citations
- Public law: 104-294
- Statutes at Large: 110 Stat. 3488

Codification
- Titles amended: 18 U.S.C.: Crimes and Criminal Procedure; 42 U.S.C.: Public Health and Social Welfare
- U.S.C. sections amended: 18 U.S.C. ch. 47 § 1030; 18 U.S.C. ch. 90 §1831 et seq.; 18 U.S.C. ch. 227, subch. A § 3552; 18 U.S.C. ch. 313 § 4243; 42 U.S.C. ch. 136, subch. II § 13751 et seq.

Legislative history
- Introduced in the House as H.R. 3723 by Bill McCollum (R–FL) on June 26, 1996; Committee consideration by House Judiciary; Passed the House on September 17, 1996 (399-3, Roll call vote 416, via Clerk.House.gov); Passed the Senate on September 18, 1996 (passed unanimous consent) with amendment; House agreed to Senate amendment on September 28, 1996 (agreed without objection) with further amendment; Senate agreed to House amendment on October 2, 1996 (agreed unanimous consent); Signed into law by President Bill Clinton on October 11, 1996

The Economic Espionage Act of 1996 (Pub. L. 104–294 (text) (PDF), 110 Stat. 3488, enacted October 11, 1996) was a 6 title Act of Congress dealing with a wide range of issues, including not only industrial espionage (e.g., the theft or misappropriation of a trade secret and the National Information Infrastructure Protection Act), but the insanity defense, matters regarding the Boys & Girls Clubs of America, requirements for presentence investigation reports, and the United States Sentencing Commission reports regarding encryption or scrambling technology, and other technical and minor amendments.

== Structure of the Act ==
Title	Name	Description
I	Protection of trade secrets	Inserts 18 U.S.C. §§ 1831–1839 as Chapter 90 of Title 18 of the United States Code
II	National Information Infrastructure Protection Act of 1996	Amends 18 U.S.C. § 1030 regarding fraud and related activity in connection with computers.
III	Transfer of persons found not guilty by reason of insanity	Amends 18 U.S.C. § 4243 with regard to such persons being transferred to the custody of the United States Attorney General
IV	Establishment of Boys and Girls Clubs	Authorizes grants by the United States Department of Justice to the Boys and Girls Clubs of America
V	Use of certain technology to facilitate criminal conduct	Requiring the United States Sentencing Commission to provide certain information in its reports
VI	Technical and minor amendments	Various

== Protection of trade secrets ==
The act makes the theft or misappropriation of a trade secret a federal crime. Unlike the Espionage Act of 1917 (found at 18 U.S.C. §§ 792–799), the offense involves commercial information, not classified or national defense information.

Section	Name	Description
18 U.S.C. § 1831	Economic espionage	Criminalizes the misappropriation of trade secrets (including conspiracy to misappropriate trade secrets and the subsequent acquisition of such misappropriated trade secrets) with the knowledge or intent that the theft will benefit a foreign government or entity. Penalties for violation are fines of up to US$500,000 per offense and imprisonment of up to 15 years for individuals, and fines of up to US$10 million for organizations.
18 U.S.C. § 1832	Theft of trade secrets	Criminalizes the misappropriation of trade secrets related to or included in a product that is produced for or placed in interstate (including international) commerce, with the knowledge or intent that the misappropriation will injure the owner of the trade secret. Penalties for violation of section 1832 are imprisonment for up to 10 years for individuals (no fines) and fines of up to US$5 million for organizations.
18 U.S.C. § 1833	Exceptions to prohibitions	Provisions do not apply to lawful activity by government entities, or to the reporting of any suspected violation of law to any such entity.
18 U.S.C. § 1834	Criminal forfeiture	Requires criminal forfeiture of any proceeds of the crime and property derived from proceeds of the crime, and any property used, or intended to be used, in commission of the crime.
18 U.S.C. § 1835	Orders to preserve confidentiality	The court shall enter such orders and take such other action as may be necessary and appropriate to preserve the confidentiality of trade secrets, subject to certain specified provisions of law.
18 U.S.C. § 1836	Civil proceedings to enjoin violations	Authorizes civil proceedings by the Department of Justice to enjoin violations of the Act, but does not create a private cause of action. Thus, victims or putative victims must work with the U.S. Attorney in order to obtain an injunction.
18 U.S.C. § 1837	Conduct outside the United States	There is extraterritorial jurisdiction where: The offender is a U.S. citizen or permanent resident; or; The offender is an organization organized under the laws of the United States or any State or political subdivision thereof; or; An act in furtherance of the offense was committed in the United States
18 U.S.C. § 1838	Construction with other laws	Does not affect any other civil or criminal laws with respect to misappropriation of trade secrets.
18 U.S.C. § 1839	Definitions	

"Trade secrets" are defined in the act consistent with generally accepted legal definitions such as those used in the Uniform Trade Secrets Act and state laws based on the UTSA. Specifically it declares:

(3) the term "trade secret" means all forms and types of financial, business, scientific, technical, economic, or engineering information, including patterns, plans, compilations, program devices, formulas, designs, prototypes, methods, techniques, processes, procedures, programs, or codes, whether tangible or intangible, and whether or how stored, compiled, or memorialized physically, electronically, graphically, photographically, or in writing if—

(A) the owner thereof has taken reasonable measures to keep such information secret; and
(B) the information derives independent economic value, actual or potential, from not being generally known to, and not being readily ascertainable through proper means by, the public

== Enforcement ==
=== Department of Justice policy ===
The United States Department of Justice Criminal Division has issued a prosecution policy relating to enforcement of the Act. In general, it states:

The EEA is not intended to criminalize every theft of trade secrets for which civil remedies may exist under state law. It was passed in recognition of the increasing importance of the value of intellectual property in general, and trade secrets in particular to the economic well-being and security of the United States and to close a federal enforcement gap in this important area of law. Appropriate discretionary factors to be considered in deciding whether to initiate a prosecution under § 1831 or § 1832 include:

(a) the scope of the criminal activity, including evidence of involvement by a foreign government, foreign agent or foreign instrumentality;
(b) the degree of economic injury to the trade secret owner;
(c) the type of trade secret misappropriated;
(d) the effectiveness of available civil remedies; and
(e) the potential deterrent value of the prosecution.

The availability of a civil remedy should not be the only factor considered in evaluating the merits of a referral because the victim of a trade secret theft almost always has recourse to a civil action. The universal application of this factor would thus defeat the Congressional intent in passing the EEA.

=== Use of EEA ===
The Act can be employed to accomplish several purposes:

- It can be used to protect a company's valuable intellectual property by prosecuting dishonest competitors who steal a company's trade secrets, but
- it can also be used against a company that finds itself with trade secrets belonging to a competitor.

In United States v. Lange, the EEA was used to protect a victim company that had learned that Lange, a disgruntled former employee, had been offering to sell its secret manufacturing processes to third parties. The company reported Lange to the FBI, and Lange was arrested and subsequently convicted and sentenced to 30 months in prison. The case was successful in large part because the company undertook reasonable measures to keep its information secret, including:

1. physically securing the trade secrets in question
2. limiting the distribution of documentation describing the trade secret
3. limiting the number of employees with access to the trade secret
4. notifying such employees that they were working with confidential information, and placing warnings on trade secret information
5. providing vendors with only partial information of the trade secret, so that it could not be replicated

The EEA has also been used to prosecute a Boeing manager, together with an employee he hired from Lockheed Martin with the offer of a higher salary in return for his inside information on Lockheed Martin's pricing. Although the EEA charges were later dropped, the matter resulted in Boeing being denied $1 billion in contracts from the United States Air Force, as well as it paying a $615 million settlement to the US Government.

=== § 1831 - First conviction and sentence ===
In February 2010, former Boeing engineer Dongfan "Greg" Chung was sentenced to 16 years in prison, following the first ever trial conviction under the 1996 Economic Espionage Act. Chung, a native of China, was convicted by the US District Court for the Central District of California of stealing Boeing trade secrets related to the US Space Shuttle program and the Delta IV rocket. He spent over 30 years providing U.S. aerospace technologies to China. Chung was convicted on charges related to 350,000 pages of sensitive documents and Chinese Intelligence Service tasking letters found concealed in crawl spaces underneath and inside his home. The trade secrets misappropriated by Chung for China were valued over $2 billion.

The investigation, led by Special Agent Kevin Moberly of the FBI's Los Angeles Field Office, resulted in Chung's arrest in February 2008. Charges included conspiracy to commit economic espionage, six counts of economic espionage to benefit a foreign country, one count of acting as an agent of the People's Republic of China, and one count of making false statements to the FBI. The 16-year sentence was viewed as a life sentence for Chung who was 74 years old. Chung subsequently died in 2020 at age 84 from coronavirus-related complications while incarcerated at the Federal Correctional Complex, Butner.

Chung worked for Rockwell International from 1973 until its defense and space unit was acquired by Boeing in 1996, and he continued to work for Boeing as an employee and then as a contractor through 2006. Chung's investigation was initially predicated on evidence discovered during an investigation into Chi Mak, a Chinese-American engineer convicted in 2007 of conspiring to export sensitive naval technologies to China and sentenced to more than 24 years in prison.

At Chung's sentencing, presiding judge, Cormac Carney, said that he could not "put a price tag" on national security, and that with the long sentence for Chung he wanted to send a signal to China to "stop sending your spies here."

In April 2012, Chung's conviction was upheld by the United States Court of Appeals for the Ninth Circuit.

=== § 1832 - First conviction and sentence ===
Most prosecutions under the Economic Espionage Act have been for violation of Section 1832 (Trade Secret Theft). The first such prosecution was of Daniel and Patrick Worthing, maintenance workers at PPG Industries in Pennsylvania who stole blueprints and diskettes. Both pleaded guilty in early 1997. For another example, see the first conviction in California, that of David Brian Kern.

After an August, 2007 plea of guilt for (one count) of violating the Economic Espionage Act and one count of violating the Arms Export Control Act, San Jose U.S. District Court Judge Jeremy Fogel sentenced Canadian citizen Xiaodong Sheldon Meng, 44, to 24 months in federal prison, 3 years of parole and a $10,000 fine, with forfeiture of computer equipment seized. Meng was indicted in December 2006, with 36 counts, "for stealing military software from a Silicon Valley defense contractor and trying to sell it to the Chinese military." The first to be convicted of Economic Espionage (Section 1831), Meng admitted "illegally obtaining a program used for military training from Quantum3D and later using the program in a demonstration to the People's Liberation Army Navy after he no longer worked for the firm; he attempted to sell the fighter-pilot training software programs to the Royal Thai Air Force, the Royal Malaysian Air Force and the Navy Research Center in China." He paid $500,000 bond, for temporary liberty, until August 18 when he begins serving sentence.

On June 18, 2008, Meng was the first individual sentenced under the Economic Espionage statute. Meng was the first person convicted of both the Economic Espionage Act of 1996 and the Arms Export Control Act. He received a 24-month sentence and $10,000 fine, which included a sentencing departure for cooperation, according to news reports.

== Further developments ==
=== Intersection with trade law ===
The International Trade Commission has used the EEA's definition of misappropriation to support its enforcement of US trade laws that prohibit "unfair methods of competition and unfair acts in the importation of articles ... in the United States." In Tianrui Group Company Limited LLC v International Trade Commission, the United States Court of Appeals for the Federal Circuit held that the manufacture abroad of products using a process that was developed in the United States, protected under domestic trade secret law, and misappropriated abroad, violated section 337 of the Tariff Act of 1930, 19 U.S.C. § 1337. The ITC therefore had the authority to bar the importation of such products into the United States.

=== Scope of trade secrets ===
The extent to which trade secrets are covered under § 1832 was expanded in 2012, following the reversal of a conviction in April 2012 by the United States Court of Appeals for the Second Circuit in United States v. Aleynikov. In that case, it was held that the theft of the source code for a proprietary system at Goldman Sachs was never intended to be placed in interstate or foreign commerce. As Goldman had no intention of selling or licensing its system, § 1832 (as it was written at that time) did not apply. The provision was promptly amended on December 28, 2012 with the passage of the Theft of Trade Secrets Clarification Act of 2012, so that it now applies to products or services that are used or intended for use in interstate or foreign commerce. The amendment led to a conviction in United States v. Agrawal.

=== Expansion of penalties ===
On January 24, 2013, § 1831 was amended to increase the maximum fines:

- in the case of individuals, from $500,000 to $5,000,000, and
- in the case of organizations, from $10,000,000 to "the greater of $10,000,000 or 3 times the value of the stolen trade secret to the organization."

=== Civil cause of action ===
On May 11, 2016, in what Forbes called "the single most important intellectual property development since Congress enacted the America Invents Act," the Defend Trade Secrets Act (Pub. L. 114–153 (text) (PDF)) expanded the EEA's reach. In cases filed after that date:

- 18 U.S.C. § 1836(b) is replaced to provide for private civil actions, including (subject to appropriate safeguards) ex parte orders "providing for the seizure of property necessary to prevent the propagation or dissemination of the trade secret that is the subject of the action." Remedies available to the court include the granting of injunctions, awarding of damages (including treble damages in cases of wilful and malicious misappropriation) and the awarding of costs in cases where the claim was made in bad faith.
- 18 U.S.C. § 1832(b) is amended to provide for criminal fines to be the greater of $5,000,000 or three times the trade secret's value (including any reproduction costs that the holder of the trade secret has avoided).
- 18 U.S.C. § 1961(1) is amended to include 18 U.S.C. §§ 1831–1832 in the RICO list of predicate offences signifying racketeering activity.
- 18 U.S.C. § 1833 is amended to provide for whistleblower protection for an individual who makes a confidential disclosure to a government official in cases of a suspected violation of the law, or files a sealed document to the court with respect to an antiretaliation lawsuit. As a reinforcing measure, employers are required to include a notice of such immunity in any employment agreement that governs trade secrets and other confidential information.

== Impact of the Act ==
This legislation has created much debate within the business intelligence community regarding the legality and ethics of various forms of information gathering designed to provide business decision-makers with competitive advantages in areas such as strategy, marketing, research and development, or negotiations. Most business intelligence (also known as competitive intelligence practitioners) rely largely on the collection and analysis of open source information from which they identify events, patterns, and trends of actionable interest. However, some techniques focus on the collection of publicly available information that is in limited circulation. This may be obtained through a number of direct and indirect techniques that share common origins in the national intelligence community. The use of these techniques is often debated from legal and ethical standpoints based on this Act.

One such example is the collection and analysis of gray literature. The techniques for developing actionable intelligence from limited circulation / limited availability documents such as selected corporate publications can raise difficult legal and ethical questions under both intellectual property laws and the Economic Espionage Act.

The Society for Competitive Intelligence Professionals provides training and publications which outline a series of guidelines designed to support business intelligence professionals seeking to comply with both the legal restrictions of the EEA as well as the ethical considerations involved. In 1999, the Society of Competitive Intelligence Professionals published its Policy Analysis on Competitive Intelligence and the Economic Espionage Act which explained how the Economic Espionage Act will not affect legitimate competitive intelligence. The National Law Journal of March 29, 2000, reviewed the Policy Analysis and reported that the Policy Analysis' conclusion was that the EEA's "impact on legitimate competitive intelligence would be negligible" and that "nearly four years" after the EEA's passage, "it appears that the [Policy Analysis'] predictions were on target."

The EEA was developed on the basis of a national philosophy that emphasizes a "level playing field" for all business competitors that arose in no small part due to the size and diversity of the American private sector. Many other nations not only lack such legislation, but actively support industrial espionage using both their national intelligence services as well as less formal mechanisms including bribery and corruption. The United States Office of the National Counterintelligence Executive publishes an annual report on Foreign Economic Collection and Industrial Espionage mandated by the U.S. Congress which outlines these espionage activities of many foreign nations.

The United States does not engage in state-sanctioned industrial espionage. In 2000, in response to European concerns, a former U.S. Director of Central Intelligence, James Woolsy, said (in the March 17, 2000 Wall Street Journal editorial) that if there is collection, it's usually focused on bribery by European companies, not on access to technologies. Woolsey said "most European technology just isn't worth our stealing." As DCI, Woolsey testified before Congress that he was reluctant to engage in economic espionage as the endeavor is "fraught with complexities, legal difficulties (and) foreign policy difficulties."

In 2000, the European Parliament voted to carry out an investigation into the international surveillance project ECHELON. That same year the French government also began an official investigation into allegations that several collaborating nations may be using the program for illegal purposes. U.S. Central Intelligence Agency documents had been revealed to the British press, showing that the U.S. has been using the technology to monitor European business communications. The French and European allegations centered on the suspicion that such information was being passed to U.S. firms. The U.S. stated that monitoring was focused on the participation of European firms in supplying foreign WMD (weapons of mass destruction) programs, such as the Iran nuclear program, on evading sanctions in Iran and Libya, and on the bribery of foreign officials, such as French payments to Saudi Defense officials.

== See also ==
- ITT Corporation
- Non-disclosure agreement
- Trade secret
