= Sally McDonnell Barksdale Honors College =

Honors program at the University of Mississippi

Coordinates: 34.367387°N 89.532003°W

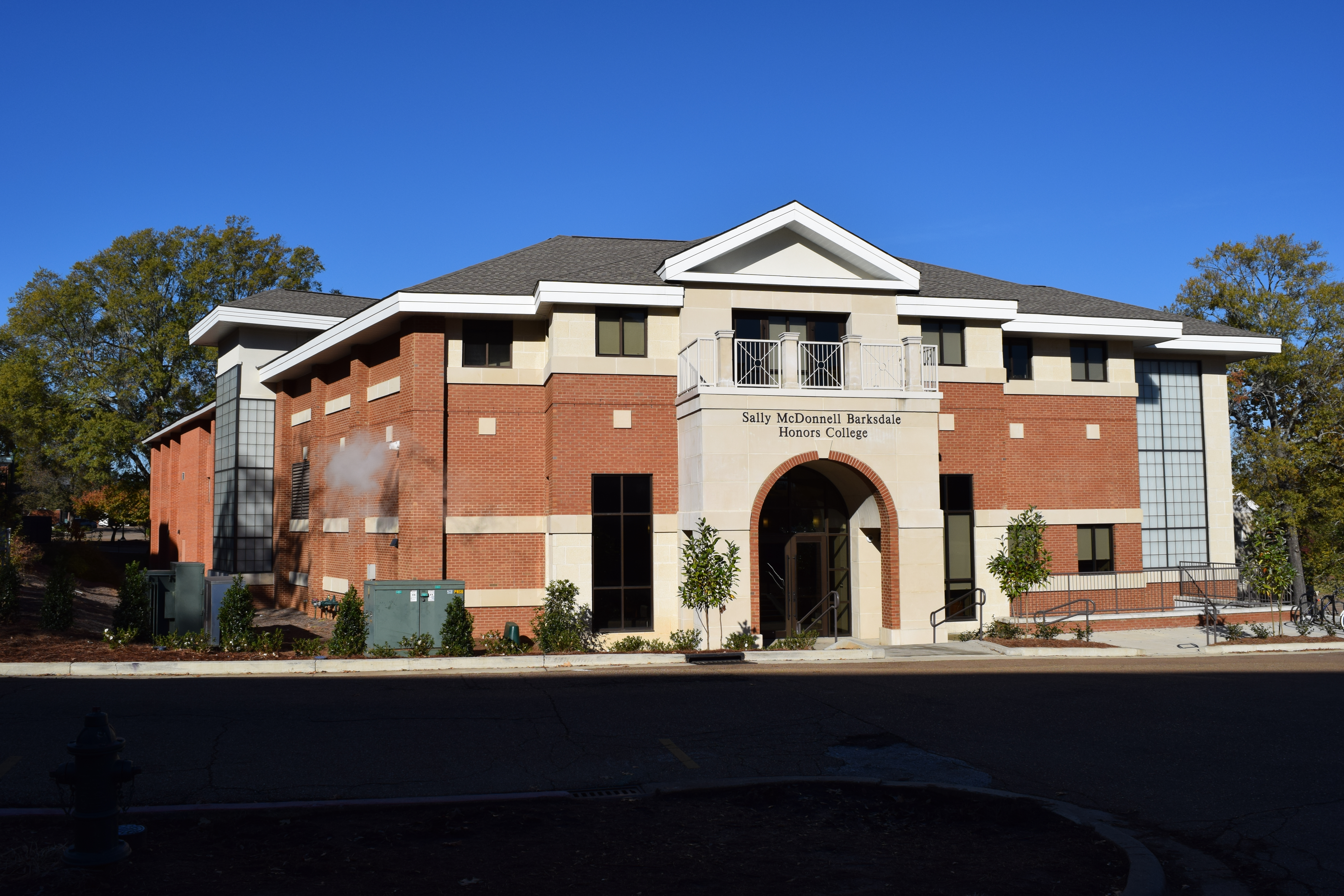
Sally McDonnell Barksdale Honors College

The Sally McDonnell Barksdale Honors College (SMBHC) is the honors program at the University of Mississippi in the United States. It was founded in 1997 through an endowment from Jim and Sally Barksdale. The institute originally bore the name McDonnell-Barksdale Honors College but was renamed upon the death of Sally Barksdale in 2003.

The Dean of the SMBHC is Ethel Scurlock.

In 2005, Reader's Digest named the college Best Honors College in its Best of America issue.
