= Tower Research Capital =

Automated trading firm

Tower Research Capital LLC
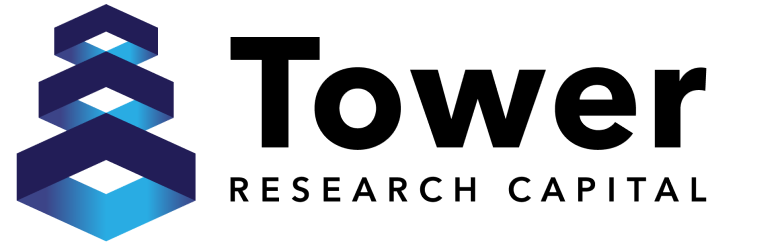
- Type: Limited liability company (LLC)
- Industry: Financial services
- Founded: February 1998; 28 years ago
- Founders: Mark Gorton; Alistair Brown
- Headquarters: New York City, United States
- Number of locations: 11
- Key people: Albert An (CEO); Mark Gorton (chairman)
- Services: High-frequency trading services
- Number of employees: c. 1,400+ (2026)
- Subsidiaries: Latour Trading
- Website: tower-research.com

Tower Research Capital (also known as Tower Research) is an American quantitative trading firm. Tower Research is headquartered in New York, with additional offices in Chicago, South Charleston, Montreal, London, Amsterdam, Gurgaon, GIFT City, Singapore, Hong Kong, and Shanghai.

== History ==
Tower Research Capital is one of the oldest automated trading firms. It was started by Mark Gorton and Alistair Brown in February 1998.

Tower's internal trading teams are independent from one another, enjoying autonomy while accessing shared technology resources such as hardware, software, and connectivity as well as resources such as business management, legal, compliance, and risk management. Tower is connected to more than 150 global trading venues.

Tower's quantitative trading teams are supported by a centralized engineering infrastructure responsible for market connectively, data systems, research computing, and risk management. The firm has also invested in global post-trade processing systems as its trading operations expansion.

In addition to its core quantitative trading business, Tower operates a venture capital arm, Tower Research Ventures, which invests in early-stage companies.

In August 2019, founder Mark Gorton stepped down as chief executive officer and became chairman. Albert An, who joined the firm in 2016 and served as its technology lead, succeeded him as CEO.

In 2025, Tower Research increased its investment in cryptocurrency trading through Limestone Trading, one of its internal quantitative trading teams. The firm expanded capital allocated to its crypto strategies and upgraded infrastructure to increase its role as a market maker on global cryptocurrency exchanges.

== Operations ==
Tower Research Capital is a proprietary trading firm that develops and operates automated quantitative trading strategies across global financial markets.

As of 2025, Tower employed more than 1,100 people worldwide, including quantitative researchers, software engineers, and traders.

In 2023, Tower leased a 121,903-square-foot space at 120 Broadway, consolidating its two existing New York City offices into a single office in the Equitable Building.

== Legal issues ==
In 2014 Tower Research's wholly owned subsidiary Latour Trading, which sometimes accounted for 9% of U.S. stock trading, was fined a record $16 million for violating the net capital rule. Latour deliberately mis-estimated its exposure to risk and traded despite not holding enough capital.

In 2019 Tower Research was fined $67.4 million for manipulating the markets in E-mini financial futures contracts by spoofing. Tower traders placed thousands of orders for futures contracts that it never intended to execute. Three traders were criminally charged and two pled guilty in the case. Tower subsequently settled a class-action lawsuit for $15 million.

In 2021 a suit alleging spoofing by Tower Research brought by Korean investors was decided in favor of Tower when the court ruled that trading on the Korean exchange was not subject to the U.S. Commodity Exchange Act.

== See also ==
- Headlands Technologies
