= Zeropaid.com =

News and technology website

ZeroPaid
- Website type: Technology news, software, forums and download links
- Available in: English
- Owners: Jorge A. Gonzalez, Chris Hedgecock
- Creators: Jorge A. Gonzalez, Chris Hedgecock
- Website: www.zeropaid.com
- Registration: Optional (to post on forum)
- Launched: March 2000
- Current status: Defunct

ZeroPaid.com was a website concerning news, computer software, community, and file sharing. It offered news, software reviews, links, and a user forum. Its main news staff consisted of Jared Moya since 2005 and Drew Wilson since 2007.

== History ==
ZeroPaid launched in by Jorge Gonzalez and Chris Hedgecock. ZeroPaid's early focus was on the peer-to-peer space including file sharing, Napster, Gnutella, Usenet, and BitTorrent.

Early popularity can be attributed to features like the Gnutella "server of the moment", which allowed users to connect to a node of the decentralized network. This feature has since been built into desktop clients.

ZeroPaid gained notoriety in 2000 for its "Wall of Shame" listing of IP addresses of users who allegedly attempted to download child pornography from the Gnutella P2P network. The site continues to be a source of original content and analysis. The website features interviews, including those with WinMXWorld, FilesTube, the Open Rights Group, the Pirate Party of Canada, the Free Software Foundation, Renaud Veeckman, Russell McOrmond and Michael Geist.

ZeroPaid developed into a news and technology website featuring daily news on tech and copyright, a free software catalog, and user forums. The website has been mentioned and its founders quoted in The Economist, E! News, USA Today, and Wired.

As of 2018, the website appears defunct.
