= Sergey Aleynikov =

Computer programmer

- Born: Soviet Union
- Occupation: Programmer
- Employer: Self-employed
- Website: aleynikov.org

Sergey Aleynikov (born 1970) is a former Goldman Sachs computer programmer. Between 2009 and 2016, he was prosecuted by NY Federal and State jurisdictions for the same conduct of allegedly copying proprietary computer source code from his employer, Goldman Sachs, before joining a competing firm. His first prosecution in federal court in New York ultimately resulted in acquittal by the United States Court of Appeals for the Second Circuit. The outcome of his second prosecution and trial in New York state court was a split verdict dismissed by court, which acquitted him on all counts. One count in that order of dismissal was later overturned by New York Court of Appeals, which took a very broad interpretation of the statute, and on recommendation of prosecutors he was sentenced to time served without punishment. The same New York Court of Appeals denied his petition to appeal on double jeopardy grounds. His story inspired Michael Lewis's bestseller Flash Boys.

== Career ==
Around 1990, Sergey Aleynikov emigrated from the Soviet Union to the United States. From 1998 to 2007, he worked at IDT Corporation, writing software to better handle high volumes of phone calls.

He authored a telecommunications patent and contributed to a number of open-source Erlang and C++ projects. He also published several Perl modules on CPAN.

Aleynikov was employed for two years, from May 2007 to June 2009, at Goldman at an ultimate salary of $400,000. He left to join Misha Malyshev's Teza Technologies, a competing high-frequency trading firm which offered to triple his pay.

In May 2010, Aleynikov founded Omnibius, LLC, a consulting services firm for financial clients.

== Federal prosecution and acquittal ==
On July 3, 2009, he was arrested by FBI agents at Newark Liberty International Airport after Goldman raised the alarm over a suspected policy violation reported by Goldman on July 1, 2009, two days prior to his arrest. He was accused by the FBI of improperly copying computer source code that performs "sophisticated, high-speed and high-volume trades on various stock and commodity markets", as described by Goldman. The events leading to his arrest are covered by Michael Lewis in his 2014 book Flash Boys. According to Assistant United States Attorney Joseph Facciponti, "the bank has raised the possibility that there is a danger that somebody who knew how to use this program could use it to manipulate markets in unfair ways.". Facciponti's words in the courtroom contradicted to what David Viniar, Goldman's CFO, said a few days later on the earnings call that the sustained losses would be "very, very immaterial". Aleynikov acknowledged downloading some source code, but maintained that his intent was to collect exclusively open-source software that is not proprietary to his then-employer.

On February 10, 2010, a 3-count indictment was handed down by a federal grand jury in Manhattan. The counts included theft of trade secrets (count 1), transportation of stolen goods (count 2), and illicit obtainment of data from a protected computer (count 3).

On July 16, 2010, Aleynikov moved to dismiss the indictment for failure to state an offense under any of the three statutes invoked: the Economic Espionage Act of 1996, the National Stolen Property Act, and the Computer Fraud and Abuse Act. He argued that the acts he was accused of did not constitute a crime. On September 3, 2010, the federal judge, Denise Cote, dismissed the count 3 but denied the rest of the motion.

In December 2010, Aleynikov had a jury trial in the United States District Court for the Southern District of New York. Certain trial proceedings were not public. On December 10, he was convicted of the remaining two counts, including theft of trade secrets and transportation of stolen property. Later, he was sentenced to 97 months (8 years) in prison, three years of supervised release following his prison sentence, and a $12,500 fine, despite the recommendation of the Federal Probation Service of suggesting a 24 month (2 years) sentence.

Three weeks before sentencing, Aleynikov was incarcerated on request of the government, as he was judged to be more of a flight risk after separating from his wife.

In March 2011, Aleynikov appealed the conviction, asking the Second Circuit to review the District Court's decision denying his original motion to dismiss the indictment for failure to state a claim.

On February 16, 2012, the United States Court of Appeals for the Second Circuit heard oral argument on his appeal and, later that day, unanimously ordered his conviction reversed and a judgment of acquittal entered, with opinion to follow. Aleynikov was released from custody the next morning.

On April 11, 2012, Dennis Jacobs, Chief Judge of the United States Court of Appeals, published a unanimous decision in a written opinion stating:

On appeal, Aleynikov argues, inter alia, that his conduct did not constitute an offense under either statute. He argues that: [1] the source code was not a "stolen" "good" within the meaning of the NSPA, and [2] the source code was not "related to or included in a product that is produced for or placed in interstate or foreign commerce" within the meaning of the EEA. We agree, and reverse the judgment of the district court.

By this time, Aleynikov had divorced and lost his savings. According to his lawyer, his life had been "all but ruined" as a result of his incarceration.

The government did not seek reconsideration of the Second Circuit's ruling, thus ending federal action against Aleynikov.

Later, on December 18, 2012, the Congress enhanced the 1996 Economic Espionage Act, in order to cover similar acts in future rulings, in a law referred to as the "Theft of trade secrets clarification act of 2012".

== NY State prosecution ==
=== Arrest, trial, and acquittal ===
On August 9, 2012, Aleynikov was re-arrested and charged by Manhattan District Attorney Cyrus Vance, Jr., on behalf of New York State, with "unlawful use of secret scientific material" (2 counts) and "unlawful duplication of computer-related material" (1 count) based on the same conduct. The state prosecution was initiated based on a complaint signed by the same federal agent, Michael McSwain, who led the investigation underlying the failed federal prosecution. Aleynikov's lawyer, Kevin Marino, accused Goldman Sachs of being behind the government's aggressive prosecution. Marino sharply criticized the Manhattan District Attorney's office for charging Aleynikov after his federal conviction had been overturned and he had already served a year in prison:

[My client] left Russia for freedom and the American way, and he got Franz Kafka and Goldman Sachs.

On September 27, 2012, Aleynikov pleaded not guilty to all state charges and rejected the prosecutors' plea offer of accepting a single count offense and serving no jail time. On April 5, 2013, Aleynikov lost his motion to dismiss based on double jeopardy. In rendering the decision, New York State Supreme Court Justice Ronald Zweibel stated that Aleynikov's acquittal in federal court only precluded the federal government from retrying Aleynikov. The state of New York, as a separate sovereign, could continue pursuing charges against him.

On June 20, 2014, upon reviewing the evidence, Justice Ronald Zweibel published a 71-page opinion in which the court ruled that the FBI "did not have probable cause to arrest defendant, let alone search him or his home." The arrest was "illegal", and Aleynikov's "Fourth Amendment rights were violated as a result of a mistake of law." Besides finding that he was arrested illegally without probable cause, the court excluded the majority of evidence passed by the FBI to state prosecutors, as that property was supposed to be returned to Mr. Aleynikov upon acquittal.

On May 1, 2015, following a trial before a New York state jury, he was cleared of the unlawful computer-related material duplication charge but found guilty of one count of unlawfully using secret scientific material. The jury deadlocked on the third count. On July 6, 2015, Justice Daniel P. Conviser dismissed the two remaining charges finding that, as a matter of law, Aleynikov did not violate the statute, and no rational jury could convict him of those charges. In his opinion, he wrote:

The Court holds that, viewing the evidence in a light most favorable to the People, the prosecution did not prove the Defendant made a "tangible reproduction or representation" of secret scientific material as required by the statute. The Court also holds, again under the same evidentiary standard, that the People did not demonstrate Aleynikov had the "intent to appropriate ... the use of secret scientific material" as required by the law. Defendants cannot be convicted of crimes because we believe as a matter of policy that their conduct warrants prosecution.

The statute criminalizing unlawful use of secret scientific material was enacted in 1967 but rarely utilized. The word "tangible" had never been defined by the New York Penal Law or in any reported court decision involving that statute. The one reported decision in which the statute did receive legal scrutiny — People v Russo (131 Misc 2d 677 [Suffolk County Ct 1986, Copertino, J.]) — was not informative with respect to the issues here.

=== NY State Appeal ===
On April 4, 2016, almost nine months after Aleynikov was acquitted by the NY Supreme Court, the Manhattan District Attorney Cyrus Vance's office filed an appeal seeking to reinstate the guilty verdict, arguing that

No sensible reading of the word 'tangible' supports the trial court's misguided view that the Unlawful Use statute proscribes only the creation of paper copies of secret scientific material. Even assuming the word is given its narrowest possible definition, 'perceptible to the touch,' [...] a digital reproduction of data is no less tangible than a paper copy. Computer code, in its essence, is intellectual property, just like a song or a formula. When intellectual property is written on paper, it is no more 'perceptible to the touch' than it is when written onto a hard drive. In neither case can a person 'touch' the intellectual property. In both scenarios, however, a person can touch the medium onto which the property is reproduced or recorded. This is true whether information is inscribed on a tablet, written on paper, saved onto a hard drive, or photographed with a digital camera. In each instance, the information is reproduced in a manner that gives it physical existence – in other words, a tangible reproduction or representation.

Defense attorney Kevin Marino denounced Mr. Vance's actions:

To re-prosecute Sergey Aleynikov – who was acquitted of all federal charges after spending a year in prison – was reprehensible; to file this baseless appeal eight months after Mr. Aleynikov was likewise acquitted of all state charges is truly inexcusable. Is no one watching how Mr. Vance spends the taxpayers' money?

On January 24, 2017, Aleynikov's conviction was reinstated by the First Department of the Appellate Division of the New York Supreme Court. The appellate court found the trial court's reasoning—that an electronic copy of the code was not a "tangible" reproduction—made "little sense," as a compact disc and a thumb drive are both "unquestionably tangible." The appellate court also found that the trial court erred in concluding that Aleynikov lacked "intent to appropriate," holding that the evidence "permits a rational inference that defendant intended to exercise permanent control over the use of Goldman's source code, as opposed to a short-term borrowing." Aleynikov's lawyer has stated that he will seek "immediate leave to appeal" the decision.

In the opinion on the 330.30 motion, the trial court's judge criticized decision of the appellate court:

Even were the proper construction of the word "tangible" a close call, however, this Court believed the Rule of Lenity compelled the dismissal of the charges here. "If two constructions of a criminal statute are plausible, the one more favorable to the defendant should be adopted ... " People v. Golb, 23 N.Y.3d 455, 468, 991 N.Y.S.2d 792, 15 N.E.3d 805 (2014). ... Neither the First Department nor the New York Court of Appeals mentioned the Rule of Lenity or any equivalent doctrine in their decisions.

On April 20, 2017 New York Court of Appeals granted Aleynikov's motion to appeal the reversal decision of the intermediate New York's appellate court. The New York Court of Appeals affirmed the decision of the Appellate Division on May 3, 2018, and he was sentenced to time served. Aleynikov's lawyer, Kevin Marino, criticized the conviction, and indicated that he will appeal the outcome:

Mr. Aleynikov was twice placed in jeopardy for the same offense. He was acquitted in federal court because the source code copy he made was not tangible and convicted in state court because it was tangible. That’s double jeopardy. And if they were going to ask for time served, why did they waste six years and millions of taxpayer dollars pursuing this case? It is an appalling abuse of power by an office becoming well-known for it.

== Malicious prosecution lawsuit ==
Aleynikov sued the FBI agents who arrested him for malicious prosecution. The judge dismissed the case with respect to Aleynikov's federal prosecution, finding that the agents were warranted in believing that Aleynikov had violated the National Stolen Property Act and the Economic Espionage Act. Aleynikov's malicious prosecution claims in connection with his prosecution in New York state court were stayed pending the District Attorney's appeal of the New York trial court's decision to set aside his conviction.

== See also ==
- United States v. Agrawal
