= Flash Boys =

2014 book by Michael Lewis

Flash Boys: A Wall Street Revolt
- Hardcover edition
- Author: Michael Lewis
- Language: English
- Subject: High-frequency trading
- Genre: non-fiction
- Publisher: W. W. Norton & Company
- Publication date: March 31, 2014
- Publication place: United States
- Media type: Print, e-book. audiobook
- Pages: 288 pp.
- ISBN: 9780393244663
- Preceded by: Boomerang

Flash Boys: A Wall Street Revolt is a book by the American writer Michael Lewis, published by W. W. Norton & Company on March 31, 2014. The book is a non-fiction investigation into the phenomenon of high-frequency trading (HFT) in the US financial market, with the author interviewing and collecting the experiences of several individuals working on Wall Street. Lewis concludes that HFT is used as a method to front run orders placed by investors. He goes further to suggest that broad technological changes and unethical trading practices have transformed the U.S. stock market from "the world's most public, most democratic, financial market" into a "rigged" market.

== Synopsis ==
Flash Boys maintains a primary focus on Brad Katsuyama and other central figures in the genesis and early days of IEX, the Investors' Exchange. Sergey Aleynikov, a former programmer for Goldman Sachs, serves as a secondary focus.

The introduction begins by naming Aleynikov and describing his arrest, along with the author's personal history on Wall Street, as the impetus for writing the book. The first chapter tells the story of a $300 million project from Spread Networks that was underway in mid-2009—the construction of an 827-mile (1,331 km) fiber-optic cable that cuts straight through mountains and rivers from Chicago to New Jersey—with the sole objective of reducing the transmission time for data from 17 to 13 milliseconds between the Chicago Mercantile Exchange and Nasdaq. (The construction of the line was dramatized in the 2018 film The Hummingbird Project.)

Lewis goes on to describe the modern world of electronic trading and how it differs from the past—when trading was mostly performed in open outcry pits on physical trading floors—and how that change has impacted the market. The speed of data is a major theme in the book; the faster a market participant's computer system can receive and act on data, the better their edge, and opportunity to profit, with even nanoseconds making a difference.

The central story details financial executive Brad Katsuyama's discovery of how access to this fiber-optic cable—as well as other technologies and special arrangements between HFT firms, exchanges, and large Wall Street banks—presents an opportunity for those insider institutions to profit at the expense of retail investors. To counter this, Katsuyama bands together a team that sets out to develop a new exchange, called IEX, designed specifically to prevent the unfair advantage enjoyed by HFT firms in the rest of the market.

The final chapter is dedicated to the tribulation of Sergey Aleynikov, a former Goldman Sachs programmer twice prosecuted and twice acquitted for a single act of allegedly copying proprietary computer source code from his employer before joining a competing firm.

The epilogue details the author's bicycle journey to observe a string of microwave towers along the same stretch as Spread Networks' fiber-optic line. Lewis notes that the time to send a signal from Chicago to New York and back by microwave signal is about 4.5 milliseconds less than to send it by optical fiber but, when Spread Networks was laying its line, the conventional wisdom was that microwave transmission's data capacity was too limited and unreliable due to sensitivity to inclement weather. "But what if microwave technology improved?," the author wondered. The story ends as the author climbs up a mountain summit where one of the towers is stationed. He notes the tower showed signs of age, and could have been erected some time ago, for some other purpose, but the ancillary equipment including a generator, a concrete bunker, and repeaters that amplify financial signals, were all new.

== Critical response ==
The book has drawn criticism from some academics and industry experts, particularly on Lewis's views on HFT and other claimed factual inaccuracies in its description of trading strategies. Other critics have praised Lewis's explanations of trading concepts and concurred in his criticisms of HFT. However, it is suggested that he neglected to pay attention to the larger issue of financial regulation, and excessively simplified the relationships between institutions in the financial market. Some industry executives have dismissed the book as "closer to fiction". Michael Lewis responded that those who said he "got it wrong" have a financial stake in the existing system.

Manoj Narang, CEO of high-frequency trading firm Tradeworx, argued that Lewis' book is more "fiction than fact," claiming Lewis needs a primer in HFT. A review by academic blogger Scott Locklin notes that Lewis had never spoken to, nor cited, a single high-frequency trader in the book. Andrew Ross, writing in The Guardian, praised the book as an "effective exposé" but criticizes the author for arguing for the "heroism" of one group of financial insiders over another. A month later, an article in The Economist noted that Lewis's book had generated "vigorous criticism", but that there may be some merits in its liquidity concerns.

A Financial Post reviewer suggested that Lewis intentionally omitted details that point to market-stabilizing benefits of HFT: "Ironically, the Flash Crash itself was just glossed over. Could that be because the primary cause of that momentary blip lay in a confluence of regulatory mistakes and that it was many of the demonized HFTs who actually stood fast throughout and thereby ensured that the damage was a fraction of what it could have been had only the shell-shocked, traditional participants been left to respond?"

An Oxford University Press handbook chapter authored by Andreas Fleckner calls Flash Boys a readable and mostly accurate introduction into such topics as dark pools, front-running, or kickbacks. However, the article suggests that on-site trading practices are too technical for laymen, market observers, or even regulators to fully understand. The author recommends providing incentives for self-regulation rather than SEC regulation.

Felix Salmon, a financial columnist for Slate, asserted that the negative impact of high-frequency trading was restricted to "very rich" financial intermediaries, such as hedge funds. He noted that Lewis's story "needs victims" and that he portrayed several billionaire characters as victims "by pulling out every rhetorical device he can muster." In a crucial part of the book's narrative, a mutual fund manager named Rich Gates was "shocked" to find out he was paying 0.04% per trade. The reviewer noted that Gates' own mutual fund charged an average of 2.41% for "expenses" to retail investors. He did not, however, consider that Gates' fund traded over 2 billion shares in the fiscal year that the test trade was made.

== Impact and aftermath ==
In April 2014 the book reached No. 1 on The New York Times Best Seller list, remaining on the top for three weeks, before being overtaken by Capital in the Twenty-First Century on May 18, 2014.

Jonathan Weil at Bloomberg suggests that the FBI's investigation into high frequency trading, a day after the book's release, was directly motivated by the book's claims.

Lewis's phrase "The market is rigged" was often referenced. The chairwoman of the Securities and Exchange Commission (SEC), Mary Jo White, stated in Congressional testimony on April 29, 2014, that U.S. financial markets "are not rigged" in response to a direct question on claims in Lewis's book.

Former New York City mayor Michael Bloomberg disputed claims made in Lewis' book on May 2, 2014, stating in a CNBC interview that "the system isn’t rigged." Arthur Levitt, adviser to high-frequency firm KCG Holdings and former SEC chairman, commented that variation exists within the group of high-speed traders that Lewis’ book describes, saying "What is missed in the book and in the general discussion of HFT is there are some HFT traders who respect the sanctity of the investor, and some who don’t."

Finance journalist Matt Levine criticised an emerging pattern of commentators using the regulatory term front-running incorrectly to refer to price discovery.

== Film ==
In April 2014, Sony Pictures acquired the film rights to the book. In June that year, it was announced that Flash Boys was to be adapted into a major motion picture, with acclaimed screenwriter/producer Aaron Sorkin penning the screenplay, and Scott Rudin and Eli Bush producing the film. The project would be a second collaboration between Sorkin and Rudin on a Lewis book adaptation, as the pair also filled the same respective roles on Moneyball.

By September 2017, the project had not appeared to make any progress, seemingly stuck in development hell. Lewis commented his thoughts as to the stumbling block to a book-to-movie adaptation during a session at the National Book Festival in Washington, D.C. During a conversation with Washington Post journalist Joel Aschenbach, Lewis stated the trouble was Hollywood won't cast "a movie with an Asian lead." (The real-life main character in Flash Boys, IEX founder Brad Katsuyama, is of Asian heritage.) Lewis stated that private emails leaked in the 2014 Sony Pictures hack revealed studio apprehension with having an Asian lead actor, as well as with an Asian character portrayed by a White actor.

In May 2018 it was announced that Sony Pictures' option for the screenplay had expired and film rights were acquired by Netflix. Ben Jacoby was named as the new screenwriter.

== See also ==
- Headlands Technologies
