= IEX =

U.S.-based stock exchange

Investors Exchange
- Type: Stock exchange
- Location: New York, New York (office), Weehawken, New Jersey (matching engine), United States
- Founded: 2012
- Owner: IEX Group, Inc.
- Key people: Brad Katsuyama (CEO); Ronan Ryan (president)
- Currency: USD
- Volume: 334 million shares/day, market share 2.4% (February 24, 2021)
- Website: iexexchange.io

The Investors Exchange (IEX; also known as the IEX Exchange) is a stock exchange in the United States. It was founded in 2012 in order to mitigate the effects of high-frequency trading (HFT). IEX was launched as a national securities exchange in September 2016. On October 24, 2017, it received regulatory approval from the U.S. Securities and Exchange Commission (SEC) to list companies. IEX listed its first public company, Interactive Brokers, on October 5, 2018. The exchange said that companies would be able to list for free for the first five years, before a flat annual rate of $50,000. On September 23, 2019, it announced it was leaving its listing business.

In September 2019, IEX announced that its co-founder and COO, John Schwall, would retire from the company by the end of 2019.

The genesis and early days of the exchange are chronicled in the 2014 book Flash Boys: A Wall Street Revolt by Michael Lewis.

== History ==
=== Founding and first trading ===
Founded in 2012 and started by Brad Katsuyama and Ronan Ryan, IEX opened for trading on October 25, 2013. The company’s offices are located at 3 World Trade Center in New York City. The matching engine is located across the Hudson River in Weehawken, New Jersey, and the initial point of presence is located in a data center in Secaucus, New Jersey. IEX's main innovation is a 38-mile (61 km) coil of optical fiber placed in front of its trading engine. This additional length of cable results in a 350 microsecond delay, referred to as a "speed bump". The round-trip delay of 0.0007 seconds is designed to negate the certain speed advantages utilized by some high-frequency traders. This method was subsequently implemented by competing stock exchange NYSE American in response to the SEC approval of IEX.

In 2020, Caisse de dépôt et placement du Québec made a strategic investment in IEX Group.

=== Federal approvals ===
The SEC approved IEX to be an exchange on June 17, 2016. The company aimed to start listing companies in 2017.

After a 13-month wait, on October 24, 2017, IEX Group Inc. received regulatory approval from the SEC to list companies. IEX said it would begin listings in early 2018, with a focus on having companies switch from other stock exchanges by undercutting the listing fees of rivals. The exchange said that companies would be able to list for free for the first five years, before a flat annual rate of $50,000. In comparison, NYSE had annual listing fees as high as $500,000 and Nasdaq up to $155,000. The Wall Street Journal wrote that the approval "paved the way for the first competition to the New York Stock Exchange and Nasdaq Inc. in nearly a decade... Companies seeking to list their shares on a U.S. exchange haven't had a choice besides NYSE or Nasdaq since 2008, when the American Stock Exchange was acquired by NYSE." Only Wynn Resorts Ltd. said publicly that it was considering a listing on IEX at the time of the approval announcement, with IEX not releasing more details on listings.

IEX won the 2025 Global Markets Choice Award for Most Innovative Exchange in June 2025.

== Exchange features ==
=== Operating principles ===
IEX was created to counter questionable trading practices prevalent on Wall Street exchanges, dark pools, and other alternative trading systems. The IEX exchange aims to attract investors by promising to "play fair" by operating in a transparent and straightforward manner, while also helping to level the playing field for traders. Strategies to achieve those goals include:

- Publishing the matching rules used in the exchange's computerized order matching engine.
- Offering a limited number of simple and familiar order types.
- Charging fixed fees on most orders (or a flat percentage rate on small orders).
- Ensuring market pricing data arrives at external points of presence simultaneously.
- Slightly delaying market pricing data to all customers (no colocation).
- Refusing to pay for order flow.

These strategies are intended to ensure the trustworthiness of the exchange. A few dark pools are owned by trading companies that pay for certain types of orders to allow them to fill orders within the pool, rather than routing orders to public exchanges. IEX offers no rebates for orders, and only charges a flat fee of $0.0009 per share on trades executed within the dark pool (or 0.30% with shares worth less than $1.00). Trades forwarded to other trading venues are charged a lower rate.

IEX has five order types: market, limit, primary peg (pegged to national best bid/offer), midpoint peg and patent-pending discretionary peg. IEX discretionary peg is a primary peg that may execute at up to midpoint price when the quote is stable. A few optional parameters can be attached to the orders, leaving IEX with many fewer order types than most other exchanges.

IEX employs a 38-mile fiber coil in New Jersey, introducing a 350μs "speed bump" that equalizes data arrival to its points of presence. Traders are not allowed to co-locate equipment adjacent to IEX's own servers, unlike many other trading platforms. IEX has its own low-latency links to other trading venues in the New York region, which it can use to execute trades for customers in under 320 microseconds. The point-of-presence links for traders to gain access to IEX have a built-in, round-trip delay of 700 microseconds from a 38-mile coil of fiber, so traders cannot beat IEX's own computers as orders propagate outward. The data delay prevents many predatory behaviors. It deters the practice of liquidity fading, where they peer into various trading venues and try to detect orders as they propagate from a broker's order router, and use this information to withdraw liquidity ahead of toxic order flow.

=== Market share (in percent) ===
(Source: IEX)

=== Broker priority ===
Before becoming an exchange, IEX operated a dark pool which did not adhere entirely to priority by price then time, unlike other U.S. trading venues. Instead, the IEX prioritized orders by price, followed by broker and, lastly, time. Katsuyama argues that this arrangement advantages regular investors contrarily to HFT firms, by preventing, for instance, HFT firms from jumping to the top of the order queue and front running normal investors.

When IEX applied for exchange status, it dropped the broker-based priority mechanism and as an exchange it gives priority to the best price first followed by the time of order submittal (as do other exchanges).

=== Liquidity ===
Michael Lewis' book, Flash Boys, focused on the new trading platform, arguing that it was better than other dark pools since it created an equal playing field for investors by slowing down trading and preventing HFT firms from front running orders. An advocacy group for high-frequency traders countered that liquidity-provider firms need speed and direct market connectivity to manage risk, and a market that limits speed, such as IEX, would be illiquid and expensive for price discovery.

== IEX Cloud ==
IEX also offered an API service, allowing developers to query US and Canadian stock data. In August 2024, IEX Cloud ceased to operate.

== Key people ==
- Brad Katsuyama (CEO)
- Ronan Ryan (president)

== See also ==
- List of stock exchanges
- List of stock exchanges in the Americas
