= Clarence Eckerson =

American videographer

Clarence Eckerson, Jr. (born 1967) is a Queens-based videographer and the creator of BikeTV and Streetfilms.org.

== Background ==
Eckerson grew up in New York State and delivered newspapers by bicycle for five years. He developed an interest in film at an early age and made many silent home movies with a Super 8 camera, using his friends and family as actors. Upon graduation from University at Albany, Eckerson went on to work for several large media companies producing video and managing sales operations. He eventually started his own company, Trorb Productions. He also became a bicycle advocate and served three years as head of Transportation Alternatives Brooklyn committee. In 2024, public data shows he was working for OpenPlans Inc. as the Director of Video Production with a salary of $112,083.

== BikeTV ==
In 2002, Eckerson created BikeTV, a cable show dedicated to showing all aspects of cycling in New York City and beyond.

== Streetfilms ==
In 2004, Eckerson started working for The Open Planning Project on the body of video work that would eventually become StreetFilms.org. StreetFilms.org is a video blog that tackles the issues of the livable streets movement in conjunction with Streetsblog, also produced by the Open Planning Project. The site now documents New York transportation and explores transportation practices around the globe. As of July 2010, Streetfilms shorts had been watched by more than 8,000,000 people.

Several other activists who make and publish videos to influence city planning policies praise Eckerson's work and claim Streetfilms as an influence.
