= Scalping (trading) =

Arbitrage or market manipulation

Scalping, when used in reference to trading in securities, commodities and foreign exchange, may refer to either

1. a legitimate method of arbitrage of small price gaps created by the bid–ask spread, or
2. a fraudulent form of market manipulation.

== Arbitrage ==
Scalping, in the arbitrage sense, is a type of trading in which traders try to open and close positions in very short periods of time in markets such as foreign exchange and securities, with the aim of making a small profit from the trades.

=== How scalping works ===
Scalping is the shortest time frame in trading and it exploits small changes in currency prices. Scalpers attempt to act like traditional market makers or specialists. To make the spread means to buy at the Bid price and sell at the Ask price, in order to gain the bid/ask difference. This procedure allows for profit even when the bid and ask don't move at all, as long as there are traders who are willing to take market prices. It normally involves establishing and liquidating a position quickly, usually within minutes or even seconds.

The role of a scalper is actually the role of market makers or specialists who are to maintain the liquidity and order flow of a product of a market.

The profit for each transaction is based only on a few bips (basis points), so scalping is typically conducted when there are large amounts of capital and high leverage or there are currency pairs where the bid–offer spread is narrow.

== Fraudulent use by adviser and social media stock promotion ==
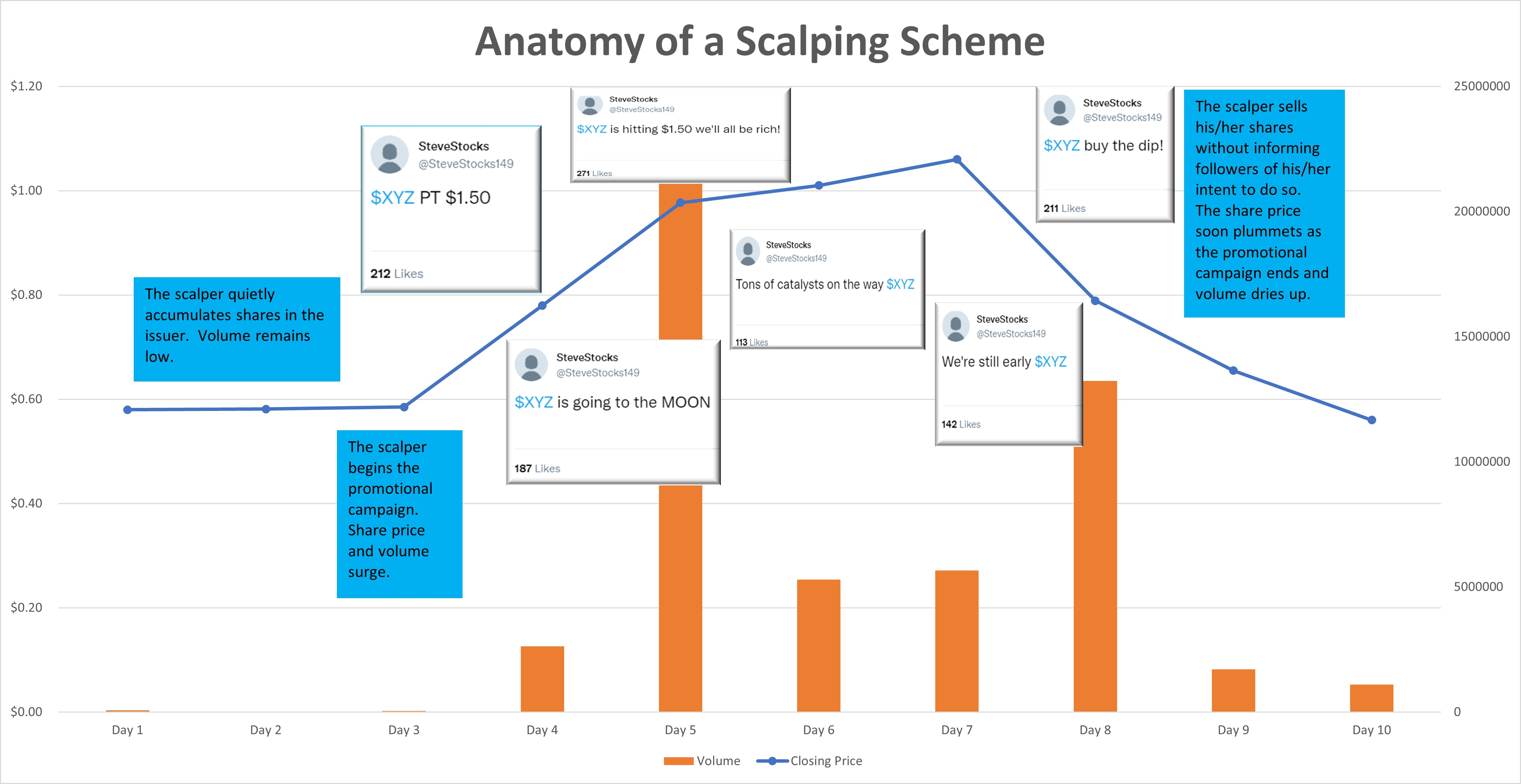
Anatomy of a Scalping Scheme

Scalping in this sense is the practice of purchasing a security for one's own account shortly before recommending that security for investment and then shortly thereafter selling the security at a profit upon the rise in the market price following the recommendation. The Supreme Court of the United States has ruled that scalping by an investment adviser operates as a fraud or deceit upon any client or prospective client and is a violation of the Investment Advisers Act of 1940. The prohibition on scalping has been applied against persons who are not registered investment advisers, and it has been ruled that scalping is also a violation of Rule 10b-5 under the Securities Exchange Act of 1934 if the scalper has a relationship of trust and confidence with the persons to whom the recommendation is made. The Securities and Exchange Commission has stated that it is committed to stamping out scalping schemes.

Scalping is analogous to front running, a similar improper practice by broker-dealers. It is also similar to but differs from conventional pumping and dumping, which usually does not involve a relationship of trust and confidence between the fraudster and their victims. Scalping schemes involving social media stock promoters have become a significant focus of both civil and criminal enforcement in the United States in recent years as the use of Twitter and other social media networks has allowed online stock promoters to tout stocks and then sell them on their followers after their stock promotion campaigns cause a spike in the share price.
