= Tibra =

Australian proprietary trading firm

Tibra Capital Pty Limited
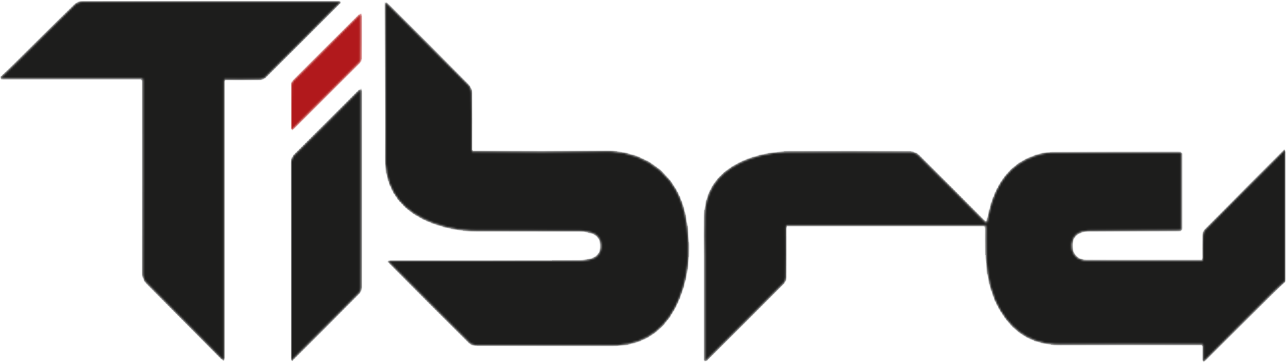
- Formerly: FTD Trading Pty Limited
- Company type: Private company
- Industry: Financial services
- Founded: January 2006; 20 years ago
- Founders: Dinesh Bhandari; Tim Berry; Glenn Williamson
- Headquarters: Austinmer, New South Wales, Australia
- Key people: Christopher Udy (CEO)
- Products: Proprietary trading Algorithmic trading High-frequency trading
- Website: www.tibra.com

Tibra Capital (Tibra) is an Australia proprietary trading firm headquartered in Austinmer, New South Wales. It has additional offices in Sydney and London.

== Background ==
Tibra was founded in January 2006 near Sydney by Dinesh Bhandari, a former trader at Optiver as well as six other employees who had also came from the same firm. Bhandari put in $2 million to start the new venture while the others contributed a total of $4 million. Originally the firm was called FTD meaning "Fuck the Dutch" in reference to the employees split with management at Optiver Sydney.

The firm quickly turned a profit with its first year making $14 million and its second year making $57 million.

In 2011, co-founders Bhandari, Glenn Williamson stepped away from day-to-day involvement with the firm to pursue personal interests.

Although the firm expanded quickly at the beginning, its business slowed for several years and the firm recorded losses. As a result, it streamlined the business and closed several overseas offices as well as cut staff numbers. Previously Tibra also had offices in Amsterdam, Dubai, Chicago, Hong Kong and Singapore.

Tibra uses a mix of statistical and fundamental analysis to drive its investment strategies in trading, arbitrage and market making.

== Legal disputes ==
=== Optiver ===
Tibra's co-founders were previously employees of Optiver. In June 2007, Optiver started proceeds against Tibra. In August 2009, Optiver launched a legal lawsuit Tibra and its co-founders. It alleged they had used confidential information for Tibra's computer trading programs. As a result, it was suing for copyright infringement and damage caused by using its software. It also was claiming a proportion of profits made by Tibra. The Australian stated Optiver launched the lawsuit after private investigators tracked emails sent by the co-founders on the day they left the firm. One claim states how, in 2004, Optiver employees wrote programming code to improve its trading speed from 80 milliseconds to between 0.5 and 1.5 milliseconds. In 2005, Optiver 'terminated' Bhandari's employment. By mid 2006, several Optiver employees quit to join Bhandari at Tibra. Optiver head, Robert Keldoulis was suspicious on how fast Tibra became a successful competitor.

In January 2014, Tibra settled with Optiver with no admission of fault. Williamson was the sole co-founder who refused to sign a settlement agreement with Optiver stating even though the settlement is officially without admission of fault, accepting it can still be seen as a sign of guilt.

=== KCG Holdings ===
In November 2012, Tibra hired two former executives from GETCO Europe with one being considered a "game-changing" hire. In June 2013, GETCO and Knight Capital Group merged to form KCG Holdings. KCG Holdings then launched a lawsuit against Tibra alleging "breach of certain intellectual property and confidentiality rights by an employee". In June 2015, Tibra and KCG Holdings agreed to an out-of-court settlement.
