= Follow This (organisation) =

Dutch climate-focused activist group

- Logo of Follow This
- Formation: 2015
- Founder: Mark van Baal
- Type: Non-profit
- Legal status: ANBI
- Purpose: Climate-focused shareholder activism in the oil and gas industry
- Headquarters: Amsterdam, Netherlands
- Region served: International
- Website: www.follow-this.org

Follow This is a Dutch non-profit and shareholder advocacy group that engages investors to submit climate-related shareholder resolutions at the annual general meetings of oil and gas companies. The organization calls on companies to align their climate policies with the targets of the Paris Agreement.

== History ==
Follow This was founded in 2015 by Mark van Baal, a former energy journalist and shareholder activist. The organization emerged from concerns over the role of oil companies and the financial sector in the climate crisis. Using its rights as a minority shareholder, Follow This began submitting climate-related resolutions at the annual general meetings (AGMs) of major oil and gas companies, with the stated goal of influencing climate policies.

Support grew when international institutional investors began backing these resolutions, such as in 2021 when approximately 60% of Chevron shareholders backed a resolution filed by Follow This. This urged the company to align its emissions reduction targets with the Paris Agreement. This support was part of a broader trend in which shareholder pressure led oil and gas companies to ramp up their climate ambitions.

In 2025, Follow This announced a pause in its shareholder resolution campaign, citing a lack of investor support and increasing legal and political challenges, particularly in the United States. Despite this pause, the organization remains committed to advocating for climate action within the oil and gas industry.

== Operations ==
Follow This is based in the Netherlands, with a member base of several thousands of people. Since 2021, it has been recognized by the Dutch Tax and Customs Administration as an official charitable organization (ANBI). Funding mainly comes from philanthropic contributions and is supplemented by membership fees and donations from supporters.

== Impact ==
=== Oil company emission reductions ===
In 2018, Follow This proposed a series of resolutions to Shell which, if supported by 75% of shareholders, would have required the company to take aggressive climate action. Though the resolutions did not pass, Shell later announced emissions-reduction commitments.

After this, Follow This bought a small number of shares to force the company to set lower emission standards, ExxonMobil sued, and Follow This dropped the resolution. Some institutional investors collaborated with Follow This, co-filing resolutions at Shell in 2024.

== Exxon anti-ESG backlash ==
Follow This encountered a major legal conflict in early 2024, when ExxonMobil filed a lawsuit in Texas federal court against Follow This and Arjuna Capital, aiming to block a shareholder resolution on greenhouse gas emissions. Amid a backlash against ESG proposals, Exxon pursued this litigation after the groups withdrew their proposal, arguing the matter could recur and seeking to restrict future filings through court orders.

The move sparked widespread investor outrage. Leading institutional shareholders, including CalPERS and Norges Bank Investment Management denounced Exxon for undermining shareholder rights. CalPERS announced plans to vote against Exxon's entire board in protest, calling the lawsuit “reckless” and “designed to punish two small groups that dared to speak truth to power”. Norges Bank publicly opposed the re-election of Exxon director Joseph Hooley, citing concern over the company's “unusual and aggressive tactics”. Dozens of asset owners issued statements defending shareholder democracy and urging reliance on SEC processes as the proper mechanism for resolving proxy disputes.

In June 2024, the court dismissed the case against Follow This on jurisdictional grounds, and the case against Arjuna Capital was dropped after the firm committed not to refile the proposal. Follow This welcomed the ruling, warning the lawsuit could have set a dangerous precedent for future climate-focused shareholder activism.

In 2025, Follow This did not file a climate resolution for the first time since 2016. The decision was attributed to legal and political pressure in the United States, including state-level actions against ESG policies by American investors. Despite not filing a resolution, Follow This rallied 24% of BP shareholders to vote against the re-election of BP's chairman after a reversal in the oil company's climate strategy.
