= Imre Vallyon =

New Zealand writer

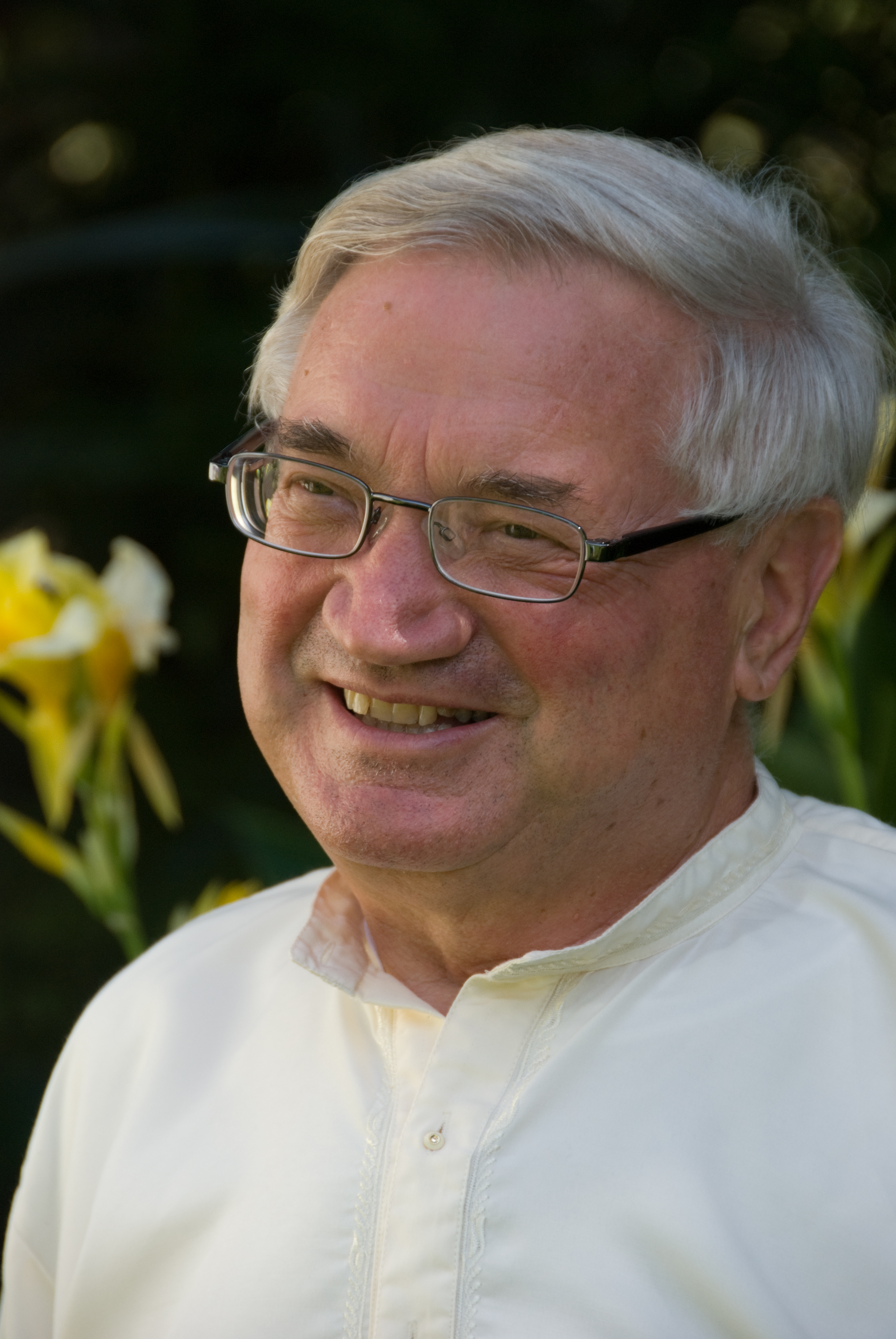
- Vallyon in 2009
- Born: 7 December 1940 (age 85); Budapest, Hungary
- Occupations: Author, spiritual teacher
- Writing career
- Notable awards: Ashton Wylie Charitable Trust Book Award; 2008 Heavens and Hells of the Mind
- Website: www.imrevallyon.co.nz

Imre George Vallyon (Hungarian: Vallyon Imre, born 7 December 1940) is a Hungarian-New Zealand writer, and spiritual influencer. In 1998, he was found guilty on several accounts of sexual child molestation of a girl who had come to him to seek spiritual guidance about a dead relative. Vallyon was sentenced to three years imprisonment.

Vallyon is the founder of the Foundation for Higher Learning, an international spiritual school formed to help provide people with the opportunity to practice spiritual work within a group environment, with schools in New Zealand, Australia, Germany, Switzerland, Hungary, and Canada. He is also the director of Sounding-Light Publishing, which was founded in 2006. Vallyon retired in late 2017.

== Early life ==
Vallyon was born in Budapest, Hungary. Vallyon claims to have had his first mystical experience at the age of three, describing the memory as suddenly going "out of my body and into a very profound state of cosmic realization...the whole universe was vibrating like a heavenly choir."

In the midst of the 1956 Hungarian Revolution, Vallyon made the dangerous choice to leave the country; crossing the border at the time usually meant imprisonment or death. At the age of sixteen, he emigrated to New Zealand as a refugee.

== Career ==
After immersing himself in several spiritual movements, Vallyon founded the Foundation for Higher Learning, where he teaches the Spiritual Principles and the Divine Laws of Life to Humanity. His methods stem from different forms of eastern and western spirituality. His teaching is universal, not biased towards any particular religion or tradition, yet embraces all traditions and points beyond them all to the One Truth, One Life, One Reality.

Since 1980, Vallyon has taught the Ageless Wisdom through his writings, workshops, and retreats conducted around the world. Since 2008, Vallyon was invited and has been a member of the New Zealand Society of Authors.

In 2008, Vallyon won a literature prize at the annual nationwide Ashton Wylie Charitable Trust Unpublished Manuscript and Book Awards for his book Heavens and Hells of the Mind. The awards recognise excellence in the mind, body, and spirit genres of writing. The judges called the book "a remarkable and exhaustive work on human consciousness and the wisdom of the ages."

In 2009, Vallyon's book series Heavens & Hells of the Mind received the gold medal in the category of Enlightenment/Spirituality at the Living Now Book Awards.

He also held worldwide retreats in countries including the Netherlands, Germany, Switzerland, Australia, Canada, and Hungary.

== Teachings ==
Vallyon's teachings are influenced by spiritual traditions such as yoga, Zen Buddhism, Sufism, Catholicism, and mysticism.

== Conviction and imprisonment ==
In 1998, Vallyon was tried and convicted in New Zealand for sexually molesting a child. Vallyon was convicted of four representative counts of indecent assault and one count of sexually violating the girl by Hamilton District Court Judge David Wilson QC. He was sentenced to three years imprisonment. On 26 February 2017, the Sunday Star-Times, released an investigative report exposing Vallyon's crimes.

=== New accusations ===
On 4 February 2020, the news division of the Dutch broadcasting agency NOS released an investigative news report on Vallyon as a result of a breakup between the Dutch Foundation for Higher Learning and the International group. The report states that several new victims had come forward, one of them being only 6 years old during the abuse. The article also says the Dutch Tax Authority has asked questions about illegal use of the ANBI status by Vallyon. Court records also indicate that Vallyon had prior offenses dating back to 1978. The presiding judge remarked on the lack of detailed information about these earlier incidents, stating that no one could provide specifics about their nature or extent.

== Retirement ==
In December 2017, after 30 years of teaching at retreats, Vallyon retired at the age of 77.

== Awards ==
- "Heavens and Hells of the Mind", 2009 Gold Medal in the Enlightenment/Spirituality Category of the Living Now Book Awards
- "Heavens and Hells of the Mind", 2008 Ashton Wylie Charitable Trust Book Award

== Published works ==
=== Books ===
Year	Title	ISBN	Language
1990	The Magical Mind	9780909038-11-3	English
2005	The Divine Plan	9780909038-53-3	English
2005	The Sedona Talks	9780909038-54-0	English
2005	Heart to Heart Talks	9780909038-55-7	English
2007	The Art of Meditation	9780909038-56-4	English
2008	Heavens and Hells of the Mind (Four volume boxed set)	9780909038-30-4	English
2008	Heavens and Hells of the Mind (Volume 1: Knowledge)	9780909038-31-1	English
2008	Heavens and Hells of the Mind (Volume 2: Tradition)	9780909038-32-8	English
2008	Heavens and Hells of the Mind (Volume 3: Transformation)	9780909038-33-5	English
2008	Heavens and Hells of the Mind (Volume 4: Lexicon)	9780909038-34-2	English
2009	A Spirituális Harcos	9780909038-57-1	Hungarian
2009	Le Chemin du Guerrier Spirituel	9780909038-58-8	French
2010	Les Conférences de Sedona	9780909038-59-5	French
2010	l'Art de la Méditation	9780909038-60-1	French
2010	Planetary Transformation	9780909038-61-8	English
2010	Felkészülés az Új Korra	9780909038-62-5	Hungarian
2011	De Kunst van Meditatie	9780909038-63-2	Netherlands
2011	The Warrior Code	9780909038-64-9	English
2012	The New Planetary Reality	9780909038-65-6	English
2012	De Code van de Krijger	9780909038-66-3	Netherlands
2014	The New Heaven & the New Earth	9780909038687	English
2014	Il Camino Del Guerriero Spirituale	9780909038670	Italian
2015	The Journey Within	9780909038-70-0	English
2016	The Way of the Spiritual Warrior	9780909038-49-6	English

=== Ebooks ===
Year	Title	ISBN	Language
2012	Why Meditate?	9780909038-91-5	English
2012	The Mystery of Death	9780909038-92-2	English
2012	Know Your Own Mind	9780909038-94-6	English
2012	The Beatitudes	9780909038-95-3	English
2012	Planetary Transformation	9780909038-90-8	English
2012	Peace of Mind in a Troubled World	9780909038-89-2	English
2012	The Coming Avatara	9780909038-93-9	English
2012	Silence	9780909038-96-0	English
2012	Love and Wisdom	9780909038-98-4	English
2013	Karma	9780909038-97-7	English
2013	The New Planetary Reality	9780909038-88-5	English
2013	The Sedona Talks	9780909038-85-4	English
2013	The Art of Meditation	9780909038-86-1	English
2013	The Warrior Code	9780909038-87-8	English
2014	Living The Spiritual Life Today	9780909038-99-1	English
2014	What You Need For The Journey You Already Have Within You	9780909038-21-2	English
2014	Daily Meditations	9780909038-22-9	English
2014	Finding True Happiness	9780909038-20-5	English
2014	The New Heaven and the New Earth	9780909038-84-7	English
2014	¿Por Qué Meditar?	9780909038-18-2	Spanish
2014	Shadowland	9780909038-23-6	English
2015	The Divine Plan And The Destiny Of Mankind	9780909038-83-0	English
2015	God The Mother	9780909038-24-3	English
2015	Enseignements De Cœur À Cœur	9780909038-48-9	French
2016	The Way of the Spiritual Warrior	9780909038-17-5	English

=== Music ===
Year	Title	ISBN
2006	Chants of Illumination 1: Sanskrit Mantras to the Light	9780909038-73-1
2007	Chants of Illumination 2: Sanskrit Mantras to the Divine Mother	9780909038-74-8
2010	Chants of Illumination 3: Sanskrit Mantras to the Heart	9780909038-75-5
