= TransMarket Group =

American financial trading firm

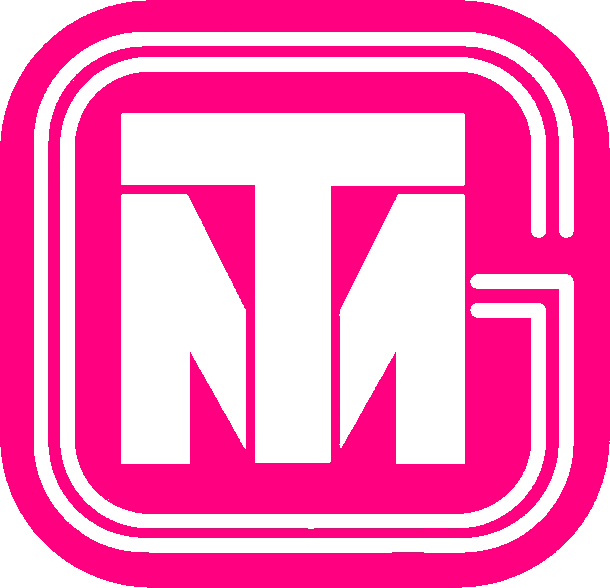
- Formerly: Aardvark Financial Inc.
- Type: Privately held company
- Industry: Finance/ Trading
- Founded: 1980
- Founder: Ray Cahnman
- Headquarters: Chicago, Illinois, USA
- Key people: Doug Adams (CEO)
- Website: www.transmarketgroup.com

TransMarket Group (TMG) is a privately held quantitative proprietary trading firm based in Chicago with additional offices in Puerto Rico and Switzerland.

== Description ==
TMG was founded in 1980 by Ray Cahnman, a former floor trader, and has roughly 150 employees including interns. The firm's primary business is as an electronic market maker in a diverse group of assets including commodities, government debt, currencies, and interest rates.

TMG has been a major player in the markets since its founding and pioneered bond futures basis arbitrage at the inception of the Chicago Board of Trade (CBOT) Treasury futures contracts.

== History ==
=== 1980-Current ===
- 1980 - TMG was founded as Aardvark Financial Inc.
- 1981 - Aardvark Financial became a clearing member of the Chicago Mercantile Exchange. Shortly thereafter, they began providing clearing services for their clients.
- 1984 - Aardvark Financial changed its name to TransMarket Group.
- 2001 - TMG sold their clearing business to Fortis (now BNP Paribas Fortis), which is now a major subsidiary of BNP Paribas.
- 2002 - TMG acquired the futures broking division of Traderspace Limited (TSL) after which TMG divided their existing Australian business operations with their proprietary trading operation continuing under the TMG brand and the combined TMG and TSL Futures Broking Business becoming BrokerOne. TMG was for a time in the top quartile of brokerage houses as measured by volume on the Chicago futures exchanges.
- 2006 - TMG created Aardvark Trading LLC to serve as TMG's algorithmic trading subsidiary.
- 2007 - MF Global acquired BrokerOne, a leading Australian Futures Broker. Prior to this acquisition, the controlling shareholder was TransMarket Group. TransMarket Group began shifting its entire business to its "arcade" proprietary trading business.
- 2010 - TMG's subsidiary Aardvark Trading and TMG’s domestic “arcade” operation agreed to merge operations. The merger integration between TMG domestic and Aardvark has largely been completed and resulted in the shift of TMG’s core business to team based model driven proprietary trading, though a small independent trading operation still remains. TMG’s previous international operations are being divested.

== Leadership ==
Ray Cahnman, Founder, Chairman (US Interest Rates Trading)

Ray Cahnman began his trading career at the Chicago Board of Trade in October 1975. He became the first independent trader to trade financial products at Shatkin Trading Company, which led to a partnership to arbitrage US Treasury cash/futures. In 1980, he established Aardvark Financial, a CBOT clearing firm. Aardvark Financial became a clearing member of the Chicago Mercantile Exchange in 1981. The firm was renamed TransMarket Group in 1984. He qualified as an independent floor trader on London International Financial Futures Exchange and Sydney Futures Exchange in 1989. From 1999-2002 Mr. Cahnman was a Director of the Chicago Board of Trade. Mr. Cahnman has trained many highly successful traders over his career. Ray continues to actively trade and manages the firm’s US interest rates strategy. Mr. Cahnman holds a Bachelor of Science degree in Mathematics from DePaul University and a Master of Business Administration degree from Tulane University.
