= Income tax in the Netherlands =

Form of taxation in the Netherlands

Income tax in the Netherlands (personal, rather than corporate) is regulated by the Wet inkomstenbelasting 2001 (Income Tax Law, 2001).

The fiscal year is the same as the calendar year. Before May 1 citizens have to report their income from the previous year. The system integrates the income tax with fees paid for the general old age pension system (AOW), the pension system for partners of deceased people (ANW), and the national insurance system for special medical care (WLZ).

There are three categories of income, each with their own tax rates. They are referred to as "boxes".

== Progressive tax on wages etc. (box 1) ==
There is a progressive tax on wages, social security benefits and pensions. Thus there are tax brackets, each with its own tax rate. Mathematically, apart from discretization (whole euros both for income and for tax), the tax is a continuous, convex, piecewise linear function of income.

Year	Box 1 Tax Rate Brackets (2010–present, under pension age)			
2026	€0 – €38,883		€38,883 – €79,137	over €79,137
2026	35.70% (8.05% + 27.65%)		37.56%	49.50%
2025	€0 – €38,441		€38,441 – €76,816	over €76,816
2025	35.82% (8.17% + 27.65%)		37.48%	49.50%
2024	€0 – €38,098		€38,099 – €75,518	over €75,518
2024	36.97% (9.32% + 27.65%)		36.97%	49.50%
2023	€0 – €37,149		€37,150 – €73,031	over €73,031
2023	36.93% (9.28% + 27.65%)		36.93%	49.50%
2022	€0 – €35,472		€35,473 – €69,398	over €69,398
2022	37.07% (9.42% + 27.65%)		37.07%	49.50%
2021	€0 – €35,129		€35,130 – €68,507	over €68,507
2021	37.10% (9.45% + 27.65%)		37.10%	49.50%
2020	€0 – €34,712		€34,713 – €68,507	over €68,507
2020	37.35% (9.70% + 27.65%)		37.35%	49.50%
2019	€0 – €20,384	€20,385 – €34,300	€34,301 – €68,507	over €68,507
2019	36.65% (9.00% + 27.65%)	38.10% (10.45% + 27.65%)	38.10%	51.75%
2018	€0 – €20,142	€20,143 – €33,994	€33,995 – €68,507	over €68,507
2018	36.55% (8.90% + 27.65%)	40.80% (13.15% + 27.65%)	40.80%	51.95%
2017	€0 – €19,982	€19,983 – €33,792	€33,793 – €67,072	over €67,072
2017	36.55% (8.90% + 27.65%)	40.80% (13.15% + 27.65%)	40.85%	51.95%
2016	€0 – €19,922	€19,923 – €33,715	€33,716 – €66,421	over €66,421
2016	36.55% (8.40% + 28.15%)	40.40% (12.25% + 28.15%)	40.40%	52.00%
2015	€0 – €19,822	€19,823 – €33,589	€33,590 – €57,585	over €57,585
2015	36.50% (8.35% + 28.15%)	42.00% (13.85% + 28.15%)	42.00%	52.00%
2014	€0 – €19,645	€19,646 – €33,363	€33,364 – €56,531	over €56,531
2014	36.25% (8.10% + 28.15%)	42.00% (13.85% + 28.15%)	42.00%	52.00%
2013	€0 – €19,645	€19,646 – €33,363	€33,364 – €55,911	over €55,911
2013	37.00% (5.85% + 31.15%)	42.00% (10.85% + 31.15%)	42.00%	52.00%
2012	€0 – €18,945	€18,946 – €33,864	€33,865 – €56,491	over €56,491
2012	33.10% (1.95% + 31.15%)	41.95% (10.80% + 31.15%)	42.00%	52.00%
2011	€0 – €18,628	€18,629 – €33,436	€33,437 – €55,694	over €55,694
2011	33.00% (1.85% + 31.15%)	41.95% (10.80% + 31.15%)	42.00%	52.00%
2010	€0 – €18,218	€18,219 – €32,738	€32,739 – €54,367	over €54,367
2010	33.45% (2.30% + 31.15%)	41.95% (10.80% + 31.15%)	42.00%	52.00%

For people above the pension age, the social security component is reduced. Additionally, there are income-dependent deductions and tax credits for incomes up to €90,710 which decrease the effective tax rate.

Under certain conditions a life annuity is treated as a pension: premiums are deducted from the income, the benefits are taxed, and the scheme is not counted as asset in box 3. The conditions concern the type of life annuity and the necessity, based on the principle that the higher the income is, the more pension plus life annuity one needs to build up for the future, up to a maximum.

For the value of an owner-occupied dwelling and for mortgage debt related to that, this box and not box 3 applies. Based on the value of the dwelling, a "fixed rentable value" is counted, while interest for the mortgage is deductible. This is an important factor, since interest on a mortgage can easily be over a thousands euros per month, which is subtracted from income before any income tax is applied. If the value of an owner-occupied dwelling would be positive (fixed rentable value is greater than interest) it is changed to zero.

For taxpayers above the official retirement age reduced rates apply for the first two brackets. In 2019, the corresponding tax rates are 18.75% and 20.20%. The discount of 17.9% of the income in these brackets corresponds to the AOW contributions, which are not owed by the AOW beneficiaries. In 2018, the retirement age in the Netherlands was postponed from 65 years and 9 months to 66 years.

For employed and self-employed people there is an employment rebate.

The wage withholding tax is a deduction of wages, social security benefits and pensions, as an advance payment for the income tax, paid through the employer, etc.

See also box 1 (in Dutch).

=== Health insurance premium ===
From 2006 there is a new national health insurance scheme (zorgverzekering(swet), Zvw). The premium is partly income-dependent and paid as a tax supplement. It applies for the "contribution income" (bijdrage-inkomen), which is part of box 1, including labor income, social security benefits, pensions, and life annuities (it does not include the "owner-occupied dwelling income"). It is withheld if the wage withholding tax applies. The rate is 7.1% for e.g. wages and 5% for e.g. life annuities, coming on top of the tax percentages mentioned above. The total income for which these rates apply is limited to ca. 50,000 euro.

== Tax on income from a substantial business interest (box 2) ==
Prior to 2024, there was a flat tax of 26.9% on income from a substantial business interest, usually meaning a (direct or indirect) shareholding of at least 5% in a private limited company (BV). As of 2024, this has become a two-bracketed tax consisting of a rate of 24.5% on the first €67,000 of income and 33% on the excess.

If the fiscal partner of the taxpayer or a blood relative (first vertical kin) holds a substantial interest in a company, the shares of the taxpayer constitute a substantial interest, even if they do not amount to 5%.

Income from substantial interest includes:

- dividends
- capital gains (except in case of succession and divorce)

For 2007 only there was a reduced rate ranging from 22 to 25%.

See also box 2 (in Dutch).

== Tax on savings and investments (box 3) ==
As of 2024, there is a tax of 36% on the assumed return on bank savings and other assets if their total value exceeds €57,000. Each type of investment has a different assumed rate of return associated with it.

There is an exemption for money invested in approved "green" investments up to a certain limit. Moreover, a tax credit per year of 0.7% of the value is applied for these investments. The credit only counts towards box 3.

See also box 3 (in Dutch).

== Threshold income ==
The sum of the incomes in the three boxes is the "threshold income". It determines thresholds for tax deductions, e.g. for gifts (see below).

The deductible amount is subtracted from the income in box 1; if this is not enough, the remainder is subtracted from the income in box 3, and finally from box 2.

== Gifts ==
The Dutch Tax Service can declare an institution to be an "institution for general benefit" (algemeen nut beogende instelling, ANBI). Often this is a foundation (stichting). It can also be a voluntary association (vereniging), but not e.g. a sport club, or association of personnel. Also it cannot be a commercial institution.

If the sum of someone's gifts to ANBIs exceeds 1% of the threshold income, the excess, with a maximum of 10% of that income, is deductible income.

== Total tax ==
The total tax is the sum in the three boxes, minus the general tax credit (algemene heffingskorting, a maximum of €3070 as of 2023) and labor tax credit (arbeidskorting, a maximum of €5052 as of 2023) that both are income-dependent. These are not to be confused with a tax deduction). The resulting amount of tax may be less than zero, in which case the amount is partially paid out, provided that one has a spouse and the tax of both together is not less than zero.

== The 30% ruling ==
The 30% ruling is a personal income tax reduction for select employees in the Netherlands. It applies to specialized foreign employees who are brought to the Netherlands because their skills are scarce in the Dutch marketplace. The scarcity of work force with particular skills is reviewed annually. The 30 Percent Rule allows an employer to exempt from income tax up to 30% of the employee's annual remuneration (the "Basis") and used to be applicable for the first 10 years of their stay in the Netherlands, but is currently for the first five years of employment in the Netherlands Inkomstenbelasting Wet 2001.

The purpose of the 30 Percent Rule to compensate employees for the extra costs of their temporary stay in the Netherlands. The effect is to make the Netherlands competitive in the international marketplace for skilled labour, since normal Dutch income tax rates are high (in comparison with other countries) and may discourage some employees from accepting assignments in the Netherlands.

However, there are consequences for possible future unemployment aid, tax deduction for a mortgage, pension contributions, and other benefits.

The Dutch tax authority allows for two options:

- 30% tax-free is reimbursed based on registered receipts for extraterritorial costs (e.g. maintenance of an own house in the country of origin, travel expenses, relocation costs, language courses, long-distance telephone calls)
- the Dutch tax office can, upon an approved application of an employee, grant a 30% tax exemption on the employees remuneration.

In addition, the employer may provide a tax-free reimbursement for tuition fees when the employee's children attend an international school.

The Dutch income tax law does not, however, specify how the benefit of the 30% rule should be divided between the employee and the employer. Some employers (e.g. Shell) have stipulated in their general working conditions that the 30% rule income tax benefit is solely for the benefit of the company, arguing that salaries of their local workers would not be on par with their foreign work force. The 30% rule income tax benefit is then divided between an employee and the employer up to the level as if the foreigner employer fictively paid the income tax on the entire salary and the surplus left to the company.

A similar rule also applies to compensate Dutch employees who are assigned to work in designated developing countries or to the Dutch nationals returning to the Netherlands after a substantial period of living abroad (10 years or longer).

Note that the formal application typically takes two to three months. The excess tax paid in the meantime will be repaid to the applicant once the 30% tax exemption is granted.

Eligibility for the 30 percent rule is subject to a set of conditions, including:

- The foreign employee was recruited outside the Netherlands or transferred from another country by their employer.
- The foreign employee possesses expertise absent or scarce in the Dutch labour market. Fulfilment of this condition is based upon gross salary, which must exceed a given minimum amount after the exemption is applied. In 2023, the threshold gross salary was €41,954 (€59,934 including the tax-free 30% allowance). A lower requirement applies for employees under the age of 30 who have obtained a master's degree or its equivalent at a Dutch or foreign university; in 2023, the respective minimum gross salary amounted to €31,891 (€45,559 including the tax-free 30% allowance). No minimum salary threshold exists for researchers under EU directives.
- In the 24 months prior to first day of employment in the Netherlands, the foreign employee lived outside of the Netherlands for more than 16 months, more than 150 kilometres away from the Dutch border. An exception exists for all Ph.D. students who recently graduated (within the previous 12 months), where the 150 km distance rule need only have been met for 16 out of the 24 months before the start of Ph.D. study.

The applicable period was originally 10 years. New legislation came in to force as per 1 January 2012, limiting the applicable period of the rule from 10 to 8 years, with a 5-year transition period. Also, foreign students acquiring a PhD in the Netherlands are eligible for the 30% ruling, even though they were not hired from abroad "Changes in 30% rule". In 2017 the new governmental coalition planned to reduce the tax break from 8 years to 5 years. However, in the 2018 budget speech, the finance minister retroactively reduced the 30% tax rule to end by Jan 2019 for all beneficiaries if over 5 years, irrespective of an earlier approval for a later end date (many cases up to 2022).

== Tax treaties ==
The Netherlands has established nearly 100 bilateral tax treaties with other countries to prevent the issue of double taxation. The overview is available at the website Dutch Tax and Customs Administration.

== See also ==
- Corporate Tax in the Netherlands
- Taxation in the Netherlands
