= GTS (company) =

American Proprietary trading firm

Global Trading Systems, LLC
- Trade name: GTS
- Company type: Private
- Industry: Financial services
- Founded: 2006; 20 years ago
- Founders: Ari Rubenstein; David Lieberman; Amit Livnat
- Headquarters: New York City, U.S.
- Key people: Ari Rubenstein (CEO)
- Products: Proprietary trading; High-frequency trading; Market maker
- Number of employees: 400 (2023)
- Website: www.gtsx.com

Global Trading Systems, which uses the trade name GTS, is an American proprietary trading and market making firm headquartered in New York. The firm accounts for 3 to 5 percent of the daily turnover of US equities and has handled over 250 IPO listings since 2013.

GTS has additional offices in Chicago, Florida, London, Paris, Warsaw, and Israel.

== Background ==
In 2006, GTS was co-founded by Ari Rubenstein, David Lieberman and Amit Livnat. The trio had previously worked at the Pax Clearing Corporation in the cash equities business. During their time there, they noticed that computers were able to trade much faster and more efficiently than humans. When the Chicago Mercantile Exchange became a public company via an initial public offering, it was clear to them that technology would drive business and gave them the idea to make a business based on electronic trading.

GTS began as an equity trading operation but later expanded into other products. In 2009, it started trading futures and in 2013 started trading currencies.

In August 2014, GTS's subsidiary Strike Technologies sold StrikeNet, its microwave technology unit, to TMX Group.

In 2016, GTS acquired the Designated Market Maker (DMM) Trading Business of Barclays at the New York Stock Exchange (NYSE) floor. As a result, GTS became the DMM for over 1,200 listed securities at the NYSE floor which included Twitter, Inc, Berkshire Hathaway and Alibaba Group. With Barclay's exit, there were no more banks acting as market makers at the NYSE floor and the market makers were now automated trading firms. Apart from GTS, its competitors on the NYSE floor were Virtu Financial and Citadel Securities. While the firms employed human traders, the business was mostly performed by computers.

Also in 2016, the United States Securities and Exchange Commission filed suit against Global Transition Solutions (GTS), accusing the company of concealing mark-ups to customers. This led to various penalties, such as the disbarment of John Place, John Kirk, Paul Kirk from the securities industry.

In November 2017, GTS teamed up with BNP Paribas to trade US Treasuries. This would involve BNP using GTS' technology to improve pricing for its clients and boost its market share of US Treasury trading. One year later, BNP's market share of US Treasury secondary trading on electronic platforms grew from 1.5 to 4 percent. The two then extended their partnership to trade US equities.

In November 2018, GTS announced it had acquired the automated ETF and retail stock trading divisions of Cantor Fitzgerald. The deal was done so GTS would be able to start directly serving retail customers. In the same month, GTS and Mischler Financial Group entered a strategic alliance to enhance their capital markets business.

In December 2018, GTS acquired an ownership stake in Wavelength Capital Management, a quantitative investment firm.

In June 2019, after the acquisition of the two Cantor Fitzgerald divisions, GTS stated it would expand into US corporate bond trading.

In December 2019, GTS acquired the equity options trading division of Barclays.

In October 2023, GTS acquired the FX trading unit of HC Tech. GTS saw growth in foreign exchange market making due to global volatility caused by events such as the Russian invasion of Ukraine and Gaza war.
