= Taxation in the Netherlands =

Taxation in the Netherlands is defined by the income tax (Wet op de inkomstenbelasting 2001), the wage withholding tax (Wet op de loonbelasting 1964), the value added tax (Wet op de omzetbelasting 1968) and the corporate tax (Wet op de vennootschapsbelasting 1969).

== Income tax ==
In the Netherlands, residents pay income tax on their worldwide income. Non-residents are taxed on income sourced in the Netherlands only. Income tax is collected by Tax and Customs Administration. For purposes of determining income tax, income is divided into the following three categories, so called boxes:

=== Box 1: income from work and home ownership ===
A progressive tax rate on income from work and housing with two tax brackets applies to income in Box 1. In the past, there were four brackets, the highest of which was 72%, but in 1990 it was changed to 60%, and in 2001 it became 52%. The four bracket system was changed to a two bracket system in 2020, with lower incomes taxed at 36.97% (as of 2024) and higher incomes at 49.50%. Certain expenditures, referred to as personal allowances, can be deducted from income prior to tax calculation. Examples of personal allowances are donations to eligible charities, maintenance costs, medical or study expenses. Income-dependent credits reduce the tax owed. Taxpayers above the official retirement age are entitled to a reduced tax rate.

=== Box 2: financial interest in a company ===
A two-bracket tax of 24.5% and 33% applies to income from substantial interest in a company. A substantial interest in a company is defined as owning at least 5% of its shares, options or profit-sharing certificates; either by the taxpayer themselves or together with their tax partner.

=== Box 3: savings and investment ===
Box 3 concerns income from wealth. Wealth is calculated as value of assets (such as savings or shares) minus any debts. Income from wealth is taxed at a 36% rate. For tax purposes, a fixed return on savings and investments is presumed, based on the actual distribution of Box 3 assets (with different rates applied to bank assets and physical assets). Presumed gains are calculated each year based on market returns realized in the past. A tax allowance on capital yields is provided. Certain assets are so called tax-free capital and are exempt from income tax, such as green investments.

For income taxes, the tax year is equivalent to calendar year. Tax returns are due by 1 May of the subsequent year. Married couples submit a joint assessment, except in the case when a divorce petition has been filed.

== Value added tax ==
The value added tax system follows European Union regulation. For value added tax there are three categories: foods and essentials, non-foods and luxuries, and special goods. These three categories have rates of 9%, 21%, and 0%, respectively. The non-foods and luxuries percentage was increased from 19% to 21% on 1 October 2012, while the foods and essentials percentage was increased from 6% to 9% percent on 1 January 2019. The special goods cover:

- Goods that are exported
- Goods that haven't been introduced yet
- Catch of Fish
- Excised goods
- International transport of people

=== Import VAT ===
Unlike some states in member countries that make up the EU, the Dutch tax regime allows the deferral of import VAT payment. Instead of conducting payment at the time when goods are imported to the EU, the VAT payment may be deferred to periodic VAT returns. The import VAT needs to be reported; however, as the amount may be deducted from the corresponding period VAT return, the deferral can prevent cash flow disadvantage arising from paying import VAT immediately at the time of import to the EU.

== Corporate tax ==
Generally, private and public companies with Dutch residency are subject to corporate income tax on their worldwide income. Corporate tax rate is based upon taxable amount, which equals taxable profit in the corresponding year minus deductible losses. In 2024, for taxable amount below €200,000, a 19% tax rate was applicable. Taxable amount of €200,000 and above was taxed at a 25.8% tax rate. Corporate tax year is equivalent to calendar year unless stated otherwise in the company's articles of association. Tax year typically follows a 12-month period; deviations are possible in the first year of incorporation.

=== Innovation box ===
To foster innovation research, an innovation box provides tax relief for innovative activities. Profits derived from self-developed intellectual property (including royalties) that qualify for the innovation box are subject to a reduced tax rate. Since January 1, 2018, the effective tax rate applicable to corporate income in the innovation box is 7%. This feature of the tax framework provides a notable tax incentive for research and development activities in the Netherlands.

=== Substantial holding exemption ===
If qualified for a substantial holding exemption, a parent company is fully exempt from paying tax on the dividends and capital gains it receives from a subsidiary. Substantial holding is defined as holding at least 5% of shares in the subsidiary. The subsidiary concerned may have both Dutch or non-Dutch residency; the equal tax treatment allows non-Dutch subsidiaries to better compete with local ones. Substantial holding exemption prevents double corporate taxation of profits. This feature of the tax regime makes the Netherlands an attractive location for European headquarters. To qualify for substantial holding exemption, at least one of three conditions (tests) must be met:

1. Motive test: shareholding in the subsidiary does not serve as a mere portfolio investment.
2. Effective tax rate test: according to Dutch tax standards, a reasonable effective tax rate is applicable to the subsidiary (that is, an effective tax rate of at least 10%).
3. Asset test: less than 50% of total assets of the subsidiary are low-taxed free portfolio investments.

=== Tax groups with subsidiaries ===
In the Netherlands, a parent company and one or more of its subsidiaries may form a tax group if certain conditions are met: Primarily, the parent company shall hold at least 95% of shares in the subsidiary. Moreover, the parent company and the subsidiary need to be established in the Netherlands, follow the same financial year and apply the same accounting policies. Members of a tax group are treated as a single taxpayer by tax authorities. Key advantages of fiscal unity are that losses incurred by one company may be deducted from profits generated by other members of the group, and that fixed assets may be transferred between companies without corporate income tax consequences.

== Property tax ==
Property tax or land value tax is claimed annually by municipalities. A fraction of the value of real estate (about a per mille) is defined as onroerendezaakbelasting (OZB). The money collected from the real-estate owners in its area can be used by the municipality to maintain the infrastructure (roads etc.). The real-estate values are estimated independently and updated annually. Taxation varies dramatically over different regions and municipalities. In addition to the property tax itself, there is a complicated additional taxation system for different infrastructural support systems: water-level management, water cleaning, waste management etc. Property tax does not belong to personal allowances deductible for income tax purposes.

== Inheritance tax ==
The inheritance tax (successierecht) charges beneficiaries of an inheritance received from Dutch residents. In case of emigration, Dutch nationals are considered Dutch residents for further 10 years. Inheritance tax rate ranges from 10% to 40%. A part of inheritance is exempt from taxation; the amount exempted depends on the relationship of beneficiary to the deceased person.

== Wealth tax ==
In lieu of a dividend or capital gains tax, the Netherlands levies a tax on "income earned through investments" (box 3) that functions like a wealth tax, assuming fixed rates of return for assets and assessing a (as of 2023) 32% income tax on the assumed return for assets, minus debts, above €57000 as of 2023 (doubled if a tax partner, eg. spouse, shares the residence). Prior to 2021, the tax functioned like a wealth tax by assuming a certain distribution of returns based on the amount of wealth, but, due to a court ruling, the tax is now assessed solely on the actual distribution of assets. The assumed rate of return varies on the type of asset and, for 2023, is assumed to be 0.36% on cash and bank accounts, 6.17% on investments, and 2.57% on debts.

== Gift tax ==
The gift tax (schenkingsrecht) charges the beneficiary of a gift.

== Legal changes ==
Legislation on tax matters in the Netherlands must enter into force on either 1 January or 1 July: these are common commencement dates which also apply across a number of other fields of legislation.

== See also ==
- General information taxes in the Netherlands
- Algemeen nut beogende instelling
- Corporate tax in the Netherlands
- Income tax in the Netherlands
- Verhuurdersheffing
