= Chicago Trading Company =

American proprietary trading firm

- Type: Private company
- Industry: Financial services
- Founded: 1995; 31 years ago
- Founders: Five partners formerly of O'Connor & Associates
- Headquarters: Chicago, United States
- Area served: United States
- Key people: Lauren Rauch and Josh Schubkegel (co-CEOs)
- Products: Proprietary trading, derivative trading
- Website: www.chicagotrading.com

Chicago Trading Company (CTC) is an American proprietary trading firm headquartered in Chicago, Illinois, specializing in options market making.

Founded in 1995, the firm provides liquidity across derivatives exchanges worldwide across a range of asset classes, including equities, interest rates, and commodities. CTC employs quantitative researchers, traders, and software engineers to develop systematic trading strategies and trading technology, with offices in Chicago, New York, London, Austin, and Amsterdam. The firm is privately held and exclusively trades its own capital.

== History ==
Chicago Trading Company was founded in 1995 by five partners formerly of O'Connor & Associates, initially to trade U.S. index options, particularly S&P 500 products. In 1998, CTC LLC was formally created.

Throughout the 2000s, CTC expanded its product offering significantly. The firm began trading individual equity options in 1999, interest rate options on the CME and CBOT in 2002, and energy products and European indices in 2003. In 2008, CTC began trading metals and European rates products. In 2025, the firm began trading Indian equity derivatives.

== Operations ==
Chicago Trading Company primarily operates as a proprietary market maker with no outside capital. The firm actively trades options and volatility/variance derivatives across a broad spectrum of asset classes, operating more than 20 hours a day, six days a week. As of 2026, CTC employed approximately 600 people across offices in Chicago, New York, London, Austin, and Amsterdam.

CTC trades on multiple global exchanges and venues. Primary exchanges include CME Group (CME, Board of Trade, NYMEX, and Comex), CBOE, ICE (NYSE/Liffe), and Eurex.

== Leadership ==
Chicago Trading Company was founded in 1995 by five partners formerly of O'Connor & Associates. Below is a list of chief executives:

Historic leadership
Name	Title	Period
Eric Chern	CEO & co-founder	December 1, 2009 – May 31, 2019
Dan Feuser	CEO (first non-founder CEO)	June 1, 2019 – December 31, 2022
Jonathan Grodnick	CEO	January 1, 2023 – December 31, 2025
Lauren Rauch and Josh Schubkegel	Co-CEO	January 1, 2026 – present

== See also ==
- Market makers
- Proprietary trading
