= MQP =

MQP may refer to:

- Kruger Mpumalanga International Airport, a South African airport
- Mandatory Quote Period, a term used on the London Stock Exchange
- Michael Quinn Patton, a leading evaluation theorist
