= Mandatory quote period =

On the London Stock Exchange, the mandatory quote period (or MQP) is the period during which all registered market makers are obliged to display prices.

In this period, market makers on the Exchange’s quote driven SEAQ and SEAQ International services are obliged to make a firm two-way quote for the securities in which they are registered. This is between 0800–1630 hours for SEAQ and 0930–1530 hours for SE.
