= Corporate tax in the Netherlands =

The Netherlands benefits from a strategic geographic location, a world-class economy, a stable political climate, and a skilled workforce. It has a large network of tax treaties, a low corporate income tax rate and a full participation exemption for capital gains and profits. These characteristics, in addition to a favorable tax environment, make Netherlands one of the most open economies in the world for multinational corporations (MNCs).

== Overview ==
Corporate tax in the Netherlands deals with the tax payable in the Netherlands on the profits earned by companies. For tax purposes, a company formed under Dutch law is considered a resident of the Netherlands and personal and business income taxes are levied in the Netherlands on worldwide income earned by tax residents. Non-residents who operate a business in the Netherlands are subject to personal or corporate income tax in the Netherlands. As of January 1, 2022, the normal Corporate Income Tax Rate (CIT) rate is 25.8 percent (25 percent in 2021). There are two income tax brackets. The first income bracket is subject to a lower rate of 15%. This tax level has been increased to EUR 395,000 in taxable income (EUR 245,000 in 2021). The excess of taxable income is taxed at the usual rate.

Profits earned by both public and private enterprises are normally subject to corporate income tax. Foundations and associations may be required to file corporate income tax reports in specific circumstances. Certain types of income, however, can be exempted or excluded from the tax base. When it comes to income from Dutch sources, non-resident entities only have a limited tax liability. Corporate income tax is not paid by some legal entities, such as fiscal investment institutions. Some legal entities may be free from corporate income tax if they invest jointly.

Dividends distributed by Dutch resident corporations with capital divided into shares are subject to a withholding tax in the Netherlands. The general rate of dividend withholding tax that Dutch resident corporations are generally subject to pay is 15%. A double taxation treaty can lower the withholding tax rate for international receivers. Furthermore, dividends may be free from taxation in the Netherlands, subject to anti-abuse rules, if both of the following conditions are met:

- The receiver of the dividends dispensed by the Dutch corporation is a resident of the European Union, the European Economic Area, or another nation with which the Netherlands has signed a tax treaty involving a dividend article (provided that the corporation is not treated as a tax resident of another nation as a result of a tax treaty between the two countries).
- The recipient of the dividends is a resident of the Netherlands

The Netherlands has committed to accept the minimum criteria (primary purposes test and dispute resolution) as well as some optional aspects of the Multilateral Convention to Implement Tax Treaty Related Measures to Prevent Base Erosion and Profit Shifting (MLI).

A value-added tax (VAT) is levied in addition to income tax in compliance with EU Directives. The final burden of VAT is borne by the end consumer. This goal is met by subtracting the amount of input VAT paid on supplies by an entrepreneur from the amount of output VAT charged on goods or services supplied or rendered by the business. The tax authorities in the Netherlands should be paid the positive balance.

== Dutch Tax and Customs Administration ==
The Dutch Tax and Customs Administration (Belastingdienst) is in charge of administrating the Netherlands' tax system, and it operates through a network of regional offices and centralized information centers. The Dutch tax authorities treat taxpayers with professionalism and cooperation. Qualifying corporate taxpayers can participate in a horizontal monitoring program, which is a cooperative compliance program. A covenant is reached between a taxpayer and the Dutch tax authorities under the horizontal monitoring program, in which the taxpayer pledges to providing information proactively and discusses any concerns in advance during frequent meetings with the Dutch tax inspector. The goal is to give the taxpayer more certainty about his or her tax situation in the Netherlands.

Ahead-of-time certainty is also available in the shape of an advance tax ruling. Only enterprises with a substantial economic connection with the country can get a tax ruling. For this to happen, the firm requesting the ruling should be a member of a group that performs economic operational activities in the Netherlands, and these economic operational activities should be undertaken by or for the company's account and risk. If the other jurisdictions concerned in the ruling are members of the EU or are parties to a treaty with the Netherlands that allows for information exchange, information on the ruling will be automatically shared with the tax authorities in other jurisdictions.

== History of corporate tax rates ==
From 1981 to 2021, the corporate tax rate in the Netherlands has decreased by about half. It peaked at 48 percent in 1982 and fell to a new low of 25 percent in 2011. The corporate tax rate dropped massively from 35 percent to 29.5 percent in 2006, and further to 25.5 percent in 2007. In 2006, the corporate local tax rate was decreased from 15% to 10%, and then to 5.5 percent in 2007. As a result, the absolute tax rates were reduced by 5.5 percent in 2006 and by 4 percent in 2007. Companies can save money on taxes by transferring income tax from 2006 or 2007 to a later year. As a result, executives can defer income tax to a lower tax tariff cycle. This tax reform, in theory, encouraged management to manage earnings in order to reduce tax payments.

The 2019 Dutch corporate tax rate was 19% of the taxable income up to and including (euro) € 200,000, above which the rate was 25%. The lower rate decreased to 16.5% in 2020. In 2021 the rate for the first bracket further decreased to 15% with taxable income up to € 245,000. The top Dutch corporate tax rate instead remained stable at 25%. As of 2022, the corporate tax rate stands at 15% for income below €395,000, above which the rate was 25.8%. These rates have been lowered by the Dutch government to stimulate a competitive tax environment for international businesses.

== Corporate tax fines in the Netherlands ==
The Netherlands tax system is administered by the “Belastingdienst” which is part of the Ministry of Finance. The Netherlands tax authority is accountable for the imposition or collection of any Tax.

Corporate tax is collected based on the company’s profit during the year. As a rule, the corporate tax year follows the calendar year from 1 January to 31 December. However, companies can have options to choose a different financial year for reasonable purposes. If the company fails to pay corporate tax on time, they have to pay interest which starts from the day after the tax due date. If the company pays tax after the due dates, the tax authority regards them as debt. Therefore, they charge the company the recovery interest. The recovery interest is calculated based on the following:

- The duration of time for which the interest must be paid
- The quantity of payment that was delayed
- The rate at which the interest is applied to recover the payment.

A 4% interest fee is usually charged to payments that are made after the due date. The table below illustrates the interest percentages which are determined biannually.

| Period | percentage |
|---|---|
| From 1-1-2024 | 4 |
| From 7/1/2023 to 12/31/2023 | 3 |
| From 1-1-2023 to 30-6-2023 | 2 |
| From 1-7-2022 to 31-12-2022 | 1 |
| From 3/23/2020 to 6/30/2022 | 0.01 |
| From 4/1/2014 to 3/22/2020 | 4 |
| 1/1/2013 to 4/1/2014 | 3 |

== Corporate Tax Fiscal Unity ==
Under Dutch tax laws, every company has to pay its own corporate income tax. When a parent company and its subsidiary companies form a tax group, they are treated as a single taxpayer. This means that instead of each company paying its own corporate income tax, it will be collected as a single entity. One of the advantages of forming a tax group is that if one company incurs a loss, it can be deducted from the profits of other companies. However, the parent company must have a significant level of control over its subsidiary. Firstly, the parent company should own at least 95% of the subsidiary's shares which entitles them to 95% or more of the subsidiary's profits. Secondly, the parent company should hold at least 95% voting rights in the subsidiary. Besides both the parent company and subsidiary must have the same financial year, apply the same accounting policies, and be established in the Netherlands.

If a company is not based in the Netherlands, it would not fit the regular requirements for fiscal unity, which is a group of companies that can include both the Netherlands and non-Netherlands entities. However, if the members of the group include Netherlands companies, they can still form fiscal unity in two specific situations.

- A parent company based in the Netherlands can form a fiscal unity with a sub-subsidiary established in the Netherlands while the sub-subsidiary's shares are owned by an intermediate company based in another EU. In that case, the intermediate company is not considered fiscal unity.
- Sister companies based in the Netherlands can form a fiscal unity when the shares are owned by the same top company based in another EU. In that case, the top company is not considered the fiscal unity

== Exemptions ==
Certain items of income are exempt from Dutch corporate tax. The most important items of income that are exempt are:

- capital gains and dividends derived from qualifying subsidiaries ("participation exemption")
- income attributable to a foreign business enterprise ("permanent establishment").
- if the taxable profit in a year does not exceed € 15,000 or if the taxable profit in one year exceeds € 15,000, but together with the taxable profits in the preceding 4 years does not exceed € 75,000

=== Participation exemption ===
Capital gains, dividends and profit participation loan interest derived from a qualifying subsidiary are fully exempt from corporate tax in the Netherlands ("participation exemption"). A subsidiary qualifies for the Dutch participation exemption when:

- the subsidiary is an active company, and
- the Dutch parent company holds an interest of at least 5% of such company.

=== Foreign branch ===
Any income received by a Dutch company from a foreign branch is exempt from Dutch corporate tax, provided such branch is a permanent establishment or representative.

=== Anti-abuse clause ===
The Dutch Corporate income tax regulations have included a great many anti-avoidance clauses since 1969, to avoid abuse of the tax rules by corporations. There have been implemented anti abuse clauses for the participation exemption, interest deductions for hybrid loans and recently for the dividend withholding tax act.

=== No exemptions ===
In certain cases, it may be advantageous to reject the exemption for your company such as allowing you to offset a loss. If this is the case, you must do so by sending a letter to your tax office before your corporation tax return for the first year of the five-year period is processed.

== Tax haven ==
The Netherlands has been known internationally, since at least the 1970s, as a tax haven. A political debate about this issue started in 1977, when economist and social-democratic MP Flip de Kam published a book about corporations transferring large sums to Caribbean countries without paying Dutch corporate tax. Minister Van der Stee admitted that the country was internationally known as a tax haven, but refused to act, arguing that the problem could not be solved on a national level alone. The debate raged for years; in 1986, Representative Willem Vermeend estimated that the country's tax service missed some ƒ4 billion per year due to companies such as The Rolling Stones' holding bv's using the "Caribbean route".

Dutch tax laws have brought the country into conflict with the European Union several times, starting with strong criticism in the 1999 Primarolo Report. The Dutch government responded by having a group of high-ranking fiscal experts (known with the Ministry of Finance as the "Barbapapa group") create a smoke screen, changing the appearance of the fiscal system while leaving its structure intact.

Starting 2009, the "tax haven" label resurfaced and sparked political controversy when the White House issued a press release in which the Netherlands was mentioned as tax haven. According to various NGO's the Netherlands "can be seen as an intermediary tax haven for foreign corporations". In February 2013, the Dutch House of Representatives accepted a motion calling on cabinet members to "reject, and where possible in discussions to insist on not mentioning" the qualification of the country as a tax haven; the motion was drafted by MP Roland van Vliet, a former tax advisor with Ernst & Young. Economist Ewald Engelen estimated that at the time of the motion, the state earned some €1.5 billion in tax from €12 trillion being transferred through the country annually.

As of 2013, the country harbors holding companies for various multinationals, participates in more than a hundred bilateral tax treaties, and the various exemptions facilitate tax avoidance by corporations. A notable example is most of the holdings of the Agnelli family which are incorporated there.

In June 2014 the EU initiated a new investigation relating to the Dutch corporate taxes as part of a State aid (European Union) case by the Directorate General for Competition. The case was specific to Starbucks. The investigation ended in October 2015, with the EC ordering Starbucks to pay up to €30 million in overdue taxes. The EC exposed in its decision a legal structure commonly used by companies established in the Netherlands to avoid corporate taxation, the so called Dutch BV-CV structure. In 2017, the EU initiated another State aid (European Union) investigation into a special deal on corporate taxation between the Dutch public administration and IKEA.

National and foreign companies known to have special agreements with the Dutch tax service include Starbucks, Microsoft and PostNL. A 2015 FOI request by de Volkskrant to unearth the agreements failed, because these secret agreements are not centrally administered by the Tax and Customs Administration; with even the House of Representatives not having access to them.

== See also ==
- Taxation in the Netherlands
