= Akuna Capital =

Proprietary trading firm

Akuna Capital LLC
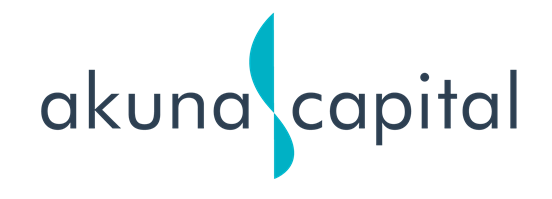

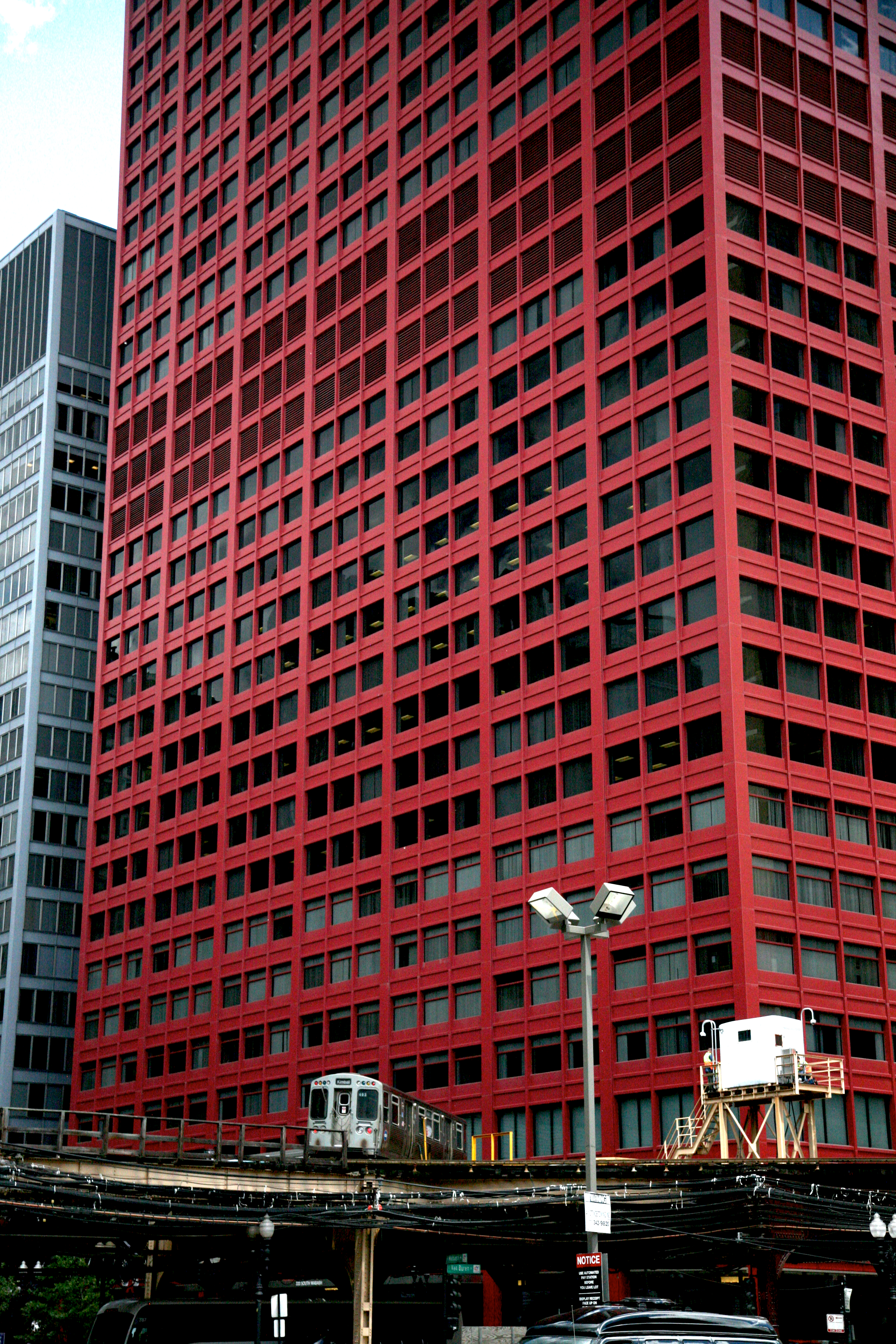
- Headquarters at 333 South Wabash
- Type: Private
- Industry: Financial services
- Founded: 2011; 15 years ago
- Founders: Andrew Killion; Mitchell Skinner
- Headquarters: 333 South Wabash, Chicago, Illinois, U.S.
- Key people: Andrew Killion (Chairman)
- Products: Proprietary trading Algorithmic trading High-frequency trading
- Number of employees: 580 (2022)
- Website: www.akunacapital.com

Akuna Capital is an American proprietary trading firm headquartered in Chicago. It has additional offices in London, Shanghai, Sydney and Singapore.

== Background ==
Akuna Capital was co-founded by Andrew Killion in 2011 in Chicago. Killion was previously a partner at Optiver and had left his hometown of Sydney in 2011 to move to Chicago. Chicago was selected to launch Akuna Capital as it was considered the center of the world for derivatives and options.

The word Akuna comes from an Australian Aboriginal word that means flowing water.

Akuna Capital has an affiliated broker-dealer named Akuna Securities.

According to Bloomberg News, Akuna Capital had one of the highest monthly salaries for internships in the financial sector from 2021 to 2022.

== History ==
In 2015, Akuna Capital signed a deal with the state of Illinois worth $4.5 million in tax breaks. Under the deal, Akuna Capital would hire ten new employees where five would be in trading and five would be in software.

In 2019, Akuna Capital lost $5.4 million on cryptocurrency assets and technology startups.

In January 2023, the firm cut 11% of its entire global workforce with some new hires having their contracts rescinded.

In June 2023, Akuna cut 40% of its Asia-pacific workforce.
