= Flow trading =

Type of investment trading

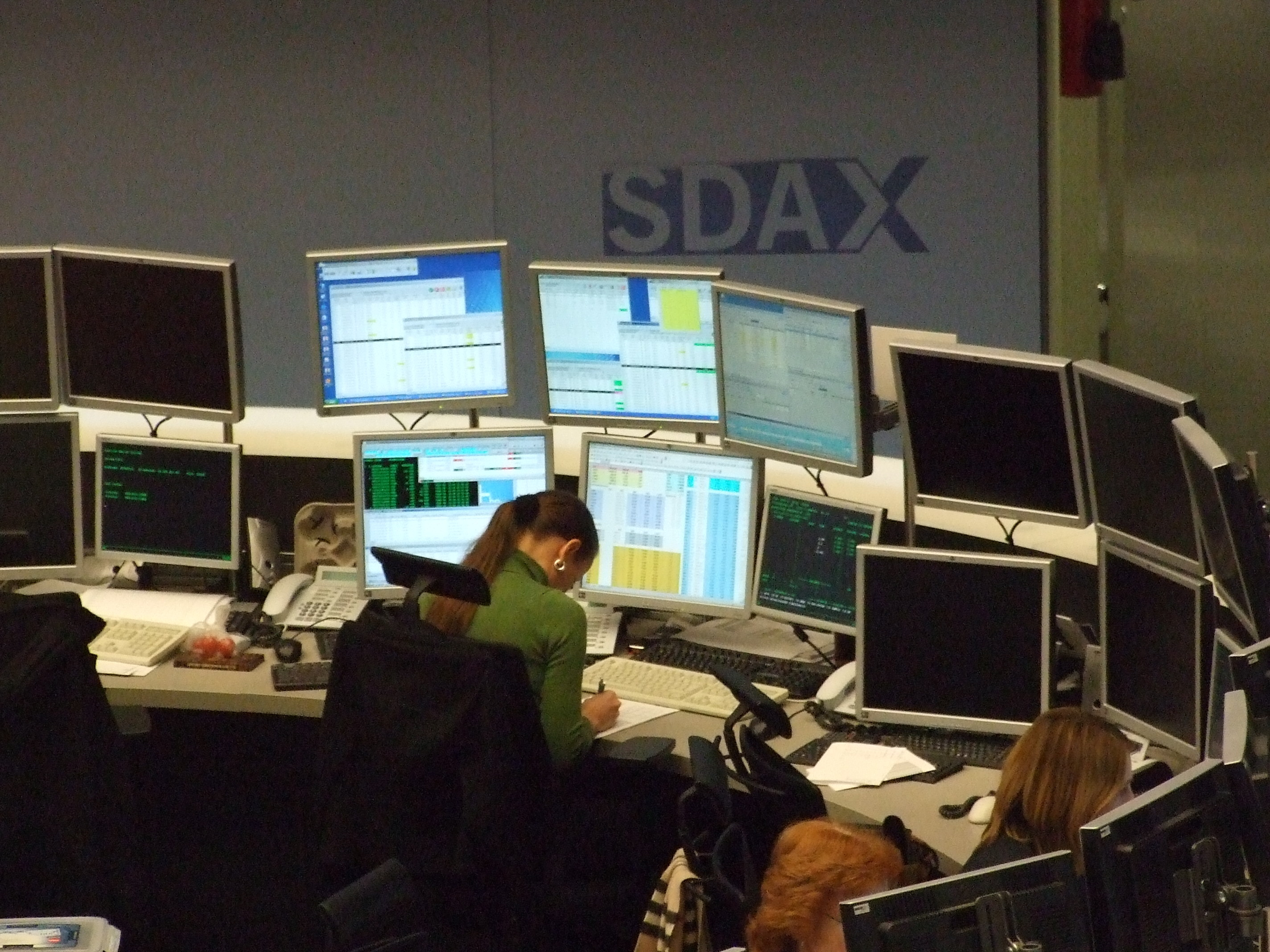
A stock trading desk

In finance, flow trading occurs when a firm trades stocks, bonds, currencies, commodities, their derivatives, or other financial instruments, with funds from a client, rather than its own funds. In foreign exchange markets, dealers use the aggregate order flow they observe from clients to price currencies and manage their own positions.

Flow trading can be a significant source of profits for investment banks. For example, in the first quarter of 2026 JPMorgan's fixed-income traders recorded their second-best quarterly haul on record, while Goldman Sachs reported record equities trading revenue, both reflecting elevated client activity. Engaging in flow trading can also boost a firm's own proprietary trading profits via access to information on client activities. Additionally, the firm can often facilitate client trades by serving as the counterparty, thus profiting from the bid–offer spread.

In 2011, the Volcker Rule aimed to limit flow trading businesses from taking proprietary bets.
