= Mischler Financial Group =

- Type: Private company
- Industry: Financial services
- Founded: 1994; 32 years ago
- Founder: Walter Mischler
- Headquarters: Newport Beach, California, United States
- Key people: Dean Chamberlain (CEO), Doyle Holmes (COO), H.R. McMaster (Special advisor)
- Services: Investments in service-Disabled Veteran-Owned Small Business
- Number of employees: 50+ (2019)
- Website: mischlerfinancial.com

Mischler Financial Group is the American boutique investment bank and brokerage that became the financial industry's first firm owned and operated by Service-Disabled Veterans.

It is not only the financial services industry's oldest minority firm, Mischler was the first Finra member firm to become a service-Disabled Veteran-Owned Small Business.

The group is based in Irvine, California, with co-headquarters in Stamford, Connecticut and regional offices in Chicago, Illinois, Boston, Massachusetts, Red Bank, New Jersey, and Detroit, Michigan.

== History ==
In 1989, California established the Disabled Veteran Business Enterprise (DVBE) Program, which formally classified service-disabled veterans (SDVs) as a minority group for the purpose of state and municipal government contract awards and entitled Service-Disabled Veteran Owned Businesses (SDVOBs) the same recognition as that provided to other State-recognized minority business owners, including women-owned businesses, African-American-owned businesses and Hispanic-American-owned businesses. The Act promoted self-reliance for California's disabled veterans by offering veterans the opportunity to gain experience in and provide resources by which disabled veterans could pursue the establishment of their own businesses with the same opportunities available to minority-owned businesses. Soon thereafter, Walter Mischler, then a senior manager for a regional securities brokerage in Southern California whose earlier career path began as a graduate of the United States Military Academy, and who then served two tours in the Vietnam War before sustaining injuries that led to his receiving a service-disabled certification, was determined to create his own investment firm and leverage the resources and opportunities provided to service-disabled veterans under recent state, and soon thereafter, federal legislation.

In 1994, under Walt Mischler's leadership, The Mischler Financial Group became the very first minority broker-dealer to be owned and operated by service-disabled veterans and soon after, became the first federally-certified SDV-owned business enterprise operating within the financial services industry. Since its formation, the firm has grown from its role as a small boutique firm with five employees operating out of a Newport Beach office to employing more than 100 financial industry professionals with offices in five major US cities. The firm is committed to mentoring service-disabled veterans as they seek roles within the private sector as well as the financial services industry, advocates on behalf of multiple organizations that promote opportunities and support for the service-disabled veteran community, and is dedicated to hiring qualified veterans for roles within the firm when opportunities arise. 20% of the firm's members are service-disabled veterans, including Walt Mischler, the founder/chairman emeritus, and Dean Chamberlain, the firm's CEO and principal.

In November 2018, Mischler entered into a strategic partnership with GTS Securities, the NYSE Designated Market-Maker and multi-asset electronic market-maker. That arrangement included GTS making an equity investment in Mischler where GTS becomes a minority stake-holder.

In 2019, Mischler expand its company's cash management capabilities and market fund to be led by La-Yona Rauls and Christopher Walsh.

== Key people ==
=== Walter Mischler ===
Walter Mischler, the founder of the firm (now retired) remains chairman emeritus of Mischler Financial Group. He graduated from the United States Military Academy at West Point and served as an infantry officer for the United States Army during the Vietnam War. After sustaining combat injuries that led to his service-disabled veteran certification and leaving the military, Mischler worked in sales for companies like Procter & Gamble, Squibb Pharmaceutical, and Black & Decker. Mischler was working for Liberty Capital Markets Inc. as an account executive when he learned of California's Disabled Veteran Business Enterprise (DVBE) Program, and left his job to start his own business and Mischler Financial Group was created in 1994.

=== Dean Chamberlain ===
Dean Chamberlain is the chief executive officer and principal of Mischler Financial Group and has served in this role since January 2013. Chamberlain is a graduate of the United States Military Academy at West Point, where he received a Bachelor of Science Degree in mechanical engineering management, and thereafter he served 6 years as an officer in the U.S. Army before he sustained injuries in the line of duty that led to his being certified as service-disabled. He then received a master's degree in business administration from J.L. Kellogg Graduate School of Management at Northwestern University. Prior to being appointed CEO of Mischler Financial Group in 2013, Chamberlain's Wall Street career included senior roles for leading investment banks.

=== Doyle Holmes ===
Doyle Holmes is the president and chief operating officer at the Mischler Financial Group. Holmes attended Golden Gate University in San Francisco, California, where he received a Bachelor of Arts degree in business administration. Holmes has had a lot of experience working in leadership positions in the financial industry.

=== Lt. General H.R. McMaster (Ret.) ===
Former US National Security Advisor to the President of the United States, Lt. General Herbert Raymond ("H.R") McMaster (Ret.) was appointed Special Advisor to Mischler Financial Group in December 2020. General McMaster, whose distinguished military career extended over thirty-four years prior to his retirement in 2018, holds an M.A. and Ph.D. in American history, and serves as a guest lecturer at the Stanford University Graduate School of Business.

== Philanthropy ==
Mischler Financial Group committed to not only hiring and training qualified service-disabled veterans, the firm is committed to giving back to the veteran and SDV community. Mischler Financial Group has advocated SDV legislation since introduced in various States and has helped raise millions of dollars and directly donated hundreds of thousands of dollars to Service-Disabled Veteran support programs including, among others, Wounded Warrior Project, The Fisher House Foundation, The Children of Fallen Patriots Foundation, Bob Woodruff Foundation, and Lead The Way Fund.

== Investment banking presence ==
Thanks in part to Mischler Financial Group's minority (a.k.a. diversity-certified) designations [SDVOSB and MBE), coupled with the capital markets capabilities, the firm's management and employees, many of whom are service-disabled veterans, and before joining Mischler, they had previously served in senior capital markets roles for the financial industry's premier investment firms, Mischler has established a notable presence across the primary debt and equities capital markets. Mischler has played a role as underwriting manager, co-manager and or selling group member on behalf of dozens of Fortune corporations in the course of their issuing billions of dollars of new debt and equity issuance.

Mischler Financial Group has helped to underwrite debt capital market deals for among others, GE Capital, Fannie Mae, Bank of America, Chevron Corporation, PG&E, Goldman Sachs, Citigroup, Toyota Motor Credit Corporation, and has been awarded mandates to serve as co-manager and/or selling group member for a number of the most widely followed initial public offerings (IPOs), including Uber, Lyft, Snap Inc, Alibaba and Twitter.

== Corporate events ==
In recent years, Mischler Financial has been selected by the New York Federal Reserve Bank on two recent occasions to be one of a very short list of firms designated to participate in pilot programs that intended to level the playing field by enabling those select minority firms to serve side-by-side with the 21 global banks that the Federal Reserve has designated to be primary dealers. This means that Mischler Financial Group is one of only a few non-primary dealers designated by the New York Federal Reserve Bank to serve in the same capacity as the 21 primary government dealers in connection with the distribution of new debt issues from the United States Government and facilitate the US Treasury's QE-related bond repurchase program on behalf of the United States Government.
