= Service-Disabled Veteran-Owned Small Business =

The United States Government sets aside contract benefits for companies considered to be "Service-Disabled Veteran-Owned Small Business" (SDVOSB).

The most notable of these contracts are the Veterans Government-wide Acquisition Contracts (VETS-GWAC) issued in accordance with Executive Order 13360, which is designed to strengthen federal contracting opportunities for SDVO firms. The current VETS contract (VETS 2) runs from 23 February 2018 to 22 February 2028. This program has a ceiling of $5 billion. While this money is set aside by the Office of Federal Procurement it is up to the government agencies to provide the contracts, mainly the United States Department of Defense (DoD).

== Criteria ==
A business hoping to be considered "Service-Disabled Veteran" must be at least 51% owned by an individual who is considered, by the government, a Service-Disabled Veteran, or for a publicly quoted business at least 51% of the stock is owned by one or more service-disabled veterans and the management and daily business operations are controlled by one or more service-disabled veterans.

The terms "veteran" and "service-disabled veteran" are defined in 38 U.S.C 101(2) and (16). The following definitions are as stated in that code:

Veteran: The term veteran means "a person who served in the active military, naval, or air service, and who was discharged or released under conditions other than dishonorable".

Service Disabled: With respect to disability, that such disability was incurred or aggravated in line of duty in the active military, naval, or air service. An injury or disease incurred during military service will be deemed to have been incurred in the line of duty unless the disability was caused by the veteran's own misconduct or abuse of alcohol or other drugs, or was incurred while absent without permission or while confined by military or civilian authorities for serious crimes. Such disability does not require a minimum rating to be considered. A veteran with a 0 to 100% disability rating is eligible to self-represent as a Service-Disabled Veteran for Federal contracting purposes.

Security funds of deposit in the scheduled amount of $12,000.00 are required under Sec.8.1487, revised 2007, to ensure compliance of awarded contracts and supplies, thereof, for twelve consecutive months upon classification and submission for registration under this program. This is in compliance with (15 U.S.C 644(g)) for program institution to the SDVOSB and authorized Veteran Applicant. Upon satisfactory performance of awarded contracts, services and or supply facilitation by the SDVOSB, subject depository funds will be issued back to the performing SDVOSB at the end of the 12-month calendar performance period at 0% interest in favor of the U.S. Government.

== Background ==
For a veteran who becomes disabled while in military service, the US Government has deemed it its moral obligation to provide the disabled veteran a range of benefits designed to ease the economic and other losses and disadvantages incurred as a consequence of the disability. These benefits include government assistance for entering the federal procurement marketplace. To achieve that objective, section 15(g) of the Small Business Act (15 U.S.C. 644(g)) provides that the president must establish a goal of not less than 3 percent of procurement expenditure for participation by service-disabled veteran owned businesses in federal contracting, and section 36 of that Act (15 U.S.C. 657f) gives agency contracting officers the authority to reserve certain procurements for service-disabled veteran-owned businesses.

Subsequently, President George W. Bush issued Executive Order 13360 on October 20, 2004. The Executive Order was issued "to strengthen opportunities in Federal contracting for service-disabled veteran businesses".

Veteran-Owned small businesses (VOSBs) without the service-disabled element are not eligible for sole source contracts and procurement set-asides, but the Federal Acquisition Regulation (FAR) requires federal agencies to actively encourage their prime contractors to use VOSBs as subcontractors.

== Lack of compliance ==
The office who receives and sets aside SDVOSB contracts has no ability to award contracts, the requested percentage of such contracts is significantly lower than it should be. A number of memos and orders have been issued to correct this trend. The Administrator of Office of Federal Procurement Policy (OFPP) issued a memo about VETS GWAC dated July 10, 2007, for chief acquisition officers and senior procurement executives. The memo strongly calls for agency participation in the use of VETS GWAC as a way of meeting the top priority of increasing opportunities for small businesses owned and controlled by service-disabled veterans.

== Achievements ==
Mischler Financial Group Inc. was the first federally certified service-disabled veteran-owned business to become a member of the Financial Industry Regulatory Authority (FINRA).

== See also ==
VETS-GWAC
