= Flow Traders =

Financial services company

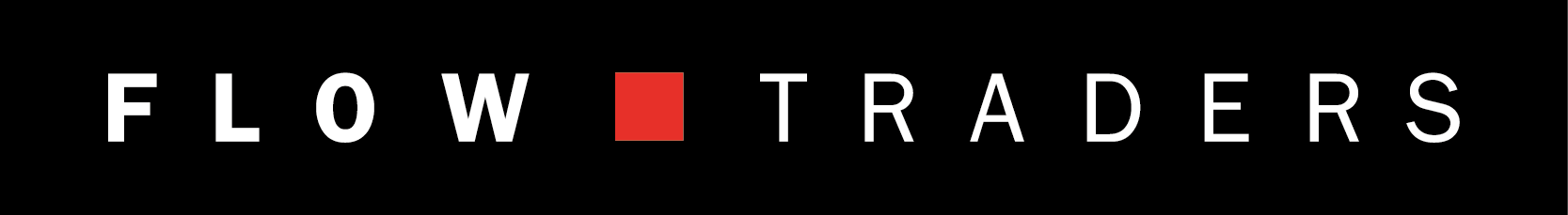
- Type: Public
- Traded as: Euronext Amsterdam: FLOW
- ISIN: BMG3602E1084
- Industry: Financial services
- Founded: 2004
- Headquarters: Amsterdam, Netherlands
- Key people: Mike Kuehnel (CEO)
- Products: Securities trading, Market making, High-frequency trading
- Revenue: ▲€933.4 million (2020)
- Operating income: ▲€586.6 million (2020)
- Number of employees: 600 (2022)
- Website: www.flowtraders.com

Flow Traders is a proprietary trading firm. A market maker, it provides liquidity in the securities market by using high frequency and quantitative trading strategies.

Originally founded in Amsterdam, Flow Traders also has offices in New York, London, Milan, Paris, Cluj, Shanghai, Singapore, Chicago, and Hong Kong.

== Activities ==
Flow Traders continuously quotes bid and ask prices for Exchange Traded Products (ETPs), options, fixed income products, and currencies. In 2019, Flow Traders announced that it would also begin trading cryptocurrencies.

One of the world's largest ETP market makers, it provides liquidity for more than 13,000 ETP listings across North America, Europe, and Asia Pacific. As of 2020, Flow Traders is Europe's largest ETF market maker.

In April 2020, Flow Traders established the Flow Traders Foundation, a charitable foundation that focuses on poverty alleviation. https://flowtradersfoundation.org/

In 2022, Flow Traders announced the departures of its Chief Risk Officer, Britta Achmann, Chief Technology Officer, Thomas Wolff, and Chief Executive Officer, Dennis Dijkstra. In 2023, Mike Kuehnel assumed the role of CEO at Flow Traders.

== Initial public offering ==
The company filed for an initial public offering on Euronext Amsterdam on 10 July 2015. The shares were placed at a price of €32 each, with Flow valued at approximately €1.5 billion. Flow Traders floated up to 40% of the company.

== Coronavirus pandemic ==
During the 2020 COVID-19 pandemic, Flow set up tents in their offices to allow employees to continue trading despite lockdown. It reported breakout profits in the same year, with profits up 3543%.

== Change of corporate holding structure ==
On 13 January 2023 Flow Traders announced the completion of the update of its corporate holding structure. As a result of the corporate holding structure update, Flow Traders' ultimate holding company is now Flow Traders Ltd and its shares remain on Euronext Amsterdam.
