= Quantlab =

Proprietary trading firm

Quantlab Financial LLC
- Company type: Private
- Industry: Financial services
- Founded: 1998; 28 years ago
- Founders: Wilbur "Ed" Bosarge, Jr. Bruce Eames
- Headquarters: 3 Greenway Plaza, Houston, Texas, U.S.
- Products: Proprietary trading Algorithmic trading High-frequency trading
- Website: www.quantlab.com

Quantlab is an American quantitative proprietary trading firm headquartered in Houston, Texas. It has additional offices in New York, Chicago, Boston, Austin, Denver and Singapore.

== Background ==
Quantlab was founded on 1998 by Wilbur "Ed" Bosarge Jr. a former Rice University mathematics professor and Bruce Eames, a former Boston Consulting Group associate and businessman from Wisconsin. During the first few years, the firm hired several Math PhDs as employees. The team wrote algorithms to perform high-frequency trading and tailored the code to help Quantlab expand into new asset classes and markets.

For more than a decade through 2015, Quantlab was a major player in high-frequency trading which on some days accounted for 3% of The New York Stock Exchange's trading volume. During that period it generated more than $3 billion in cumulative profits where more than 70% of those profits went to Bosarge.

In March 2017, Quantlab acquired the proprietary trading assets of Teza Technologies LLC, another quantitative trading firm for around $20–30 million. As part of the deal, twenty Teza employees joined Quantlab.

== Controversies ==
=== SXP lawsuit ===
In June 2007, Quantlab sued two former employees in Harris County, Texas, civil court accusing them of stealing the firm's code and algorithms to use in their startup, SXP which was a competitor to Quantlab. The employees were Ukrainian PhD researchers, Andriy Kuharsky and Vitaliy Godlevsky who were some of the early employees of the firm and wrote algorithms that generated hundreds of millions in revenue during 2001 to 2007. The two who earned five-figure salaries felt they were underpaid and in 2006, started asking their bosses about the compensation plan and challenging some operational matters. In March 2007, Quantlab fired both for insubordination.

In January 2008, Kuharsky quit SXP after a falling-out and emailed Eames under a pseudonym to say SXP was using Quantlab's code. Kuharsky later recanted his assertions, saying they were an attempt to get Quantlab to end its dispute with him. In March 2008, the Federal Bureau of Investigation raided SXP offices and employees' homes after a complaint was made by Quantlab. Later the Harris County court dismissed Quantlab's lawsuits without prejudice.

In 2009, Quantlab launched a federal lawsuit in the U.S. district court of the Southern District of Texas against SXP and its founders, accusing them of copyright infringement. In August 2001, the U.S. Attorney office for the Southern District of Texas said it wouldn't prosecute the founders. However it produced a summary report of the investigation stating there was evidence, that Kuharsky downloaded code from Quantlab servers after he was fired.

In 2012 SXP closed after Godlevsky accused co-founder Emmanuel Mamalakis of misdirecting the funds.

In May 2015, the jury sided with Quantlab awarding it $12.2 million in damages from Kuharsky and Mamalakis. Six other defendants and SXP Analytics LLC arrived at a settlement with Quantlab before the trial and agreed to bear responsibility for $28.5 million in damages.

Kuharsky and Mamalakis appealed the decision but in June 2017, the court upheld the verdict.

=== Ownership dispute ===
Bosarge and his family owned more than 70% of the Quantlab Group while Eames and Andrey Omeltchenko, one of the first employees owned 24% and 24% respectively. Since early 2016, there was a power struggle regarding ownership between the two parties. Eames and Omeltchenko stated Bosarge ended a $1.7 billion offer for the company and then "effectuated a tyrannical coup" that forced them out.

In November 2017, Eames and Omeltchenko sought to replace Bosarge as the general partner of the company through an action in the Court of Chancery in Delaware. However a judge ruled against it stating they did not have the ability under Quantlab's governing documents to force Bosarge out. Afterwards, Eames and Omeltchenko filed a suit in the district court of Harris County, Texas against Quantlab and Bosarage alleging fraud and asking a judge to give them control of the firm.

At the same time Quantlab separately filed a lawsuit against a lawyer allegedly consulting with Eames and Omeltchenko.

=== Testifying against former Deutsche Bank Traders ===
In September 2020, Quantlab and Citadel Securities testified against two former Deutsche Bank traders, James Vorley and Cedric Chanu in a criminal trial. The two were accused of defrauding the firms' supercomputers via spoofing.
