= SEAQ =

The Stock Exchange Automated Quotation system (or SEAQ) is a system for trading small-cap London Stock Exchange (LSE) companies. Stocks need to have at least two market-makers to be eligible for trading via SEAQ. New securities cannot be listed via the SEAQ system. In the LSE, only AIM stocks with low liquidity are traded on the SEAQ market. It is a quote-driven market made by specialized and competing dealers, also known as market-makers. The system contains no public limit order book.

The idea behind the SEAQ system is that individual investors should always be able to trade and that the element of competition between market-makers should lead to narrower dealing Bid–ask spreads. However, Bid/Ask spreads and hence trading costs on SEAQ are typically high because of the combination of the market-maker driven trading system and the lack of liquidity.

== Regulation ==
The AIM market is not considered to be an EURM (European Regulated Market), it is instead classified as multilateral trading facility (MTF). Because of this the SEAQ system is allowed to continue even though it is not considered to be MiFID compliant.

For this reason the LSE developed the SETSqx system which replaced the SEAQ system for all Main Market securities in October 2007. The SETSqx system allows members of the public to display limit orders, although these orders are traded through so that typically incoming market priced orders will trade with the 'Market Makers Quotes' and not at better prices, which may be available inside the market makers Bid–ask spreads.
