= Verhuurderheffing =

Dutch public housing tax

The Verhuurderheffing is a Dutch tax on public housing. The tax was implemented under the Second Rutte cabinet to reduce the budget deficit it had run since the financial crisis in 2009, and bring it back within the deficit limit outlined in the Eurozone's Stability and Growth Pact. The tax fit into the general trend of neoliberalisation and aimed to promote private ownership of houses and prudent management of housing associations.
