= Roland van Vliet =

Dutch politician (born 1969)

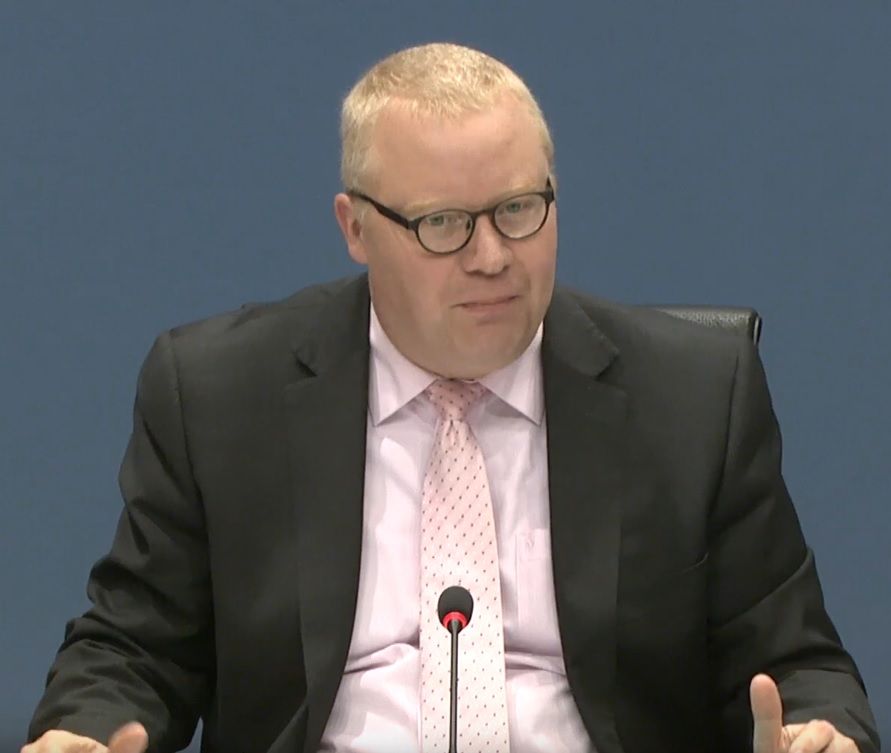

Member of the House of Representatives
- In office 17 June 2010 – 23 March 2017

Personal details
- Born: Rudolf Aleida van Vliet; 25 November 1969 (age 56) Susteren, Netherlands
- Party: People's Party for Freedom and Democracy (from 2015)
- Other political affiliations: Party for Freedom (2010–2014); Independent (2014–2015)
- Education: Maastricht University (Bachelor of Laws, Master of Laws)
- Occupation: Politician; Jurist; Financial adviser Tax advisor

Rudolf Aleida "Roland" van Vliet (born 25 November 1969) is a Dutch independent politician who served as a member of the House of Representatives between 17 June 2010 and 23 March 2017. A member of the Party for Freedom (PVV) until he left it on 20 March 2014, he became a member of the People's Party for Freedom and Democracy (VVD) on 1 June 2015 but remained an independent member of the House because of procedures that prohibits party switching during an incumbent legislative session. Unofficially, he caucused with the People's Party for Freedom and Democracy on voting.

A former tax advisor. As a member of the Party for Freedom (PVV), for which party he was an MP from 17 June 2010 to 20 March 2014. He focused on matters of taxes, financial regulation, energy and innovation. From March to July 2011, he was also a member of the States-Provincial of Limburg.

On 20 March 2014, van Vliet announced that he left the PVV due to Geert Wilders' statement that there should be fewer Moroccans in the Netherlands. Van Vliet stayed in the parliament as an independent. As an independent he was chairman of the parliamentary enquiry commission into housing cooperatives. He started his chairmanship as a member of the PVV, and was the first member of the party to head an enquiry commission.

For the 2017 general election van Vliet sought to become a candidate for the People's Party for Freedom and Democracy, the party however refused. His term in the House ended on 23 March 2017.

Van Vliet studied tax law at Maastricht University.
