= Optiver =

Dutch financial services company

Optiver Holding B.V.
- Type: Private
- Industry: Financial services
- Founded: April 9, 1986; 40 years ago
- Founder: Johann Kaemingk; Ruud Vlek; Chris Oomen
- Headquarters: Amsterdam, Netherlands
- Key people: Jan Boomaars (CEO)
- Products: Securities trading
- Revenue: ▲€3.5 billion (2024)
- Operating income: ▲€1.8 billion (2024)
- Net income: ▲€1.4 billion (2024)
- Total equity: ▲€4.9 billion (2024)
- Number of employees: 2,112 (2024)
- Website: optiver.com

Optiver Holding B.V. is a proprietary trading firm and market maker for various exchange-listed financial instruments. Its name derives from the Dutch optieverhandelaar, or "option trader". The company is privately owned. Optiver trades listed derivatives, cash equities, exchange-traded funds, bonds, and foreign exchange.

== History ==
Optiver was founded by Johann Kaemingk, Ruud Vlek and Chris Oomen on April 9, 1986, as a market maker in options on the European Options Exchange (EOE), which is now Euronext. Optiver is a member of the European Principal Traders Association (FIA EPTA), FIA Principal Trading Group (PTG) in the US and FIA Japan. In 2023, Optiver became the first market maker to join the Plato Partnership as a full member.

In November 2016, Optiver was reported to have joined a consortium to build a faster data transmission network between Chicago and Tokyo.

In December 2017, Optiver joined with Equiduct to offer a one-stop shop for best execution.

In November 2018, Utrecht University and Optiver partnered to create an Algorithms in Finance course.

In June 2019, Optiver joined its US-based rival, Virtu, in funding Equiduct, a competitor to national stock exchanges and trading venues.

In April 2021, Optiver expanded further into the Asia-Pacific region with an office in Singapore, with a planned focus on commodity and equity products. It joined many other major financial services firms in doing so. The firm first made its presence in the region in Australia in 1996, then Taipei in 2005, then Hong Kong in 2007, and then Shanghai in 2012. In 2022, Optiver opened a new London office which can house as many as 200 employees. A year later, Optiver moved into new offices in downtown Chicago, with room for as many as 600 people. The firm has also joined other quant funds in expanding to India.

In June 2022, Optiver joined Aquis Exchange.

In September 2022, the firm became the latest trading member on the Vienna Stock Exchange.

== Activities ==
Optiver trades on more than 50 exchanges and trading platforms globally. In Europe, it is one of the three most active on-screen market makers in single-stock and equity-index derivatives at Eurex. Optiver was ranked as the third-biggest off-exchange market maker in European exchange-traded products.

In the U.S., Optiver is a leading market maker for the Nasdaq 100, Russell 2000 and E-mini S&P 500 options contracts. It is one of the biggest market makers for Treasury options on the CME. The firm started making markets in FX options in 2017.

Optiver sponsors chess grandmaster Anish Giri.

== Fines ==
For 11 days in March 2007, Optiver engaged in 19 instances of an illegal manipulation scheme known as "banging the close", with a minimum of 5 being noted as successful. "Banging the close" involves executing trades of large volumes near the close, with the intention of manipulating closing prices. The scheme was executed on 3 New York Mercantile Exchange (NYMEX) listed futures contract, including New York Harbor Heating Oil, New York Harbor Reformulated Gasoline Blendstock and West Texas Intermediate (WTI) Light Sweet Crude Oil.

Optiver factored in $19.3 million into its 2010 annual report towards this case. The case was settled in 2012, where Optiver was fined $14 million, of which $1 million was part of profit disgorgement. With effect for 2 years, Optiver was barred from trading any US oil futures in the last 3 minutes before close. Several traders were also handed out bans for trading commodities, ranging from 2 to 8 years in length.

== See also ==
- Market makers
- Proprietary trading
