= Algemeen nut beogende instelling =

Tax-favored organizations in the Netherlands

Since 2008 the Dutch Tax Administration can designate an institution to be a "Public Benefit Organisation" (Dutch: Algemeen Nut Beogende Instelling, ANBI). At least 90% of the efforts of an ANBI has to be focused on the general good. In addition, from 2012 until at least 2018, the culturele ANBI (cultural ANBI) would have profit from even more Dutch tax advantages.

== Conditions ==
The ANBI does not have to be a Dutch legal personality. But often the ANBI is a Dutch foundation ('stichting'), though not every foundation qualifies. It can also be a Dutch vereniging (voluntary association). It cannot be an organisation that is for the benefit of its members or shareholders only: a sport club, association of personnel, or a commercial institution. The ANBI does not have to have registered offices in the Netherlands nor in the EU.

The most important conditions are:

- The ANBI can not be a company with capital divided into shares, a cooperative, a mutual insurance society or another body that may issue participation certificates.
- At least 90% of the ANBIs efforts must be focused on the general good. The ANBI and the persons directly involved in the ANBI must comply with the integrity requirements.
- An ANBI director or person determining the policy may not treat the ANBI's assets as personal assets. The assets must be segregated.
- An ANBI may not retain more assets than reasonably required for the institutions work. For this reason the ANBI's assets must remain limited.
- The ANBI directors’ remuneration must be restricted to an expense allowance or a minimum attendance fee.
- An ANBI must possess an up-to-date policy plan.
- The ANBI's costs must be in reasonable proportion to its expenditure.
- The ANBI funds remaining after dissolution must be allocated to a general good objective identical to the ANBI's objective.
- An ANBI is governed by specific administrative obligation.

More conditions apply to ANBIs as of January 1, 2014. The Dutch Tax Administration can revoke an ANBI designation anytime. Special regulations apply in that case. The database of registered ANBIs is online and searchable.

Institutions without an office inside the Netherlands can start the application for designation as ANBI or Culturele ANBI by submitting a written request for an application form (in Dutch) to the Belastingdienst/Oost-Brabant in Eindhoven (formerly in 's-Hertogenbosch).

Institutions that have an office inside the Netherlands can download an application form.

== Advantages ==
If in a calendar year the sum of someone's gifts to ANBIs exceeds 1% of the Dutch threshold income, the excess, with a maximum of 10% of that income, is deductible income. Also the ANBI itself is exempted from inheritance tax and gift tax on inheritances and gifts it receives, except on those made under a condition such that it is not for public benefit.

== Examples ==
ANBI examples:

- Stichting Blauwe Lijn
- Stichting Max Havelaar
- Wiardi Beckman Stichting
- Wikimedia, which hosts Wikipedia.

'Culturele ANBI' examples:

- Stichting Museumjaarkaart - purpose: promote visiting Dutch museums
- VandenEnde Foundation - purpose: promote culture

Non-Dutch ANBI examples:

- International Federation of Red Cross and Red Crescent Societies in Geneva

Non-Dutch 'culturele ANBI' examples:

- Museum of Modern Art in New York

Revoked designation example:

- Stichting INGKA Foundation

Non-ANBI examples:

- Stichting Pensioenfonds Zorg en Welzijn - pension fund for the healthcare and social work sectors
- Nederlandse Omroep Stichting - purpose: make news and sports programmes for the three Dutch public television channels and the Dutch public radio services

== See also ==
- Charitable organization
