= Market maker =

Financial markets term

A market maker is a firm or individual that provides liquidity by regularly quoting prices at which it is willing to buy an asset (the bid) and sell it (the ask). It aims to earn the difference between those prices, known as the bid–ask spread, while managing the inventory and price risk created by its trades. By standing ready to trade on either side, market makers make it easier for other participants (such as retail or institutional investors) to buy or sell without waiting for a matching counterparty.

In U.S. markets, the U.S. Securities and Exchange Commission defines a "market maker" as a firm that stands ready to buy and sell stock on a regular and continuous basis at a publicly quoted price. A Designated Primary Market Maker (DPM) is a specialized market maker approved by an exchange to guarantee a buy or sell position in a particular assigned security, option, or option index.

== In currency exchange ==
Most foreign exchange trading firms are market makers, as are many banks. The foreign exchange market maker both buys foreign currency from clients and sells it to other clients. They derive income from the trading price differentials, helping the market by providing liquidity, reducing transaction costs, and facilitating trade.

== In stock exchange ==
Market makers that stand ready to buy and sell stocks listed on an exchange, such as the New York Stock Exchange (NYSE) or the London Stock Exchange (LSE), are called "third market makers". Most stock exchanges operate on a "matched bargain" or "order driven" basis. When a buyer's bid price meets a seller's offer price or vice versa, the stock exchange's matching system decides that a deal has been executed. In such a system, there may be no designated or official market makers, but market makers nevertheless exist.

As of October 2008, there were over two thousand market makers in the United States, and over one hundred in Canada.

=== New York ===
In the United States, the NYSE and NYSE American, among others, have designated market makers, formerly known as "specialists", who act as the official market maker for a given security. The market makers provide a required amount of liquidity to the security's market, and take the other side of trades when there are short-term buy-and-sell-side imbalances in customer orders. In return, the specialist is granted various informational and trade execution advantages.

Other U.S. exchanges, most prominently the NASDAQ stock exchange, employ several competing official market makers in a security. These market makers are required to maintain two-sided markets during exchange hours and are obligated to buy and sell at their displayed bids and offers. They typically do not receive the trading advantages a specialist does, but they do get some, such as the ability to naked short a stock, i.e., selling it without borrowing it. In most situations, only official market makers are permitted to engage in naked shorting. Changes to the rules in the 2000s and 2010s have explicitly banned naked shorting by options market makers.

In liquid markets like the NYSE, nearly every asset has open interest, providing two benefits: price takers can buy or sell at any time, and observers can continually monitor a precise price of every asset.

A prediction market, or market explicitly designed to uncover the value of an asset, relies heavily on continual price discovery holding true. Prediction markets benefit from automated market makers, or algorithmic traders that maintain constant open interest, providing needed liquidity to the markets that would be difficult to provide naturally.

Examples of New York market makers are Optiver, Jane Street Capital, Flow Traders, IMC, and Virtu Financial, according to Article 17(13) of Regulation (EU) No 236/2012 of the European Parliament and of the Council of 14 March 2012.

=== London ===
On the LSE, there are official market makers for many securities. Some of the LSE's member firms take on the obligation of always making a two-way price in each of the stocks in which they make markets. Their prices are the ones displayed on the Stock Exchange Automated Quotation (SEAQ) system and it is they who generally deal with brokers buying or selling stock on behalf of clients.

Proponents of the official market making system claim market makers add to the liquidity and depth of the market by taking a short or long position for a time, thus assuming some risk in return for the chance of a small profit. On the LSE, one can always buy and sell stock: each stock always has at least two market makers and they are obliged to deal.

In contrast, on smaller, order-driven markets such as the JSE Securities Exchange it can be difficult to determine the buying and selling prices of even a small block of stocks that lack a clear and immediate market value because there are often no buyers or sellers on the order board.

Unofficial market makers are free to operate on order driven markets or, indeed, on the LSE. They do not have the obligation to always be making a two-way price, but they do not have the advantage that everyone must deal with them either.

Examples of UK Market makers since Big Bang Day are Peel Hunt, Winterflood Securities, Liberum Capital, Shore Capital, Fairfax IS and Altium Securities.

Prior to the Big Bang, jobbers had exclusive rights of market making on the LSE.

=== Frankfurt ===
The Frankfurt Stock Exchange (FWB) runs a system of market makers appointed by the listed companies. These are called "designated sponsors". Designated Sponsors secure higher liquidity by quoting binding prices for buying and selling the shares. The largest market maker by number of mandates in Germany is ODDO BHF Corporates & Markets AG.

=== Tokyo ===
Since 2018, the Tokyo Stock Exchange has had an ETF Market Making Incentive Scheme in place, which provides incentives to designated market makers who maintain quoting obligations in qualified ETFs. This list of market makers includes Nomura Securities, Flow Traders, and Optiver.

== Decentralized network protocols ==
Liquidity provision in a decentralized network protocol, such as the trading or transacting of a cryptocurrency on an exchange, works rather differently. Decentralized markets by definition do not have official market makers, and there are no regulations enforced by centralized entities involved at the protocol level. Companies or individuals may become market makers by simply using or trading the protocol at high volumes and by providing liquidity to the protocol, typically in return for the prospect of making an ROI on the assets committed to the liquidity pools. Decentralized exchanges offer trading discounts for high-volume traders in order to encourage companies and individuals to provide liquidity as unofficial market makers.

=== Lack of regulation and oversight ===
Decentralized markets fall outside of the regulatory reach of traditional courts with jurisdiction in defined geographic boundaries. Therefore governments may have difficulty auditing, regulating or shutting down such protocols since the protocols have no central or headquarters jurisdiction in which they operate. The network operates on the principles, and according to the code, that is running on the network.

== Income of market makers ==
The income of a market maker is the difference between the bid price, the price at which the firm is willing to buy a stock, and the ask price, the price at which the firm is willing to sell it. It is known as the market-maker spread, or bid–ask spread. Supposing that equal numbers of buy and sell orders arrive and the price never changes, this is the amount that the market maker will gain on each round trip.

Market makers usually also provide liquidity to the firm's clients, for which they earn a commission.

== See also ==
- Divide and choose, analogous to a two-way price
- List of finance topics
- Sales and trading
