= Peter McCoy =

American attorney

Peter F. McCoy
- Born: 1888
- Died: July 18, 1958 (aged 69–70); New York City
- Education: Columbia University, New York Law School
- Occupation: Attorney
- Political party: Republican

Peter F. McCoy (1888 – 1958) was an American attorney based in New York City. Practicing law in New York at 342 Madison Avenue, McCoy started his legal career with Eaton, Lewis & Rowe before becoming an assistant United States Attorney in 1921. As an assistant United States Attorney General, McCoy was successful at prosecuting high-profile brokers for mail fraud and bucket shops in the early 1920s, with the New York Times proclaiming him a "foe of stock frauds." He also prosecuted people for violating the Food and Drug Acts, selling narcotics, and counterfeiting.

He resigned as assistant United States Attorney in 1925 and was appointed an assistant United States Attorney General. McCoy became a member of the law firm Ferris, Shepard, Joyce & McCoy in 1926. In 1929, he unsuccessfully bid as a Republican – Fusion candidate for Justice of the Supreme Court, First Judicial District. He was a governor of the New York Athletic Club and the National Republican Club.

== Early life and education ==
Born in 1888, Peter J. McCoy graduated in 1908 from Columbia University. He graduated from the New York Law School in 1912. He served in the Aviation Section of the Army Signal Corps in World War I.

== Career ==
=== 1910s–1923: Private practice and federal role ===
Early in his law career, he was first associated with the firm Eaton, Lewis & Rowe in New York. In 1921, he was named an assistant United States Attorney. In 1922, he was briefly assigned to Ralph A. Day as personal counsel. Day at the time was the Federal prohibition director for the state of New York. McCoy practiced law in New York at 342 Madison Avenue, later renamed the Canadian Pacific Building.

McCoy was "instrumental in breaking up the nation-wide blind pool," known as the participating syndicates in the "Ponzi System," when he prosecuted Leonard K. Hirshberg and members of the Winthrop Smith Company, leading to indictments. In September 1922 Hirshberg was convicted of defrauding investors in a mail fraud investment scam of one millions dollars.

=== 1923–1925: Blind pool case ===
As an assistant United States Attorney General, McCoy was successful at prosecuting brokers for mail fraud. Among other cases, he successfully prosecuted Austin H. Montgomery Jr. and others, who were charged with using blind pools operated by the Community Finance Corporation to defraud $3,000,000 through mail fraud. Austin H. Montgomery Jr. and William L. Cunningham were charged in February 1923 for their connection with the bankrupt Community Finance Corporation. Others indicted in the same case included John A. Berryman, for using the mails to defraud investors in connection with Fidelity Finance Company. For selling securities in a similar operation to Community Finance Corporation, Berryman surrendered to Peter J. McCoy in August 1923. In September 1923, after being accused of a $6,000,000 blind pool deal concerning the Community Finance Corporation, Montgomery was found in Quebec, Canada.

A fraud trial was ongoing as of March 1925. In early May 1925, Austin H. Montgomery Jr. and L.H. Schwartz were put on trial on an indictment "charging fraudulent use of the mails in connection with the operation of a blind pool by the Community Finance Corporation." They were both convicted on April 2, 1925 in the blind pool case on each of 8 counts, with Montgomery sentenced to five years and Schwartz 18 months. Eight people were indicted for mail fraud total on July 20, including Austin H. Montgomery Jr. of New York, by the Federal Grand Jury, after post office inspectors looked into the activities of Fidelity Finance Company. It had operated in New York, Baltimore, Wilmington in Delaware, Philadelphia, Washington, and York, Pennsylvania.

=== 1924–1926: Bucketshop case ===
With the New York Times proclaiming him a "foe of stock frauds," McCoy became known for conducting the "successful bucket shop investigation of 1924," wherein he prosecuted New York stockbroker William S. Silkworth, members of the firm Raynor, Nicholas & Truesdell, and others for operating bucketshops and bucketing. The case was instigated by events starting in February 1922, when the Consolidated Stock Exchange of New York was hit "without warning" with several brokerage and firm failures, followed by more failures in late February 1922 and mid-July 1922, shocking the industry. In July 1922, Consolidated president Silkworth conceded that some Consolidated brokers were corrupt, with reforms underway to clear the exchange of them. Others accused him of misusing the rescue fund from February, which Silkworth denied. Shortly afterwards, the assembly passed the Martin Act, which essentially banned bucketshops. Working out of the Anti-Fraud Bureau on the issue, Albert Ottinger started an investigation into the failures in earnest in late May 1923. Silkworth testified the following month, and although Assistant Attorney General William F. McKenna failed to implicate Silkworth in the Fuller bankruptcy, he did uncover irregularities in Silkworth's personal finances.

Silkworth and others were then prosecuted by McCoy. After Silkworth and seven others were indicted in late May 1924 for connection with the bankruptcy of Raynor, Nicholas & Truesdell, Silkworth pleaded not guilty on May 29, 1924 while held on $8,500 on bail. Trial was set for August. On November 29, 1924, Silkworth was convicted of the fraudulent use of mails in bucketing operations, as well as five others also found guilty of bucketing. In particular, Silkworth was convicted of mail fraud relating to his brokerage and the brokerage house of Raynor, Nicholas and Truesdell in 1922. During the appeal process, McCoy gave testimony before the Circuit Court of Appeals that Raynor, Nicholas & Truesdell had engaged in extensive bucketing operations since its founding late 1920. McCoy further testified that Silkworth had provided the firm's bucketing operations with the protection of Consolidated. The Judge ruled against the motion raised by defendants, which was that bucketing did not have a Federal statute against it at the time, and ruled in favor of McCoy on February 1, 1926 with the November conviction upheld. Silkworth served three months of a year sentence in 1926, with other brokers also serving time.

=== 1925-1950s: Later cases and run for office ===
According to the New York Times, McCoy prosecuted many people who were accused of violating the Food and Drug Acts, selling narcotics, and counterfeiting. McCoy also prosecuted those indicted in the Crager System, or "glass casket case," for "fraudulently using the mails in the sale of stock of the concern." He resigned as assistant United States Attorney in 1925. A month later, McCoy was appointed an assistant United States Attorney General.

McCoy became a member of the law firm Ferris, Shepard, Joyce & McCoy in 1926. The General Electric Company, General Vehicle Corporation, Commonwealth Edison Corporation and the Insull public utilities had all employed him as a member of counsel. He was a Republican – Fusion candidate for Justice of the Supreme Court, First Judicial District in 1929, and was unsuccessful in his bid. In 1930 he began representing large realty companies as both a director and as an attorney. The tenants of the Marguery Hotel hired him in 1947 as their attorney.

== Personal life ==
McCoy was a governor of the New York Athletic Club and the National Republican Club. He was also a member of the Artists and Writers Club, Columbia Club, Friendly Sons of St. Patrick, Westchester Country Club, and the Old Guard Society of Palm Beach. At the time of his death in Lawrence Hospital on July 18, 1958, he was living at 811 Palmer Road in New York City. His widow was Grace McCoy.

== See also ==
- Fuller case
