= Raynor, Nicholas & Truesdell =

Controversial brokerage of 1920s New York, US

- Type: Brokerage
- Industry: Financial services
- Founded: 1920
- Defunct: March 29, 1922
- Fate: Failed in 1922, partners indicted for bucketing
- Headquarters: 42 Broadway and 30 E. 42nd Street, Manhattan, New York City, United States
- Key people: D. C. Raynor, E. H. Truesdell, B. J. Nicholas
- Products: Stockbrokerage

Raynor, Nicholas & Truesdell was a New York brokerage based on Broadway in the 1920s. It was a member of the Consolidated Stock Exchange, before failing on April 29, 1922. The failure resulted in a highly publicized lawsuit over whether the firm committed mail fraud and bucketing before failing.

== History ==
=== Founding and failure ===
The brokerage firm was founded in 1920 in New York. According to records, as early as November 21, 1921, Consolidated had discussed the firm's methods, as it was known for bucketing.

As of 1922, it was based at 42 Broadway and 30 East 42nd Street, and were members of the Consolidated Stock Exchange of New York. Firm members included D. C. Raynor, E. H. Truesdell, and B. J. Nicholas. The firm soon ran into financial difficulties. In November 1923 at the bankruptcy hearing, speculator Louis B. Appleton told that he and his brother Charles put up $50,000 before the failure as an advance to the firm, to help keep it afloat.

The firm failed on April 29, 1922. In October 1923, testimony about the firm revealed that it failed in April 1922 for $4,000,000, and that the committee of the Consolidated Exchange had been aware of its failing condition six weeks before that. The failure amount was in 1924 reported as "more than $2,000,000."

=== Bucketing and fraud charges ===
In December 1923, De Witt C. Raynor was indicted by the Federal Grand Jury in connection with the failure, after testifying that May. When the hearing resumed the following June, he had disappeared, failing to answer to a subpoena. He was still missing by July 1923, when he should have surrendered for his arrest. On January 23, 1924, it was revealed after an examination of the books that Raynor, Nicholas Truesdell owed $1,250,000 to be divided among 2,500 customers, and had $80,000 in assets. That day, several curb brokers were called in to testify on their dealings with the firm's check history. On February 1, 1924, De Witt Raynor walked into the office of the United States Marshal in Havana and surrendered himself, disclaiming any voluntary violation of the law. On November 6, 1924, De Witt C. Raynor pleaded guilty before a federal judge on charges of conspiracy and using the mails to defraud. Other co-defendants at the time included William Silkworth, Louis Gilbough of Consolidated, Blaine J. Nicholas and Earl H. Truesdell, and several others including Peter Owens, office manager of the Raynor firm. Lawyer Peter McCoy was prosecutor.

On November 29, 1924, Silkworth and five others also found guilty of bucketing, with Silkworth convicted of mail fraud relating to his brokerage and Raynor, Nicholas and Truesdell in 1922. During the appeal process, McCoy gave testimony before the Circuit Court of Appeals that Raynor, Nicholas & Truesdell had engaged in extensive bucketing operations since its founding late 1920. McCoy further testified that Silkworth had provided the firm's bucketing operations with the protection of Consolidated. The Judge ruled against the motion raised by defendants, which was that bucketing did not have a Federal statute against it at the time, and ruled in favor of McCoy on February 1, 1926 with the November conviction upheld. Silkworth served three months of a year sentence in 1926, with other brokers also serving time.

== See also ==
- Edward M. Fuller & Company
- Fuller case
