= Corporate action =

Event initiated by a public company

A corporate action is an event initiated by a public company that brings or could bring an actual change to the debt securities—equity or debt—issued by the company. Corporate actions are typically agreed upon by a company's board of directors and authorized by the shareholders. For some events, shareholders or bondholders are permitted to vote on the event. Examples of corporate actions include stock splits, dividends, mergers and acquisitions, rights issues, and spin-offs.

Some corporate actions such as a dividend (for equity securities) or coupon payment (for debt securities) may have a direct financial impact on the shareholders or bondholders; another example is a call (early redemption) of a debt security. Other corporate actions such as stock split may have an indirect financial impact, as the increased liquidity of shares may cause the price of the stock to decrease. Some corporate actions, such as name changes or ticker symbol changes to better reflect a company's business focus, have no direct financial impact on the shareholders; securities may be listed under a different security identifier (e.g. ISIN, CUSIP, Sedol) however. For example, "Apple Computers" changed its name to Apple Inc.

== Overview ==
=== Types ===
There are three types of corporate actions: voluntary, mandatory, and mandatory with choice.

- Mandatory corporate action: A mandatory corporate action is an event initiated by the board of directors of the corporation that affects all shareholders. Participation of shareholders are mandatory for these corporate actions. An example of a mandatory corporate action is cash dividend. A shareholder does not need to act to receive the dividend. Other examples of mandatory corporate actions include stock splits, mergers, pre-refunding, return of capital, bonus issue, asset ID change, and spin-offs. Strictly speaking, the word "mandatory" is not appropriate because the shareholder is not required to do anything; the shareholder is just a passive beneficiary in all the cases cited above. There is nothing the shareholder has to do or does in a Mandatory Corporate Action.
- Voluntary corporate action: A voluntary corporate action is an action where the shareholders elect to participate in the action. A response is required for the corporation to process the action. An example of a voluntary corporate action is a tender offer. A corporation may request shareholders to tender their shares at a predetermined price. The shareholder may or may not participate in the tender offer. Shareholders send their responses to the corporation's agents, and the corporation will send the proceeds of the action to the shareholders who elect to participate.
- Mandatory with choice corporate action: This corporate action is a mandatory corporate action where shareholders are given a chance to choose among several options. An example is cash or stock dividend option with one of the options as default. Shareholders may or may not submit their elections. In case a shareholder does not submit the election, the default option will be applied.

Some market participants use a different method to distinguish the corporate action types. For example, "mandatory corporate action" and "mandatory with choice corporate action" may be used together. DTC uses the terms distributions, redemptions and reorganizations.

=== Purpose ===
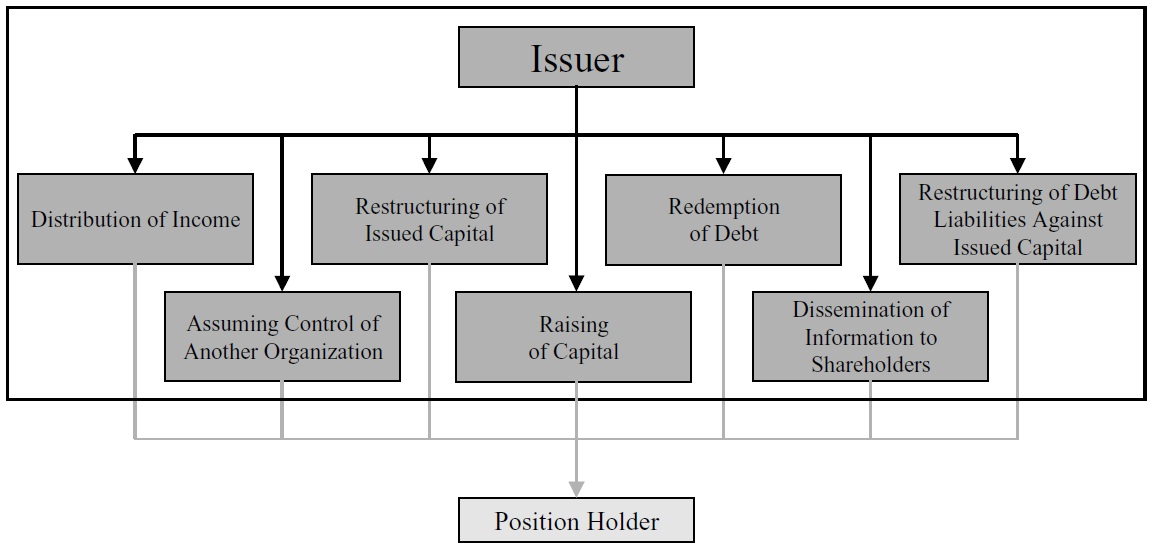
Purpose of corporate actions

The primary reasons companies use corporate actions are:

- Return profits to shareholders: Cash dividends are a classic example where a public company declares a dividend to be paid on each outstanding share. Bonus is another case where the shareholder is rewarded. In a stricter sense, the bonus issue should not impact the share price but in reality, in rare cases, it does and results in an overall increase in value.
- Influence the share price: If the price of a stock is too high or too low, the liquidity of the stock suffers. Stocks priced too high will not be affordable to all investors and stocks priced too low may be delisted. Corporate actions such as stock splits or reverse stock splits increase or decrease the number of outstanding shares to decrease or increase the stock price respectively. Buybacks are another example of influencing the stock price where a corporation buys back shares from the market in an attempt to reduce the number of outstanding shares thereby increasing the price.
- Corporate restructuring: Corporations restructure in order to increase profitability. Examples include mergers (where two companies that are competitive or complementary join forces) and spin-offs (where a company breaks itself up in order to focus on its core competencies).

=== Impact ===
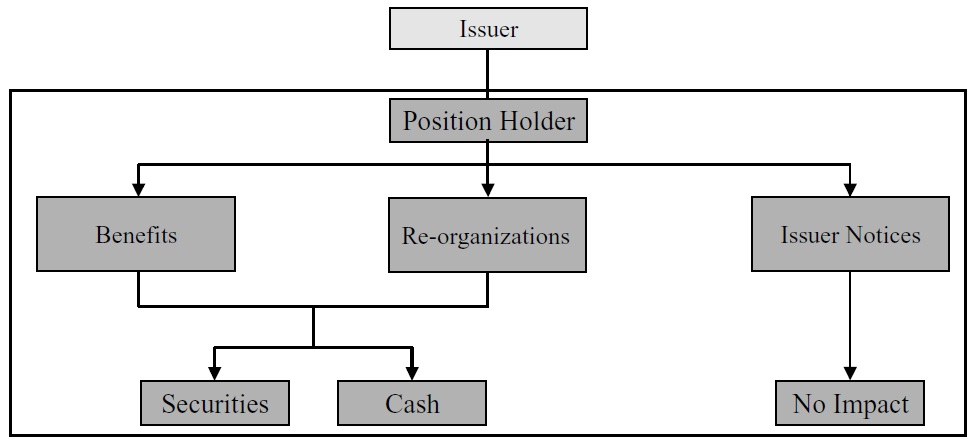
Beneficial impact of corporate actions

As an owner, the impact of a corporate action is usually measured in terms of changes to the securities and/or cash positions, so corporate actions can be divided into two categories:

- Benefits: Actions that result in an increase to the position holder’s securities or cash position, without altering the underlying security. Examples include bonus issues, which is a Mandatory With Options Action/Event.
- Reorganizations: Actions that reshape or restructure the beneficial owner's underlying securities position, which sometimes also results in a cash payout. Examples include equity restructures, conversions, and subscriptions.

== Notification requirement ==
In order to keep investors and the market informed of corporate actions, they need to be announced. For public companies listed on exchanges, the exchanges themselves handle the announcement, notifying shareholders as well as making information about the corporate action available online. For companies that trade in the over-the-counter (OTC) marketplace, U.S. federal securities regulators task Financial Industry Regulatory Authority (FINRA), a self-regulatory organization, with processing the corporate action announcement.

The event information flow for public companies where shareholders or bondholders can vote usually involves numerous parties. The information is first announced by the company to the exchange. Financial data companies which provide economic and financial data to customers collect such information and disseminate it via their own services to banks, institutional investors, managed service providers, and other market participants. In addition, the central securities depository (CSD) of the respective market collects the data and informs the CSD participants holding the respective share or bond in custody about the upcoming corporate action. The CSD sets a deadline for its participants by which the elections must be returned. The CSD participants then further disseminate the information to its clients (e.g. banks, institutional investors or private clients), which in turn must submit their election by the deadline set by the CSD participant.
