= William Fallon =

William Fallon could refer to:

- William H. Fallon, former mayor of St. Paul, Minnesota
- William J. Fallon (attorney) (1886–1937), American criminal defense attorney
- William J. Fallon (born 1944), United States Navy admiral
- Bill Fallon (1939-1998), Australian rules footballer
