= Share price =

Term in finance

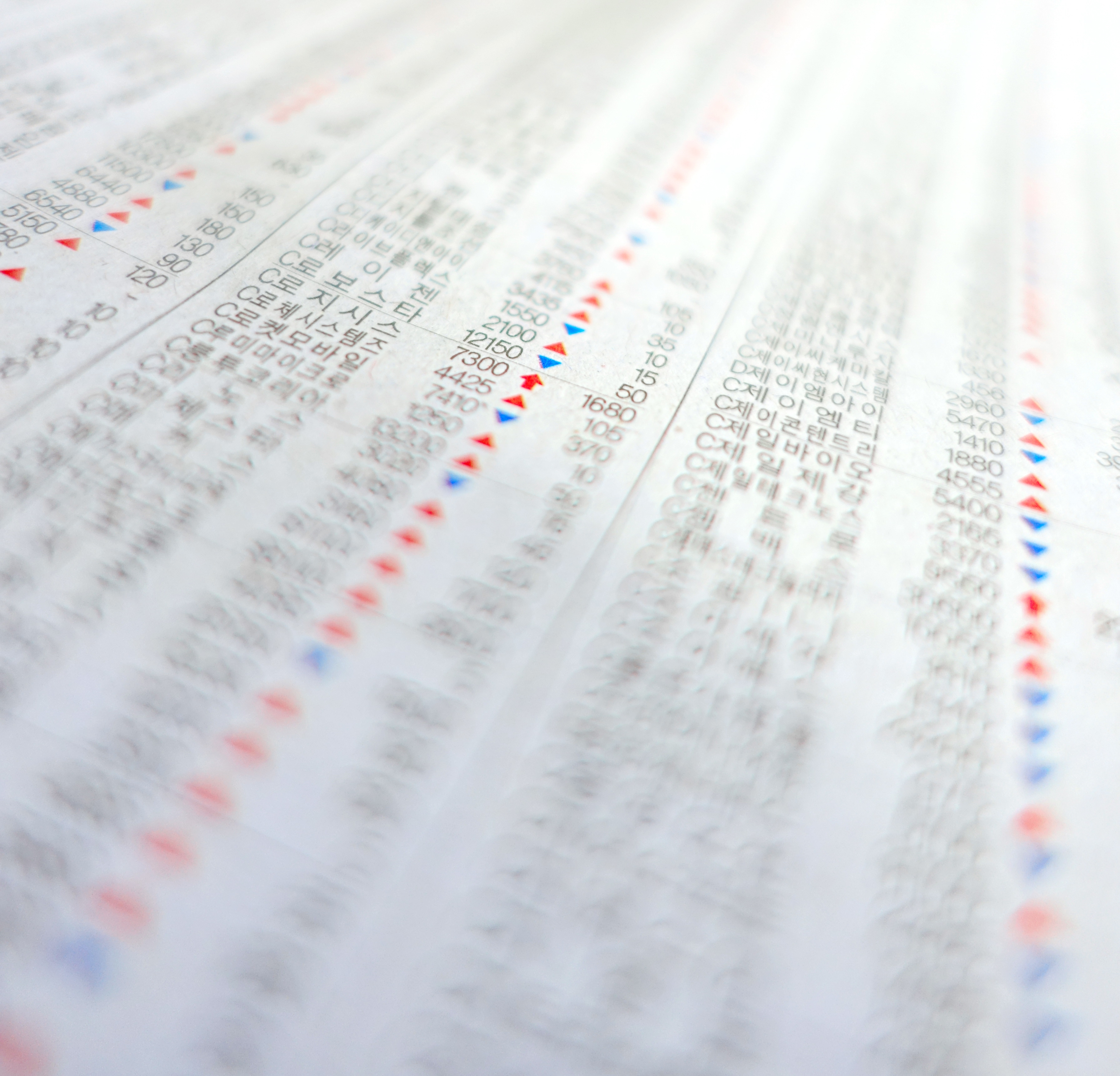
Share prices in a newspaper

A share price is the price of a single share of a number of saleable equity shares of a company. In layman's terms, the stock price is the highest amount someone is willing to pay for the stock, or the lowest amount that it can be bought for.

== Behaviour of share prices ==
In economics and financial theory, analysts use random walk techniques to model behavior of asset prices, in particular share prices of companies publicly listed. This practice has its basis in the presumption that investors act rationally and without biases, and that at any moment they estimate the value of an asset based on future expectations. Under these conditions, all existing information affects the price, which changes only when new information comes out. By definition, new information appears randomly and influences the asset price randomly.

Empirical studies have demonstrated that prices do not completely follow random walks. Low serial correlations (around 0.05) exist in the short term, and slightly stronger correlations over the longer term. Their sign and the strength depend on a variety of factors.

Researchers have found that some of the biggest price deviations from random walks result from seasonal and temporal patterns. In particular, returns in January significantly exceed those in other months (January effect) and on Mondays stock prices go down more than on any other day. Observers have noted these effects in many different markets for more than half a century, but without succeeding in giving a completely satisfactory explanation for their persistence.

Technical analysis uses most of the anomalies to extract information on future price movements from historical data. Technical analysis also takes market sentiment into account. But some economists, for example Eugene Fama, argue that most of these patterns occur accidentally, rather than as a result of irrational or inefficient behavior of investors: the huge amount of data available to researchers for analysis allegedly causes the fluctuations.

Another school of thought, behavioral finance, attributes non-randomness to investors' cognitive and emotional biases. This can be contrasted with fundamental analysis.

When viewed over long periods, the share price is related to expectations of future earnings and dividends of the firm. Over short periods, especially for younger or smaller firms, the relationship between share price and dividends can be quite unmatched.

== Share prices in the United States ==
Many U.S.-based companies seek to keep their share price (also called stock price) low, partly based on round lot trading (multiples of 100 shares). A corporation can adjust its stock price by a stock split, substituting a quantity of shares at one price for a different number of shares at an adjusted price where the value of shares x price remains equivalent. (For example, 500 shares at $32 may become 1000 shares at $16.) Many major firms like to keep their price in the $25 to $75 price range.

A US share must be priced at $1 or more to be covered by NASDAQ. If the share price falls below that level, the stock is "delisted" and becomes an OTC (over the counter stock). A stock must have a price of $1 or more for 10 consecutive trading days during each month to remain listed.

== Most expensive shares ==
The highest share prices on the NYSE have been those of Berkshire Hathaway class A, trading at over $625,000/share (in February 2024). Berkshire Hathaway has refused to split its stock and make it more affordable to retail investors, as they want to attract shareholders with a long-term vision. In 1996, Berkshire Hathaway issued the class B shares that come with 1/1000 of the value and 1/1500 of the voting rights in order to avoid the formation of mutual funds that buy class A shares.

Lindt & Sprüngli shares topped out at approximately $140,000 (December 2021). Like Berkshire Hathaway, the Swiss chocolate manufacturer issued so-called Partizipationsschein shares, valued at 1/100 of the original share value, and come void of voting rights.

=== List of historical highest-priced publicly traded shares ===
Company	Price (US$)	Date	Industry Notes	Country
Berkshire Hathaway	628,900	February 2024	holding company Most expensive share in the world.	United States
Lindt & Sprüngli	140,000	December 2021	chocolate manufacture Most expensive European share.	Switzerland
Bastfaserkontor	11,435	March 2022	small real estate company Company name: See "bast fibre kontor". 10,000 shares in circulation.	Germany
Berlin Zoo	9,365	June 2021	zoo 4000 shares in circulation.	Germany
Financière Moncey	8,711	September 2021	holding company; specializing in urban public transport Strongly connected to the Bolloré enterprise.	France
NVR, Inc.	7,617	February 2024	home construction, mortgage banking	United States
Zuger Kantonalbank	7,200	May 2022	state bank of the Canton of Zug	Switzerland
Swiss National Bank	6,371	February 2022	central bank	Switzerland
Reederei Herbert Ekkenga	6,000	February 2025	tourist ships on the Zwischenahner Meer	Germany
Booking Holdings	5,337	December 2024	Travel	United States
Seaboard Corporation	4,650	April 2019	agriculture, shipping, electricity	United States
Berkeley Group Holdings	4,484	April 2022	house building, real estate	United Kingdom
Financière des Sucres	4,355	April 2022	sugar refinery, sugar trade	Belgium
Ultra Electronics Holding	4,330	April 2022	defense and security equipment	United Kingdom
Givaudan	4,017	April 2022	flavours and fragrances	Switzerland
Wizz Air Holdings plc	3,776	April 2022	low cost airline	Jersey (United Kingdom)
Amazon	3,515	November 2021	online commerce	United States
Alphabet Inc.	2,960	October 2021	information technology	United States
Auto Zone	2,842	February 2024	auto parts	United States
Texas Pacific Land Corporation	2,715	November 2022	land management, water services	United States
Société Générale de Surveillance	2,696	April 2022	inspection, certification, testing	Switzerland
Chipotle Mexican Grill	2,666	February 2024	restaurant chain	United States
Barry Callebaut	2,513	August 2021	cocoa	Switzerland

== History ==
Robert D. Coleman's Evolution of Stock Pricing notes that the invention of double-entry bookkeeping in the fourteenth century led to company valuations being based upon ratios such as price per unit of earnings (from the income statement), price per unit of net worth (from the balance sheet) and price per unit of cash flow (from the funds statement). The next advance was to price individual shares rather than whole companies. A price/dividends ratio began to be used. Following this, the next stage was the use of discounted cash flows, based on the time value of money, to estimate the intrinsic value of stock.

== See also ==
- Common stock
- Share capital
- Market capitalization
- Share repurchase
