= Odd lot (disambiguation) =

Odd lotter is an investor who purchases shares or other securities in small or unusual quantities.

Odd lot may also refer to:

- Odd Lots, a retail store; see Big Lots
- OddLot Entertainment, American production company
