= Edward Simmons =

Edward Simmons may refer to:

- Edward Simmons (painter) (1852–1931), American impressionist painter
- Edward E. Simmons (1911–2004), American electrical engineer
- Edward H. H. Simmons (1876–1955), American banker and president of the NYSE
- J. Edward Simmons (1841–1910), American lawyer and banker
- Ed Simmons (born 1963), American football player
