= Eugene McGee =

Eugene McGee may refer to:

- Eugene McGee (American football) (1882–1952), American lawyer and college football player and coach
- Eugene McGee (sports administrator) (1941–2019), Irish Gaelic footballer and manager
- Eugene McGee, lawyer involved in a hit-and-run, see Kapunda Road Royal Commission
