= Seymour L. Cromwell =

American banker (1871–1925)

President of the New York Stock Exchange
- In office May 1921 – May 1924
- Preceded by: William H. Remick
- Succeeded by: Edward H. H. Simmons

Personal details
- Born: Seymour LeGrand Cromwell; April 24, 1871 Brooklyn, New York, U.S.
- Died: September 16, 1925 (aged 54) Morristown, New Jersey, U.S.
- Spouse: Agnes Mabel Whitney (m. 1899)
- Relations: Seymour Cromwell (grandson)
- Children: 4
- Parent(s): Frederic Cromwell; Esther Whitmore Husted Cromwell
- Education: Harvard College; University of Berlin

Seymour LeGrand Cromwell (April 24, 1871 – September 16, 1925) was an American banker who served as president of the New York Stock Exchange.

== Early life ==
Cromwell was born in Brooklyn, New York on April 24, 1871. He was the eldest son of Esther Whitmore (née Husted) Cromwell (1846–1909) and Frederic Cromwell (1843–1914), a trustee of the Mutual Life Insurance Company. His younger brother was Ellis Bowman Cromwell, who died aged 17 in 1892, and his younger twin sisters, Dorothea Katharine Cromwell and Gladys Louise Husted Cromwell. Another sister, Mary Cromwell lived at 46 Rue Spontini in Paris. During World War I, twins Dorothea and Gladys volunteered with the Red Cross and, reportedly due to the strain of the hospital work, the 22 year-olds committed suicide in January 1919 by jumping from the deck of the French passenger ship La Lorraine as the steamer was in the Garonne river and they were on their way home to New York. Three months later they were buried in France with military honors and the French Government awarded them the Croix de Guerre and the Médaille de la Reconnaissance française."

His paternal grandparents were Mary Jane (née Kendall) Husted and Seymour Legrand Husted, one of the wealthiest men in Brooklyn who served as president of the Brooklyn City Railroad and of the Dime Saving Bank.

Cromwell received his education at Harvard College and the University of Berlin.

== Career ==
After college, Cromwell worked for railroad, banking and industrial corporations in clerical capacities. In 1896, he began his career on the Stock Exchange as a partner in the firm of Strong, Sturgis & Co., remaining with them until January 1, 1925. During Spanish–American War, Cromwell fought with Troop A (Squadron A). In recognition of his work with French orphans after World War I, he was made an Officer of the Legion of Honor by the French Government.

In April 1921, he was selected to succeed William H. Remick as president the New York Stock Exchange. Cromwell, a member of the Exchange since 1896, had previously been on the Board of Governors of the Exchange since May 1914. He served three terms as president and was succeeded by Edward H. H. Simmons in May 1924. While president of the Exchange, he was focused on ways to end stock swindles, and was noted "for his campaign against bucket shops." Through his efforts, he caused the Better Business Bureau of New York to be formed. In 1925, Cromwell advanced the idea that Wall Street was "making 'vital efforts to realize in fact many of the aims so much talked about during the war, and the economic and social ideals urged by the liberals.'"

=== Later career ===
After his retirement from the presidency of the Exchange, he focused on his own business as a partner in the firm of Strong, Sturgis & Co., with offices as 11 Wall Street. On January 1, 1925, he became a member of the odd lot brokerage firm of Carlisle, Mellick & Co., with offices at 41 Exchange Place.

== Personal life ==
On November 29, 1899, Cromwell married Agnes Mabel Whitney (1874–1959), a suffragist who later became a poet and author. A descendant of prominent merchant Stephen Whitney, she was a daughter of Stephen Suydam Whitney and Josephine (née Thomson) Whitney. She was a niece of Mary Stuart Whitney Kernochan (wife of J. Frederic Kernochan) and among her siblings was sister, Mary Stuart Whitney (wife of Robert Livingston Stevens; son of Edwin Augustus Stevens and Martha Bayard Stevens) and brothers, New Jersey Senator Arthur Whitney and Stephen Suydam Whitney Jr. (husband of Louise Mott Bell; niece of Isaac Bell Jr. and great-granddaughter of Dr. Valentine Mott). Together, they were the parents of four sons:

- Frederic Cromwell (1900–1973), who married Caroline Cooper Prentice (1901–1957) in 1923. They divorced in 1925 and he remarried Cornelia Livingston (1903–1975), a daughter of Goodhue Livingston, in 1927. In 1947, they too divorced, and in 1948 he married Iris Barnett Lyon.
- Seymour Legrand Cromwell Jr. (1902–1965), who married Leta Clews (1912–1991), a grandniece of Henry Clews, in 1936. (Note: Leta Clews (1912–1991) was the daughter of James Blanchard Clews and Leta Nichols Livingston Clews. Her father's second wife was Mary Ann Payne (1890–1973) of Baltimore. After Leta's father died in 1934, Mary Ann married George Blumenthal in December 1935. After Blumenthal, a banker and one‐time president of the Metropolitan Museum of Art, died in 1941, she married Gen. Ralph K. Robertson. After Robertson died in 1964, she married Russian Baron Charles P. von Wrangell-Rokassowsky in 1968.) They divorced and he remarried to Olivia (née Morgan) Knight (1916–1972), the widow of Harry Hall Knight, in 1951.
- Whitney Cromwell (1904–1930), who died of pneumonia while on vacation in Tunisia at the age of 25. A graduate of Harvard, he was studying at the École des Beaux-Arts in Paris before his death.
- John Cromwell (1914–1979), an actor and playwright who made his Broadway debut in 1935 in the play The Old Maid.

In New York City, they resided at 169 East 74th Street (previously at 8 East 53rd Street), and had a country estate in Mendham, New Jersey that was gifted to Cromwell in 1892 by his father. The 112-acre estate featured a forty-seven room Georgian-style mansion in Somerset Hills, New Jersey. In 1927, his widow sold their New Jersey estate to the Sisters of Christian Charity (as a retreat and guest house) for $50,000, and later moved to 993 Park Avenue.

Cromwell died at the Morristown Hospital on September 16, 1925, at the age of 54, after he was thrown from a horse while riding near Bernardsville. The Exchange closed so members could attend his services at St. Bartholomew's Church, followed by burial at Green-Wood Cemetery in Brooklyn. His wife inherited his whole estate. After his death, his widow "maintained her civic commitments, supporting women's issues as well as national and local unemployment relief efforts" before her death on May 15, 1959. She was the first woman to serve on the New Jersey State Board of Education and the first on the New Jersey State Hospital Board.

=== Descendants ===
Through his eldest son, he was a grandfather of champion oarsman Seymour Legrand Cromwell II (1934–1977), a Princeton graduate and naval architect who helped the United States win a silver medal in the 1964 Olympics in Tokyo.

Business positions
| Preceded by William H. Remick | President of the New York Stock Exchange; 1921 – 1924 | Succeeded by Edward H. H. Simmons |
