= Consolidated Stock Exchange of New York =

Former US stock exchange

- New York Consolidated Stock Exchange
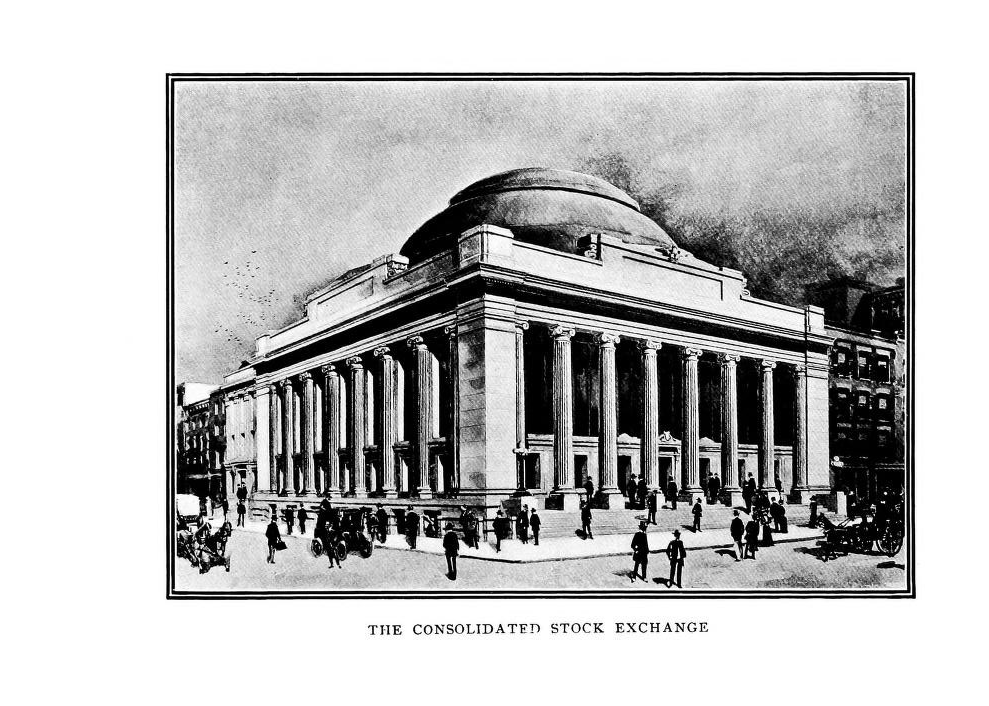
- Type: Stock exchange
- Location: New York City, United States
- Founded: 1885
- Closed: 1926
- Currency: USD

The Consolidated Stock Exchange of New York, also known as the New York Consolidated Stock Exchange or Consolidated, was a stock exchange in New York City, New York, in direct competition to the New York Stock Exchange (NYSE) from 1885 to 1926. It was formed from the merger of other smaller exchanges, and was referred to in the industry and press as the "Little Board." By its official formation in 1885, its membership of 2403 was considered the second largest membership of any exchange in the United States.

== History ==
=== 1875–1900: Background and formation ===
The New York Mining Stock Exchange opened for active business on November 1, 1875 at noon, with John Stanton Jr. as president. Total membership equaled 25. As the exchange expanded, it moved from 24 Pine Street to 32 Pine Street, and then to 18 Broad Street, and finally to the "Bond Room" of the New York Stock Exchange at 16 New Street. The exchange returned to 60 Broadway on July 26, 1877, on which day it also absorbed the members of the American Mining and Stock Exchange, which had been operating for around fifteen months. In 1883 the Mining Stock Exchange and the National Petroleum Exchange were consolidated, becoming the New-York Mining Stock and National Petroleum Exchange. On March 24, 1883, the New-York Mining and National Petroleum Exchange had a membership of 479. The exchange also absorbed the competing organizations Miscellaneous Security Board and the New York Petroleum Exchange and Stock Board.

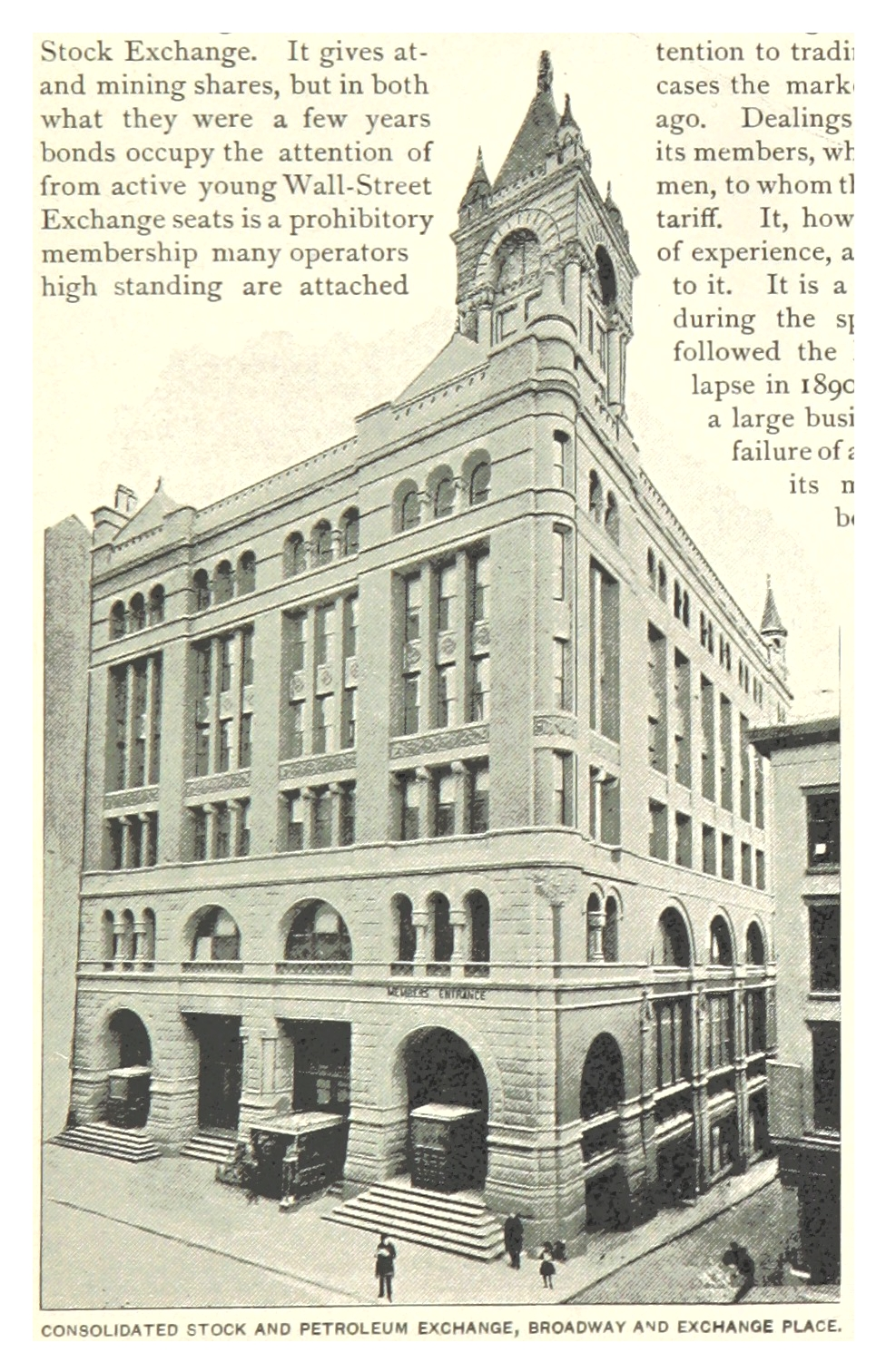
Consolidated Stock and Petroleum Exchange, Broadway and Exchange Pl, c. 1890

The New-York Mining and National Petroleum Exchange merged with the New-York Petroleum Exchange and Stock Board on February 28, 1885. The new institution was named the Consolidated Stock and Petroleum Exchange, also referred to as the Consolidated Stock and Petroleum Exchange of New York. The institution would later be renamed the Consolidated Stock Exchange of New York. By its official formation in 1885, its memberships of 2403 was considered the largest membership of any exchange in the United States, excluding the New York Produce Exchange. 400 of those members were also members of the New York Stock Exchange (NYSE). From its inception, Consolidated employed then cutting edge clearing house techniques which were efficient at preventing frauds and the reneging on bargains. Consolidated's initial business included mining stocks and petroleum pipe-line certificates, and in 1885 the sales of mining stocks amounted to 2,057,319 shares. In 1885, there was also a demand by the exchange's members for the creation of a department to deal in railroad stocks. After attempts to negotiate trade areas with the NYSE, Consolidated made the decision to "accept any trade that could be obtained." By March 20, 1886, the membership of the Consolidated Stock and Petroleum Exchange of New York was 2,403, where it remained limited. In 1886, 6,509,481 mining stocks were sold in the Consolidated exchange, and the following year, 10,659,711. Also in 1887, trading in pipe-line certificates came to 1,254,708,000. On September 8, 1887 the corner stone of the building was put in place on the corner of Broadway and Exchange Place in Manhattan.

=== 1900–1922: Bucket-shop disputes and World War I ===
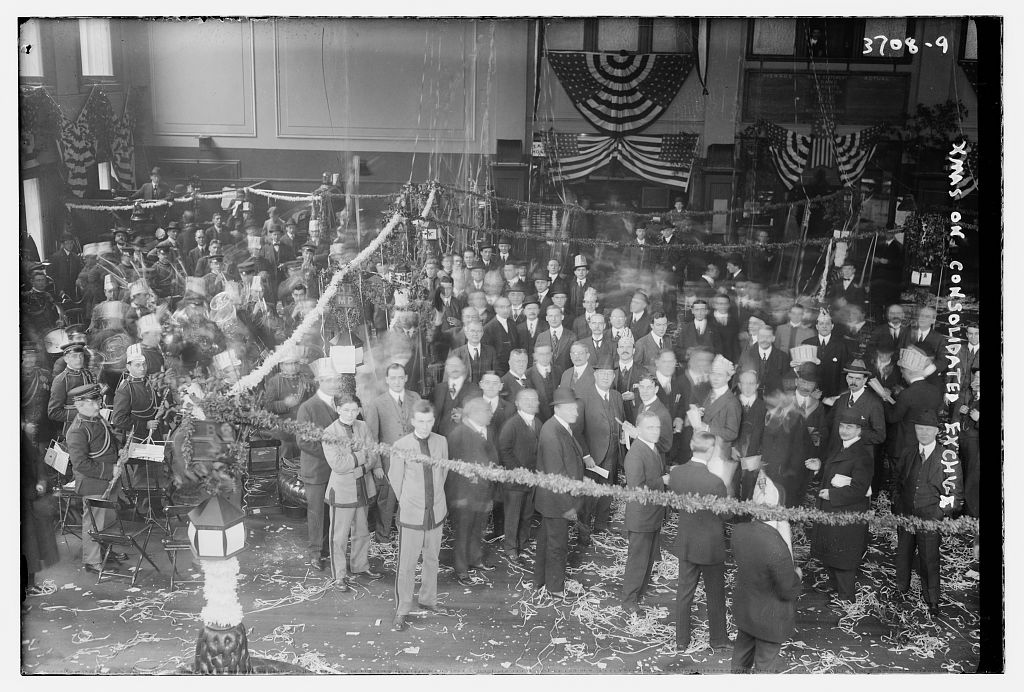
Christmas at the Consolidated Stock Exchange in 1915

On May 4, 1900, representatives of the Consolidated Stock Exchange of New York appeared before the Ways and Means Committee to appeal for the repeal of the War Revenue Act of 1898, in particular how it applied to stock transactions. On June 11, 1900, Mortimer H. Wagar defeated Charles G. Wilson for the presidency of the Consolidated Stock and Petroleum Exchange with "a large majority of the members" supporting him. One of his first orders of business was the extermination of bucket shops. Wagar was re-elected president in 1901 and 1902, while Lewis V.F. Randolph was president for 1903, 1904 and 1905. By 1904, bucket shops had become a point of contention among the voting members of the Consolidated Stock and Petroleum Exchange. Wagar remained strongly against their use, in opposition to the Exchange's governors. By 1907, total membership was approximately 1,300.

In 1909, the Consolidated's competition with the NYSE came to a head, when the NYSE attempted to remove Consolidated tickers from the NYSE board. As Consolidated relied on the NYSE for price discovery, it went to the courts, and "thwarted," the NYSE "vowed to drive the Consolidated Exchange out of business". Afterwards, the NYSE enforced a resolution that NYSE president James B. Mabon described as "to prevent a man who is a member of another exchange from doing any business at all, and to drive him out of business." Although the Consolidated exchange continued to prosper, the quality of its member brokerages did begin to deteriorate prior to 1922.

According to a later president of the exchange, in 1913, "during the regime of President De AGuerro, that the bucket shop laws were amended so as to make them more effective. The Exchange at that time advocated and had passed bills that required the name of the broker whom the stock was bought or to whom it was sold; also the date and time of day the order was executed." The president's report on May 31, 1917, addressed World War I and the sinking of neutral vessels by German U- boats. President de Aguero noted there was a membership of about 480 in the Exchange, with that number virtually fixed by the board. The president's report on May 31, 1918, noted the Exchange had been co-operating with Red Cross Work, and noted the members who had joined the war effort.

In February 1922 all trading records at Consolidated were broken, at a time when the NYSE had low volume, ensuring that president W. S. Silkworth, "not [NYSE president McCormick], was the talk of Wall Street."

=== 1922: Brokerage failures ===
In February 1922, the Consolidated was hit "without warning" with several brokerage and firm failures within the exchange. The firms told exchange president Silkworth they needed additional capital to remain in business, and Silkworth raised a fund from the exchange members of $102,000. Several of the firms collapsed anyway, particularly R. H. MacMasters & Company, which failed in late February 1922. The failures shocked the industry. At the time there were calls in the New York State Assembly to ban bucket shops, making an investigation into Consolidated a topical political issue for Democratic gubernatorial candidate Alfred E. Smith. In July 1922, Silkworth conceded that some Consolidated brokers were corrupt and that he was working to clear the exchange of them. Others accused him of misusing the rescue fund from February, with Silkworth denying the allegations in the press. However, rumors persisted that Silkworth was considering resigning and leaving the country, which Silkworth again denied. In mid-July, a new series of unexpected failures occurred at Consolidated, including Edward M. Fuller & Company. George Silkworth, William Silkworth's brother, had been a partner at Fuller, leading to further accusations of insider corruption. William Silkworth continued to work on his reform program, and shortly afterwards, the assembly passed the Martin Act, which essentially banned bucketshops.

=== 1923–1925: Investigation ===
Albert Ottinger began working on the Fuller investigation in December 1922 out of the Anti-Fraud Bureau. Afterwards, a panic at Consolidated resulted in further houses failing, which Silkworth claimed was a result of his reform efforts. He was re-elected in April 1923 to president, promising to cooperate with authorities in ridding the exchange of corruption.

In April 1923, it was reported that lawyer Henry W. Sykes had sent a letter to Attorney General Carl Sherman requesting a conference over investigation into "allegations that the Consolidated Stock Exchange was the headquarters of bucket shop operations." The Ottinger investigation officially began in late May. In June 1923, the exchange was widely covered in the press when a court case resulted from the Fuller bankruptcy. Silkworth testified on June 6. Although Assistant Attorney General William F. McKenna failed to implicate Silkworth in the Fuller bankruptcy, he did uncover irregularities in Silkworth's personal finances. The irregularities showed he had made large deposits in March 1922, some related to the Fuller account. Silkworth resigned on June 21, 1923.

On July 1, 1923, the exchange's board of governors increased the membership rate of the month from $35 to $40. The rate hike was explained as a result of higher daily expenses at the exchange. He also described harsher membership criteria, with the exchange president stating "the doors are closed on our Exchange to those men seeking admission to membership who have no legal or moral right to be brokers and handle the funds of customers." On July 5, 1923, the Consolidated's board of governors agreed to allow the Committee on Ways and Means to "make an investigation of any firm or member [of the exchange] against whom a complaint has been filed by the Attorney General." An internal report examining the affairs of the exchange was released on November 8, 1923. The report recommended changes to the by-laws, which were ratified by the exchange's board of governors. On February 4, 1924, president Laurence Tweedy announced changes to the exchange constitution, requiring all member applicants to give their full business histories. Several committees within the exchange were also combined. On December 28, 1924, exchange president Thomas B. Maloney announced the appointment of a special legislative committee to "consider all legislation affecting the brokerage business." L. B. Wilson was appointed the committee's chairman, who was also chairman of the exchange's law committee. Stated Maloney that day, Wilson "was one of the members of a committee which went to Washington from the Exchange several years ago and succeeded, virtually single-handed, in having the stock loan tax bill repealed. In January 1925, there was a "reduction in the membership limit and a tightening of the rules governing the admission of new members."

After starting the examination in March 1925, on June 26, 1925, the Internal Revenue Bureau of the U.S. Department of the Treasury told exchange Thomas B. Maloney that it launched an investigation into whether "the Federal Government has lost hundreds of thousands of dollars in the last two years through the failure of some members of the Consolidated Stock Exchange to place tax stamps on stock transfers as required by law." According to federal law at the time, $2 of stamps must be affixed to "every 100 shares of stock sold." Out of 335 active members of the Consolidated, the government reported that 143 were suspected of not using stamps, and of those, 20 had already settled with the government. That day, however, Chief Agent Gugh McQuillan stated that "no evidence of deliberate fraud by tax-dodging brokers had so far been uncovered."

On December 30, 1925, the attorney general Albert Ottinger announced that while it was not his purpose to "abolish" the Consolidated Exchange, he intended to "place upon the organization 'such restriction as would prevent its facilities from being used for improper and illegal purposes." A reorganization was mentioned. It was also mentioned that president Maloney would appear before Supreme Justice Ford on January 5, 1926, to respond to "Mr. Winter's offer to withhold the contempated injunction proceeding if [Maloney] would prove by his testimony that 85 percent of transactions on the Exchange floor represented actual deliveries."

=== 1926: Injunction ===
On February 4, 1926, Supreme Court Justice John Ford granted temporary injunction to "restrain the Consolidated Stock Exchange from continuing certain practices alleged by the Attorney General to be illegal." The exchange was given until the 11th to prove to the courts their actions were not illegal. Thomas B. Maloney, the exchange president at the time, said the exchange would remain operational. Among the banned actions were bucket shops, which had "more or less had the exchange under fire" for extensive bucketing operations.

On March 24, 1926, details of a reorganization of the exchange were made public. Several days later, Consolidated president Philip Evans and Deputy Attorney General Keyes Winter held hearings over the reorganization of the exchange, which entailed 19 provisions, some described as "drastic." The provisions included selling the exchange building, and also allowing members to leave the exchange and receive compensation. The remaining members were to sign a contract that they would not afterwards pursue the dissolution of the exchange. The exchange reopened on March 30, 1926, under "the revised constitution and stipulations drawn up by the State Attorney General," with the injunction dismissed. The agreement required each of 17 stipulations to be met by Consolidated for the injunction to remain down. The day after the re-opening, exchange officers asserted that business went on as normal. However, the Times quoted members stating that "very little" trading was done, as it was "virtually impossible for a floor trader to transact business under the drastic stipulations." On April 13, 1925, Consolidated denied reports that its officers were "seeking permission to modify certain restrictions under which the Exchange was permitted to resume business." At the time, some members described the business of the exchange having reached "virtually at a standstill." By April 1926, opposition had "again developed against the Exchange's administration," with a group of members demanding representation on the board, as "authorities are putting through resolutions without notifying the entire membership."

=== 1926–1927: End of operations ===
The exchange ceased operation in 1926. The exchange closed in spring of 1926, with officers remaining active. In October 1926, president Evans announced that the Exchange was not going to cease operation entirely, although he promised fair equity to members who wished to withdraw. By October 1926, the Exchange was located at 14-16 Pearl Street, where the tickers of the NYSE were in operation. At the time, the Exchange had been sued by the NYSE, with the NYSE seeking to compel the withdrawal of its tickers from the Consolidated. Writes the Times, "the consolidated insists that the use of the tickers is protected by an injunction obtained nearly forty years ago. The Stock Exchange contends that the status of affairs under which the use of the tickers was obtained has been changed." On December 2, 1926, John H. Frobisher was expelled from the Exchange, after the board heard him earlier in the week. Frobisher had earlier brought suit to the Supreme Court to have the Exchange dissolved and its assets equitably distributed. President Evans stated he had been expulsed for violating an unnamed by-law, while Frobisher claimed he had been expelled for aiding the government in a tax inquiry in February 1925, or specifically, the government "investigation of the Exchange's failure to pay its stamp tax." Frobisher stated he would keep his suit against Consolidated active.

Valentine Mott succeeded Philip Evans as president of the Consolidated in the middle of June 1927, and was "identified with the faction which sought unsuccessfully to resume trading." Evans had resigned "following the discovery that a thirty-five-year-old injunction which those in control of the Exchange believed protected them in the use of the New York Exchange tickers had been vacated many years ago." On June 29, 1927, Siegfried Frohlich and 23 other former members sued for an injunction restraining exchange president Valentine Mott from disposing or transferring any of the exchange's property. The case was heard on June 29, 1927.

== Competition with the NYSE ==
By its official formation in 1885, its memberships of 2403 included 400 members of the New York Stock Exchange (NYSE). The main reason that 400 members of the NYSE broke with it to form the Consolidated Stock Exchange was that the NYSE refused to service "odd lotter" buyers, which is to sell shares at lesser volumes than "round lots" of 100 shares. From its inception, Consolidated employed then cutting edge clearing house techniques which were efficient at preventing frauds and the reneging on bargains. The NYSE had been unsuccessful at its attempts to use clearing house techniques. Consolidated's success with centralized clearing forced the NYSE to in 1892 make a more serious attempt to itself implement centralized clearing, which succeeded.

In 1885, there was also a demand by the exchange's members for the creation of a department to deal in railroad stocks. Around this time, Consolidated was reportedly on cordial terms with the NYSE, and when Consolidated considered creating new departments, it negotiated openly with the NYSE, with Consolidated offering to confine its trading to "fractional lots." Over repeated disagreement, cooperation was abandoned, and Consolidated made the decision to "accept any trade that could be obtained." This led to "lively and heated debated in Wall Street," with the 400 Consolidated members who were also NYSE members withdrawing from Consolidated as a formal act of protest.

Throughout its approximately 40-year existence, Consolidated averaged 23% of NYSE volume. According to the economists Brown, Mulherin and Weidenmier, "NYSE bid-ask spreads fell by more than 10% when the Consolidated began to trade NYSE stocks and subsequently increased when the Consolidated ceased operations" and "empirical analysis suggests that this historical episode of stock market competition improved consumer welfare by an amount equivalent to US$9.6 billion today." The NYSE engaged in a bitter war against Consolidated throughout the latter's existence. The NYSE banned its members from dealing with members of Consolidated.

Writes The New York Times, "back in 1913, according to the stories, some of the boys connected with the old Consolidated Stock Exchange of New York York pulled a few political strings and got the Legislature to pass a law for their benefit. That law, which became Section 444 of the Penal Code of the State, made it a misdemeanor for any Exchange or its members of any Exchange to discriminate against any other Exchange. It was designed, of course, to prevent the New York Stock Exchange from interfering with its members' dealings on the Consolidated Exchange." The law was still on the books as of 1940, when it was removed without fanfare or press.

== Consolidated Exchange Buildings ==
On September 8, 1887, the corner stone of the building was put in place on the corner of Broadway and Exchange Place in Manhattan. This building was sold to the Knickerbocker Trust Company in 1906 and a new site at the southeast corner of Broad and Beaver Streetswas bought. The cornerstone was laid 31 January 1907 and the new building was occupied 26 August 1907.

On March 24, 1926, details of a reorganization of the exchange were made public, and the 19 provisions outlined by the Attorney General included selling the exchange building. On March 31, 1926, it was reported that following the sale of the Exchange Building, smaller quarters would be purchased or rented for Consolidated members to conduct business.

On April 12, 1926, officers including president Evans would not clarify if they intended to sell the building as the Exchange underwent reorganization. After appraisals, on April 15, 1926, the Exchange revealed it had turned down a $2,000,000 offer for the building, as $2,500,000 was expected. The mortgage on the building was also raised from $500,000 to $600,000, with the proceeds to be used by exchange administration.

After the decision to sell the building was made in March, it was sold for $720,000.

Abraham E. Lefcourt, who according to the Times by 1932 was "credited with building more skyscrapers than any other individual," replaced the Consolidated Stock Exchange building at Broad and Beaver Streets "with a forty-five-story structure in which he was reported to have invested between $5,000,000 and $6,000,000." After a thirty-five story addition, by 1932, the building was being used by the International Telephone and Telegraph Company. By October 1926, the Exchange was located at 14-16 Pearl Street, where the tickers of the NYSE were in operation.

== Key people ==
=== Notable members ===
By its official formation in 1885, its memberships of 2403 was considered the largest membership of any exchange in the United States, excluding the New York Produce Exchange. 400 of those members were also members of the New York Stock Exchange (NYSE), although those 400 members later withdrew over conflict on the scope of the Consolidated's business.

By 1907, total membership was approximately 1,300, with famous members such as Supreme Court Judges Gildersleeve and Leventritt, Henry H. Rogers, John D. Archbold, Anthony N. Brady, Stuart G. Nelson, Dumont Clarke, John E. Borne, Julian D. Fairchild, William Nelson Cromwell and William J. Curtis, Alfred H. Curtis, William A. Nash, O.L. Richard, Casimir Tag, W.A. Sherman, A.H. Calef, Senator W. A. Clark, R. L. Edwards, J. W. Copman, Charles W. Morse, Vernon H. Brown, and R. A. Cheseborough.

The president's report on May 31, 1917, noted there was a membership of about 480 in the Exchange, with that number virtually fixed by the board. By June 1925, there were 335 active members of the Consolidated.

=== Directors and executives ===
The New York Mining Stock Exchange opened for business in 1875, with John Stanton Jr. as president. When the Mining Stock Exchange and the National Petroleum Exchange were consolidated in 1883, Charles G. Wilson was elected president, and held the office until 1900. At the annual election on June 11, 1900, Mortimer H. Wagar defeated Charles G. Wilson for the presidency of the Consolidated Stock and Petroleum Exchange. According to The New York Times, "the contest was the most closely fought in the history of the Exchange, the total number of votes cast being 793. The largest vote ever polled in a previous election was 628." After Wilson's fifteen years as president, Wagar took over in 1900 with "a large majority of the members" supporting him, having polled 504 votes to 287.

Wagar was re-elected president in 1901 and 1902. When he retired after three years to join the Consolidated National Bank, he remained vice president of the exchange for two years upon request. Lewis V.F. Randolph was elected president in 1903, followed by 1904 and 1905.

The annual election for officers was held on June 13, 1904. Lewis V. F. Randolph was again elected president, and Wagar again vice president.

As of December 12, 1912, Valentine Mott was serving as chairman.

In the year of 1916 until 1917, the president was M.E. de Aguero. Valentine Mott served as chairman, while W. T. Marsh served as first vice president, and W.S. Silkworth the second vice president. For the year 1917 until 1918, J. Frank Howell served as president, W. S. Silkworth as first vice president, and O'Connor de Cordova as second vice president. Mott remained chairman. Mortimer H. Wagar, among other roles, was chairman of the Committee on Membership.

On May 10, 1921, the exchange held its annual officers election, electing W. S. Silkworth as president for 1921 and 1922, and Mortimer Wagar again vice president, with Valentine Mott as chairman.

In June 1923, it was reported that Silkworth would resign as president of the exchange. On June 7, he appeared in the Criminal Courts Building to be questioned regarding a recent bankruptcy of a brokerage that had been a member of the exchange.

For three months in 1926, former Consolidated president Silkworth served three months in the Eastview penitentiary in Westchester County after being convicted of mail fraud relating to his brokerage in 1922. On April 12, 1926, it was announced that E. H. H. Simmons, president of the exchange, had been nominated for a third term. In the officer elections held May 10, 1926, Philip Evans remained president as the results were recounted following ballot issues over the next few days. He ran against Alfred J. Lane of the "speedily formed" Members Protective Committee. Lane's supporters claimed Lane won with vote count, in contradiction to Evans' claim, that ballots were damaged in violation of the exchange constitution. For the May 10, 1926 Board of Governors elections, thirteen members were named to be voted on, all repeating their positions except Huntington Lyman nominated to replace William A. Greer.

=== List of presidents ===
Pre-consolidation presidents:

John Stanton	November 1, 1875	1876
George B. Satterlee	1877	1879
S. V. White	1880	1882
Charles O. Morris	1883	1884

Consolidated presidents:

Charles G. Wilson	1884	June 11, 1900
Mortimer H. Wagar	June 11, 1900	1903
Lewis Van Syckel Fitz Randolph	1903	1905
Ogden D. Budd	1906	
H. G. S. Noble		Five consecutive terms
M.E. de Aguero	1916	1917
J. Frank Howell	1917	1918
William S. Silkworth	April 1919	June 21, 1923 (resigned)
Laurence Tweedy	June 1923	1924
Seymour L. Cromwell	1921	Spring 1924
E. H. H. Simmons	Spring 1924	May 10, 1926
Thomas B. Maloney	1924	1925
Thomas B. Maloney	May 10, 1926	1926
Philip Evans	1926	June 1927
Valentine Mott	June 1927	

== See also ==
- List of former stock exchanges in the Americas
- List of stock exchange mergers in the Americas
- List of stock exchanges
- Economy of New York City
- Panic of 1907
