= Ludlow Street Jail =

Former prison in New York City

Coordinates: 40.7176°N 73.9893°W

- Interior and exterior of Ludlow Street Jail (c. 1862)

General information
- Location: Manhattan, New York City
- Opened: 1862
- Demolished: 1927

Scenes inside Ludlow Street Jail

The Ludlow Street Jail was New York City's Federal prison, located on Ludlow Street and Broome Street in Manhattan. Some prisoners, such as soldiers, were held there temporarily awaiting extradition to other jurisdictions, but most of the inmates were debtors imprisoned by their creditors. Seward Park Campus now sits on the site of the jail.

The jail was completed in June 1862 constructed of Philadelphia brick ornamented with New Jersey freestone trimmings. The facility contained 87 cells, each about 100 square feet. Long, barred windows provided light and air that was ahead of its time.

== Notable inmates ==
The two most famous inmates of the Ludlow Street Jail were Victoria Woodhull and Boss Tweed. Woodhull was the first female candidate for President of the United States and she spent a month at the jail, including election night, accused of publishing obscene materials. William "Boss" Tweed was a local politician and head of Tammany Hall, the name given to the Democratic Party political machine that played a major role in New York City politics from the 1790s to the 1860s. After being arrested for bilking the city out of millions of dollars, Tweed jumped bail and was later apprehended in Spain. He was subsequently delivered to authorities in New York City on November 23, 1876. He was imprisoned in the Ludlow Street Jail, occupying the warden's parlor for $75.00 a week. Two years after being imprisoned, he died at the age of 55.

In 1895, Carlos Roloff was imprisoned on charges of violating neutrality laws for his filibustering expeditions during the Cuban War of Independence. The charges were ultimately dropped, and he was released.

On May 17, 1923, William McGee and Edward M. Fuller were indefinitely committed to the Ludlow Street Jail for contempt of the Federal court, when they failed to return certain papers connected to the Fuller case investigation.

The jail was closed December 1927 and today the site is occupied by the Seward Park Campus which opened in mid-1928.
