= William Sylvester Silkworth =

American sport shooter

- Born: October 28, 1884; Brooklyn, New York, United States
- Died: April 1971; Hempstead, New York, United States
- Occupations: Broker, exchange executive, athlete
- Known for: President of the Consolidated Stock Exchange of New York
- Criminal charge: Mail fraud
- Criminal penalty: Temporary incarceration
- Family: George Silkworth (brother)

William Sylvester Silkworth
Sport
- Sport: Sports shooting
Medal record
Men's shooting
Representing the United States
Olympic Games
| Gold medal – first place | 1924 Paris | Team clay pigeons |

William Sylvester Silkworth (October 28, 1884 – April 1971), referred to in the U.S. press as "W. S. Silkworth", was an American financier known being president of the Consolidated Stock Exchange of New York and being forced to resign because of scandal. starting in 1919. He was also a sport shooter who competed in the 1924 Summer Olympics. In 1924, he won the gold medal as member of the American team in the team clay pigeons competition. Silkworth aggressively and successfully pursued new business for the exchange, and his career as president reached its peak in February 1922, when all trading records at the exchange were broken, ensuring that "Silkworth, not [NYSE president] McCormick, was the talk of Wall Street." Silkworth resigned on June 21, 1923, after an investigation into Consolidated insider corruption discovered irregularities in his personal finances. He later did time for mail fraud. By 1926, Silkworth was best known internationally as a member of the Olympic trap shooting team.

== Early life and family ==
He was born in New York City and died in Hempstead, New York. Based in New York City, William Silkworth's brother George was also involved in the financial industry, working as a broker in New York.

== Career ==
=== Consolidated committees ===
He was nominated for a two-year term on the board of governors of the Consolidated Stock Exchange of New York in April 1913. For 1916 and 1917, he was then one of 9 directors of the board of governors. For the Finance Committee of the exchange in 1916 and 1917, he was elected president and treasurer. For those years, he was also on the Committee of Arrangements, and was vice-chairman of the Committee on News and Statistics. For the year 1917 until 1918, J. Frank Howell served as Consolidated president, Silkworth as first vice president, and O'Connor de Cordova as second vice president.

=== President of Consolidated ===
In April 1919, William S. Silkworth was elected president of the exchange, winning with a substantial majority after a "bitter contest." According to historian Robert Sobel, Silkworth's election resulted in the "decline of the Little Board." Sobel writes that at that time of his election, "Silkworth operated several bucket shops, and had a hand in many shady deals of the period. He was also a fine salesman, a man of considerable charm, and an excellent publicity director for his market." Silkworth aggressively and successfully pursued new business for the exchange, with the brokers "delighted." He "easily" won re-election in 1920 and in 1921. On the May 10, 1921 annual officers election, Silkworth was named Consolidated president again for 1921 and 1922. His career as president reached its peak in February 1922, when all trading records at the exchange were broken, at a time when the NYSE had low volume, ensuring that "Silkworth, not [NYSE president McCormick], was the talk of Wall Street."

=== Federal inquiries and resignation ===
In February 1922, the Consolidated was hit "without warning" with several brokerage and firm failures within the exchange. The firms told Silkworth they needed additional capital to remain in business, and Silkworth raised a fund from the exchange members of $102,000. Several of the firms collapsed anyway, particularly R. H. MacMasters & Company, which failed in late February 1922. The failures shocked the industry. At the time there were calls in the New York State Assembly to ban bucketshops, making an investigation into Consolidated a topical political issue for Democratic gubernatorial candidate Alfred E. Smith. In July 1922, Silkworth conceded that some Consolidated brokers were corrupt, and that he was working to clear the exchange of them. Others accused him of misusing the rescue fund from February, with Silkworth denying the allegations in the press However, rumors persisted that Silkworth was considering resigning and leaving the country, which Silkworth again denied. In mid-July, a new series of unexpected failures occurred at Consolidated, including Edward M. Fuller & Company. George Silkworth, William Silkworth's brother, had been a partner at Fuller as well, leading to further accusations of insider corruption. William Silkworth continued to work on his reform program, and shortly afterwards, the assembly passed the Martin Act, which essentially banned bucketshops.

Albert Ottinger began working on the Fuller investigation in December 1922 out of the Anti-Fraud Bureau. Afterwards, a panic at Consolidated resulted in further houses failing, which Silkworth claimed was a result of his reform efforts. He was re-elected in April 1923 to president, promising to cooperate with authorities in ridding the exchange of corruption. On April 26, 1923, the Times reported that for two weeks, by process servers from the office of Carl Austrian and Francis L. Kohlman, counsel for Trustee George C. Sprague, had been seeking to serve subpoenas to Silkworth and his brother George. The trustee wanted to question the Silkworth in the search for assets, particularly $6,612,000 worth of securities which had allegedly been possessed by the Fuller firm at the time of its bankruptcy. At the time, the trial concerning the E. M. Fuller & Co. bankruptcy was awaiting the decision of the U.S. Supreme court on the right to use record-books of the firm. The books were sought by the prosecution to help in seeking a bucketing indictment.

The Ottinger investigation began in late May. In June 1923 it was reported that Silkworth would resign from Consolidated, and that the new exchange committee might demand his immediate resignation. Silkworth testified on June 6. On June 7, he appeared in the Criminal Courts Building to be questioned regarding the recent bankruptcy. Although Assistant Attorney General William F. McKenna failed to implicate Silkworth in the Fuller bankruptcy, he did uncover irregularities in Silkworth's personal finances. The irregularities showed he had made large deposits in March 1922, some related to the Fuller account. Silkworth resigned on June 21, 1923 and soon after went on a "long vacation."

=== Bucketing conviction ===
After he and seven others were indicted in late May 1924 for connection with the bankruptcy of Raynor, Nicholas & Truesdell, he pleaded not guilty on May 29, 1924 while held on $8,500 on bail. His counsel, Philip C. Samuels, asked that the trial be postponed until September as Silkworth expected to sail on May 30, 1924 "to take part in the trap shooting contests in the Olympic games." Prosecutor Peter F. McCoy instead asked for the trial to begin in August, for when it was scheduled. Wrote The New York Times about the proceedings, "many friends of Silkworth were present. After the proceedings they greeted him warmly and expressed confidence in him."

On November 29, 1924, Silkworth was convicted of the fraudulent use of mails in bucketing operations, as well as five others also found guilty of bucketing. The conviction was upheld on February 1, 1926 by the Circuit Court of Appeals. He lost his final "bucket" appeal by April 20, 1926, as well as several other brokers. He arrived at prison in June 1926, where his appointed work was farming. For three months in 1926, Silkworth served three months in the Eastview penitentiary in Westchester County after being convicted of mail fraud relating to his brokerage in 1922. and the brokerage house of Raynor, Nicholas and Truesdell. He was released on September 6, 1926 at noon at the Westchester County Penitentiary, paroled after serving three months of a years sentence for "using the mails to defraud." Silkworth stated he was considering becoming a realtor, and that his "persecution" resulted from his advocacy of the Strauss Bill.

=== False arrest case ===
He was held again in 1933, accused of theft by James F. Curtis of Roslyn, New York, a lawyer and former Assistant Secretary of the Treasury. According to the suit, Curtis authorized Silkworth to sell a motor boat "at the best possible price" in November 1932. With Curtis claiming Silkworth paid him around half of the boat's value, Silkworth was arrested for grand larceny on May 17, 1933. He was freed of the theft charge on June 2, 1933. On September 14, 1933, it was reported that Silkworth was suing Curtis for false arrest. With the verdict read by Justice Brennan of the Supreme Court, Curtis lost the suit and had to pay $500 of the $25,000 suit for false arrest and malicious prosecution.

== Traps career ==
On November 1, 1924, he won the highest prize at the scratch prize at the New York Athletic Club's Travers Island traps contest.

By 1926, Silkworth was best known internationally as a member of the Olympic trap shooting team.

On February 22, 1927 he won second place at the New York Athletic Club traps contest.

== Personal life ==
As of 1935, Silkworth lived in Great Neck, New York. He had also lived for a time in Roslyn Harbor, New York.

== See also ==
- Economy of New York City
- Charles G. Wilson
- Mortimer H. Wagar
