= The Man Who Talked Too Much =

- Theatrical release poster
- Directed by: Vincent Sherman
- Screenplay by: Walter DeLeon; Earl Baldwin; Tom Reed
- Based on: The Mouthpiece; 1929 play by Frank J. Collins
- Produced by: Bryan Foy
- Starring: George Brent; Virginia Bruce; Brenda Marshall; Richard Barthelmess; William Lundigan; George Tobias; John Litel
- Cinematography: Sidney Hickox
- Edited by: Thomas Pratt
- Music by: Heinz Roemheld
- Production company: Warner Bros. Pictures
- Distributed by: Warner Bros. Pictures
- Release dates: June 28, 1940 (New York City); July 16, 1940 (United States)
- Running time: 76 minutes
- Country: United States
- Language: English

The Man Who Talked Too Much is a 1940 American drama film starring George Brent and Virginia Bruce, with Brenda Marshall, Richard Barthelmess, and William Lundigan in support. Directed by Vincent Sherman, the film was written by Walter DeLeon and Earl Baldwin, and released by Warner Bros. Pictures.

The Man Who Talked Too Much is the second of three films adapted from the 1929 play The Mouthpiece by Frank J. Collins, in which a former prosecutor, disillusioned by sending an innocent man to the electric chair, takes the saying "Better that a hundred guilty men go free than one innocent man suffer the death penalty" one step further by becoming a defense attorney for gangsters and adroitly tightrope walking legal ethics. Collins based his protagonist on Manhattan defense attorney William Joseph Fallon, dubbed "The Great Mouthpiece" in the New York press, who had a short but spectacularly successful career before succumbing to the effects of his own dissoluteness at the age of 41.

== Plot ==
Steve Forbes prosecutes a case so convincingly, an innocent man ends up sentenced to die in the electric chair. He quits the district attorney's office and opens a private practice, resulting in racketeer J.B. Roscoe becoming a client.

The money he makes allows Steve to put younger brother Johnny through law school. After a while, Joan Reed, his secretary, and Johnny both become appalled by how unethical Steve has become in his profession. Johnny informs on Roscoe, after which the gangster frames him for a murder. Unable to save him in court, Steve works desperately to prove Johnny's innocence before his brother's execution.

== Cast ==
- George Brent as Stephen M. Forbes
- Virginia Bruce as Joan Reed
- Brenda Marshall as Celia Farrady
- Richard Barthelmess as J.B. Roscoe
- William Lundigan as John L. Forbes
- George Tobias as Slug 'Canvasback' McNutt
- John Litel as District Attorney Dickson
- Henry Armetta as Tony Spirella
- Alan Baxter as Joe Garland
- David Bruce as Gerald Wilson
- Clarence Kolb as E.A. Smith
- Louis Jean Heydt as Barton
- Marc Lawrence as Lefty Kyler
- Edwin Stanley as District Attorney Nelson
- Kay Sutton as Mrs. Knight
- Elliott Sullivan as Bill
- Dick Rich as Pete
- Phyllis Hamilton as Myrtle
- John Ridgely as Brooks
- William Forrest as Federal District Attorney Green
- Maris Wrixon as Roscoe's Secretary
- Margaret Hayes as Governor's Secretary

== Reception ==
Bosley Crowther of The New York Times said, "Garrulity is a social evil which very few people can abide, and the truth of the matter is that The Man Who Talked Too Much talks too much, too. For a straight gangster picture, which should be fast and concise, it is ponderously slow and windy and as transparent as a goldfish bowl. There are two identically suspenseful sequences, at the beginning and at the end, when innocent men linger painfully in the shadow of the electric chair while people rush around madly to save them. And that's about all the suspense there is."
