= New-York Petroleum Exchange and Stock Board =

Former U.S. stock exchange

- New-York Petroleum Exchange
- Type: Resource and stock exchange
- Location: New York City, United States
- Closed: February 28, 1885
- Key people: L. H. Smith (president)
- Currency: USD

The New-York Petroleum Exchange and Stock Board was a resource and stock exchange in New York City. Founded as the New-York Petroleum Exchange, in 1884 the exchange reported oil clearances amounting to 2,373,582,000 barrels, averaging 7,782,000 barrels per day. That year the exchange also began trading in stocks, bonds, and other securities. The institution merged with the competing exchange New-York Mining and National Petroleum Exchange on February 28, 1885, forming the Consolidated Stock and Petroleum Exchange.

== History ==
By December 1883, the New York Times wrote that "much interest" was being shown in a proposed consolidation between the competing New-York Petroleum Exchange and the New-York Mining Stock and National Petroleum Exchange. The matter was voted on by both exchange members on December 22, 1883. At the vote, members of the New-York Mining Stock and National Petroleum Exchange largely favored consolidation. However, the New-York Petroleum Exchange saw 269 in favor and 250 against, out of a total membership of around 688. Afterwards, a joint committee of three members from each Exchange was proposed, for the drafting of a new constitution and by-laws prior to any consolidation. On March 11, 1884, it was reported that the governing board of the New-York Mining Stock and National Petroleum Exchange had voted against consolidation 29 to 2. One of the reasons given was that the National Exchange treasury contained $204,000, while the New-York Petroleum Exchange only had $74,570. However, a resolution was passed that members of the New-York Petroleum Exchange could join the National Exchange.

The Times reported on August 8, 1884 that "An animated meeting of the New-York Petroleum Exchange was held yesterday afternoon for the purpose of considering the subject of amending the constitution of that Exchange so as to permit the members to trade in stocks, bonds, and other securities." On September 24, 1884, the Governing Committee of the New York Stock Exchange (NYSE) sent notices to Stock Exchange members who were also New-York Petroleum Exchange and Stock Board members, stating that according to Stock Exchange rules, membership could not be retained in both. At a meeting held on December 10, 1884, the New-York Petroleum Exchange and Stock Board amended its constitution. The amendment limited membership to 2,000, with members above an initial 1,700 required to pay a $2,000 initiation fee. In late December 1884, the president of the New-York Petroleum Exchange and Stock Board L. H. Smith issued key facts. Among them, membership was listed at 1,004 at the time, with plans to increase the building fund to potentially build a building to accommodate the exchange. For 1884, the exchange reported oil clearances amounting to 2,373,582,000 barrels, averaging 7,782,000 barrels per day.

On February 3, 1885, the Governing Committee of the exchange voted not to radically remodel their building at Broad-street. The competing exchange New-York Mining and National Petroleum Exchange merged with the New-York Petroleum Exchange and Stock Board on February 28, 1885. The new institution was named the Consolidated Stock and Petroleum Exchange.

== See also ==
- Consolidated Stock Exchange of New York
- Economy of New York City
- List of former stock exchanges in the Americas
- List of stock exchange mergers in the Americas
- List of stock exchanges
