= Bonus share =

Shares distributed by a company to its current shareholders

Bonus shares are shares distributed by a company to its current shareholders as fully paid shares free of charge.

- to capitalise a part of the company's retained earnings
- for conversion of its share premium account, or
- distribution of treasury shares.

An issue of bonus shares is referred to as a bonus share issue.

A bonus issue is usually based upon the number of shares that shareholders already own. (For example, the bonus issue may be "n shares for each x shares held"; but with fractions of a share not permitted.) While the issue of bonus shares increases the total number of shares issued and owned, it does not change the value of the company. Although the total number of issued shares increases, the ratio of number of shares held by each shareholder remains constant. In this sense, a bonus issue is similar to a stock split.

== Process ==
Whenever a company announces a bonus issue, it also announces a book closure date which is a date on which the company will ideally temporarily close fresh transfers of stock.

Depending upon the constitutional documents of the company, only certain classes of shares may be entitled to bonus issues, or may be entitled to bonus issues in preference to other classes. Bonus shares are distributed in a fixed ratio to the shareholders.

Sometimes a company will change the number of shares in issue by capitalizing its reserve. In other words, it can convert the right of the shareholders because each individual will hold the same proportion of the outstanding shares as before.

Because a bonus issue does not represent an economic event – no wealth changes hands. The current shareholders simply receive new shares, for free, and in proportion to their previous share in the company. Therefore, a bonus share issue is very similar to a stock split. The only practical difference is that a bonus issue creates a change in the structure of the company's shareholders' equity (in accounting). Another difference between a bonus issue and a stock split is that while a stock split usually also splits the company's authorized share capital, the distribution of bonus shares only changes its issued share capital (or even only its outstanding shares).

== Tax implications ==
A bonus share issue is most commonly not taxed as a dividend, even if it is charged to retained earnings.

However, there may be capital gains or profit on sale implications on the subsequent sale of these shares. In general, the cost base of the bonus shares is usually zero, but if the bonus issue is taxable as a dividend, then the cost base is generally the taxed dividend amount, plus any calls on partly paid bonus shares. The acquisition date is the date of issue.
