= New-York Mining Stock and National Petroleum Exchange =

- Type: Stock exchange, resource exchange
- Location: New York City, United States
- Founded: 1883
- Closed: 1885

The National Petroleum Exchange was a resource exchange in New York City founded in 1882. In 1883 the National Petroleum Exchange and the New York Mining Stock Exchange were consolidated, becoming the New-York Mining Stock and National Petroleum Exchange. After several other exchange mergers with competitors, the exchange became the Consolidated Stock and Petroleum Exchange of New York, which in 1885 became the Consolidated Stock Exchange of New York.

== History ==
On December 18, 1882, the National Petroleum Exchange was opened. Sales that day equated to 150,000 barrels. On March 24, 1883, the New-York Mining and National Petroleum Exchange had a membership of 479. In 1883 the National Petroleum Exchange and the New York Mining Stock Exchange were consolidated, at which point Charles G. Wilson was elected president and held the office until 1900. The new exchange was named the New-York Mining Stock and National Petroleum Exchange.

By December 1883, the New York Times wrote that "much interest" was being shown in a proposed consolidation between the competing New-York Petroleum Exchange and the New-York Mining Stock and National Petroleum Exchange. The matter was voted on by both exchange members on December 22, 1883. At the vote, members of the New-York Mining Stock and National Petroleum Exchange largely favored consolidation. However, the New-York Petroleum Exchange saw 269 in favor and 250 against, out of a total membership of around 688. Afterwards, a joint committee of three members from each Exchange was proposed, for the drafting of a new constitution and by-laws prior to any consolidation. On March 11, 1884, it was reported that the governing board of the New-York Mining Stock and National Petroleum Exchange had voted against consolidation 29 to 2. One of the reasons given was that the National Exchange treasury contained $204,000, while the New-York Petroleum Exchange only had $74,570. However, a resolution was passed that members of the New-York Petroleum Exchange could join the National Exchange.

The New-York Mining and National Petroleum Exchange merged with the competing New-York Petroleum Exchange and Stock Board on February 28, 1885. After several other exchange merges with competitors such as the Miscellaneous Security Board, the exchange became known as the Consolidated Stock and Petroleum Exchange of New York.

== See also ==
- List of former stock exchanges in the Americas
- List of stock exchange mergers in the Americas
- List of stock exchanges
- Economy of New York City
