= Charles G. Wilson =

American financier and businessman (1843–1906)

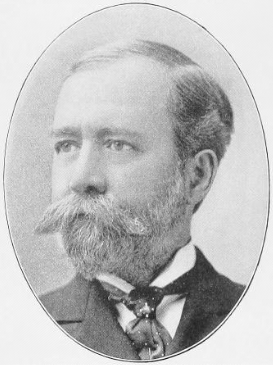
- Born: Charles George Wilson; June 9, 1843; Baltimore, Maryland, US
- Died: May 18, 1906 (aged 62); Orange County, New York, US
- Occupations: Businessperson, public official
- Employer: Consolidated Stock Exchange
- Term: President of the New York City Board of Health
- Spouse: Augusta J. Wilson (died 1904)

Charles George Wilson (1843–1906) was an American financier and businessman. Wilson was president of the Consolidated Stock and Petroleum Exchange of New York from 1883 until 1900. As of December 1894, he was serving as President of the New York City Board of Health as well.

== Career ==
When the New York Mining Stock Exchange and the National Petroleum Exchange were consolidated in 1883 into the Consolidated Stock and Petroleum Exchange of New York, Charles G. Wilson was elected president and held the office until 1900.

In 1890, he was appointed president of the New York City Board of Health, and as president, by September 1892 he was handling a cholera outbreak in New York City. As of December 1894, he was serving as both president of the Board of Health as well as President of the Consolidated Exchange. After re-appointment by the mayor, he kept his position at the health board until 1898.

At the annual Consolidated Stock Exchange election on June 11, 1900, Mortimer H. Wagar defeated Wilson for the presidency of the Consolidated Stock and Petroleum Exchange. According to The New York Times, "the contest was the most closely fought in the history of the Exchange, the total number of votes cast being 793. The largest vote ever polled in a previous election was 628." After Wilson's fifteen years as president, Wagar took over in 1900 with "a large majority of the members" supporting him, having polled 504 votes to 287. On May 29, 1902, he sent a letter to the editor of the Times, clarifying that he was not in fact in opposition to the then present administration of the Exchange, as reported prior.

== Personal life ==
Charles George Wilson was born in Baltimore on June 9, 1843.

As of 1894, he had apartments in Chelsea at 23rd Street. He was the stepfather of Mrs. A. E. Kofoed, who disappeared from her home in August 1899. Wilson asserted that she might have been kidnapped, as compared to suicide. His wife, Augusta J. Wilson, died on November 21, 1904. The funeral was held at her home on 94th Street in New York.

Wilson died at his summer home near Goshen, New York on May 18, 1906.

== See also ==
- William S. Silkworth
