= Fuller case =

"bucket shop"

E. M. Fuller and Co. bankruptcy trial
- Court: New York Court

Case history
- Appealed from: Edward M. Fuller, William F. Mcgee

E. M. Fuller and Co. bankruptcy trial, or the Fuller case, was a criminal trial referring to the prosecution of Edward M. Fuller and William F. McGee for using their brokerage firm E. M. Fuller and Co. as a "bucket shop" in the early 1920s. United States Attorney William Hayward was assisted in the case by assistant US Attorney John E. Joyce. The case started when the firm went bankrupt in 1922, and creditors petitioned to recover assets from E. M. Fuller & Co., as the assets "mysteriously disappeared" when the firm went bankrupt. Ultimately Fuller and McGee pled guilty, and were convicted of operating a bucketshop in connection with E.M. Fuller Co., for defrauding its customers around $4,000,000 by bucketing the orders of customers. The case also resulted in trials for high-profile New Yorkers such as Consolidated Exchange president William S. Silkworth, attorney William J. Fallon, sports broker Charles A. Stoneham, and gambler Arnold Rothstein.

== History ==
=== 1922: Bankruptcy and petition ===
The New York City brokerage firm Edward M. Fuller & Company was founded in 1914, and by 1922 it was the largest brokerage house on the Consolidated Exchange, with only two members of the firm: Edward M. Fuller and W. F. McGee. There were two offices in New York, one uptown and one at 50 Broad Street. Em. M. Fuller & Co. failed three times on the Consolidated Exchange, and was tried three times in court but never convicted due to mistrial. In February 1922 all trading records at the Consolidated Stock Exchange were broken after months of good business. Later that month, however, several brokerages and firms within the exchange failed "without warning," shocking the industry. Edward M. Fuller & Company failed on June 27, 1922 for $6,000,000. As the brother of the president of the Consolidated Exchange had been a partner at Fuller, accusations of insider corruption abounded. Fuller of Great Neck, New York did not comment on the failure, while his partner William F. McGee of 73rd Street was also unavailable that day. According to the Times, the next day employees filtered in to find no executives explaining the failure, and everything except furniture removed from the office spaces. The Times also repeated the rumor that the firm's private files had been broken into and circulated directly after the failure, possibly by a clerk. In the bankruptcy petition filed in the U.S. District Court in New York, assets were estimated at $250,000 and liabilities at $500,000, with customer claims totaling $1,250,000. Hays, St. John & Moore of 43 Exchange Place were hired as attorneys for the firm. The Fuller case started when creditors petitioned to recover assets from E. M. Fuller & Co., as the assets "mysteriously disappeared" when the firm went bankrupt. On August 2, 1922, District Attorney Banton was denied access to the books of E. M. Fuller Co. to use in pursuing a case against the firm.

=== 1922–1923: Federal inquiries ===
Albert Ottinger began working on an investigation into the Fuller bankruptcy in December 1922 out of the Anti-Fraud Bureau in New York. In the spring of 1923, Vanity Fair writes that William Randolph Hearst assigned Nat Ferber, a reporter for Hearst's New York American, to find "who was protecting the bucket-shops." With permission from the New York County district attorney, Ferber was allowed to examine records under federal guard at the vacated office of Fuller and McGee. Coming upon canceled checks, he noticed some were made out to high-profile New York gambler Arnold Rothstein. Between November 10, 1920, and November 9, 1921, the Fuller firm wrote $187,000 worth of checks to Rothstein. Furthermore, Ferber discovered that lawyer Bill Fallon had hung the jury in the third trial against Fuller, by bribing a juror to hold out for acquittal. Fallon worked for Rothstein as well as Fuller and McGee.

Around April 12, 1923, the office of Carl Austrian and Francis L. Kohlman, counsel for Trustee George C. Sprague, begin attempting to serve subpoenas to the Silkworth brothers. The trustee wanted to question the Silkworths in the search for assets, particularly $6,612,000 worth of securities which had allegedly been possessed by the Fuller firm at the time of its bankruptcy. On April 26, 1923, The New York Times reported that for two weeks, process servers had failed to find and serve the Silkworths with the subpoenas. At the time, the trial concerning the E. M. Fuller & Co. bankruptcy was awaiting the decision of the U.S. Supreme Court on the right to use record-books of the firm. The books were sought by the prosecution to help in seeking a bucketing indictment.

=== May 1923: Investigation and trial ===
The Ottinger investigation began in late May. On May 17, 1923, McGee and Fuller were indefinitely committed to the Ludlow Street Jail for contempt of the Federal court, when they failed to return certain papers connected to the investigation. On May 21, 1923, W. S. Silkworth told Federal Receiver Harold P. Coffin at a hearing on the bankruptcy case, that confidential reports about the firm received by the exchange had recently disappeared. William Silkworth testified on June 6 in the Criminal Courts Building to be questioned regarding the recent bankruptcy. Although Assistant Attorney General William F. McKenna failed to implicate Silkworth in the Fuller bankruptcy, he did uncover irregularities in Silkworth's personal finances. The irregularities showed he had made large deposits in March 1922, some related to the Fuller account. On June 6, 1923, Fuller and McGee were sentenced to fifteen months to four years, to begin serving in June 1927. That day, Judge Henry W. Goddard signed an unusual order for Fuller to be brought from the Ludlow Street Jail each day under armed guard to the General Sessions of the Fuller trial, concerning the indictment charging him with bucketing a stock order. They were on trial for twelve grand larceny and bucketing indictments.

=== June 1923: Fuller's confessions ===
On June 7, the Times wrote that "each new exposure of bucketing among brokerage firms brings its new crop of rumors, and it is predicted that the really sensational developments are still pending. William M. Chadbourne continued to act as counsel for the 4,000 Fuller creditors in the hearings. In mid-June 1923, Edward M. Fuller plead guilty to bucketing customers orders. He appeared on June 18, 1923 before Coffin to "reveal the methods of his firm" and the names of his superiors, and the superiors of his partner W. Frank McGee. However, on June 18, 1923, Fuller's confession failed to materialize in implicating persons "higher up" in the bucket shop ring, with Hayward failing to get any useful information in examination. Fuller refused to give names without immunity.

William Silkworth resigned as Consolidated president on June 21, 1923, and soon after went on a "long vacation." On June 24, 1924, Arnold Rothstein testified that he borrowed $187,000 from Fuller in 1921, and then testified that he had returned the amount within a few days. Other questions, Rothstein refused to answer or stated "I don't remember." Thomas Foley and Charles Stoneham were also at the proceedings under subpoena. After examining the papers of the firm, on June 27, 1923, William M. Chadbourne, counsel for the 4,000 creditors of E.M. Fuller Co., informed United States District Attorney William Hayward and District Attorney Joab H. Banton that the firm had committed "crimes other than bucketing."

=== July 1923: Expanded indictments ===
On July 2, 1923, the Federal Grand Jury released four more indictments in the Fuller case, with the charges and names kept secret. It was revealed the indictments were linked with the seizure of documents from the baggage of William Frank McGee's ex-wife Nellie Shechan McGee several days earlier. On July 26, 1923, the bankruptcy hearing in the Fuller case was being held at 217 Broadway at the office of bankruptcy referee Harold P. Coffin. That day there was a conflict between Coffin and Foley's counsel Edward E. McCall, when a reference to William R. Hearst was ordered stricken from the record. McCall mentioned in proceedings that Hearst had offered money to McGee's ex-wife in Europe, asking her to return to New York. When she had asked Foley what it was about, he had theorized to her that Hearst had wanted to obtain press materials for his newspapers from her. McCall objected strongly to Coffin's choice to strike the statement from the record, with Coffin in turn threatening to force McCall to leave the proceedings.

After Fuller and McGee gave "sensational" full disclosures to the police on bucketshop operations in early August 1923, Federal authorities put both men in seclusion, to protect against "attack by gunman who may have been employed by men fearing exposure." The August Federal Grand Jury's investigation into Fuller and Mcgee's confessions was completed on August 27, 1923, with indictments drawn up the next day in the Federal Building.

=== 1924: Exposure of Rothstein, Fallon, Stoneham ===
In February 1924, the press reported that a key witness in the trial was gone missing, with friends fearing foul play.

On July 17, 1924, it was indicated that Fuller and McGee had "at last made a complete confession of their criminal activities," involving other individuals they had previously protected. They were released on bail the day after at Hayward's request. The press reported that they had exposed William J. Fallon, Charles A. Stoneham, and Arnold Rothstein. It was explained that Hayward had pushed for the bail, as he needed both Fuller and McGee as government witnesses in the forthcoming trials of Fallon, Stoneham, and Rothstein on indictments stemming from the Fuller bankruptcy investigation. At the time, Fuller and McGee were being held in contempt of court for failing to return documents their attorney, Fallon, had been given to prepare their defense. They had been Federal prisoners on Governors Island for almost a year.

=== 1927–1932: Prison terms and ongoing Rothstein trial ===
Edward M. Fuller and William F. McGee were sent to jail on June 6, 1927, by General Session Judge Charles C. Nott, after their appeal for a further stay of sentence was refused. They both received parole from Sing Sing Prison the day before June 1, 1928. They each earned $9.30 working at Sing Sing Prison. On June 19, 1928, it was reported that the Division of Licenses had refused to give McGee and Fuller licenses as realty brokers, which had been their "reported intention." The division felt the two men had lost their citizenship through their felony conviction, and that a provision of law deemed them unfit.

In June 1928, George C. Sprague as receiver in bankruptcy for Edward M. Fuller and William F. McGee was suing Arnold Rothstein to recover $366,768 allegedly paid in gambling debts by McGee and Fuller to Rothstein. Rothstein fought the suit, arguing the checks were cashed as a favor to the brokers. After Rothstein died on November 6, 1928, Rothstein's estate continued to fight the Fuller case in October 1929, arguing his seven "little black books" contained no secrets, even as his counsel fought to stop the inspection of his records by the prosecution.

On October 7, 1932, Fuller was in critical condition in a Miami hospital after a gunshot wound to the head. The press reported the bullet wound appeared self-inflicted.
