= William H. Remick =

Former president of the New York Stock Exchange

President of the New York Stock Exchange
- In office May 1919 – May 1921
- Preceded by: Henry George Stebbins Noble
- Succeeded by: Seymour L. Cromwell

Personal details
- Born: William Hammond Remick; October 14, 1866 East Boston, Massachusetts, U.S.
- Died: March 9, 1922 (aged 55) New York City, New York, U.S.
- Spouse: Elizabeth Wilson Moore (m. 1903)
- Children: 2

William Hammond Remick (October 14, 1866 – March 9, 1922) was an American banker who served as president of the New York Stock Exchange.

== Early life ==
Remick was born on East Boston, Massachusetts on October 14, 1866. He was a son of Joseph Remick and Mary Ann Pickering (née Hammond) Remick. Among his siblings was Joseph Remick of Pillsbury, Remick & Co. of Boston and Frank W. Remick, a member of Kidder, Peabody & Co. who served as president of the Boston Stock Exchange while William was president of the New York Stock Exchange.

His maternal grandparents were Mary (née Kennard) Hammond and Captain William Hammond, who resided at Bolt Hill and was representative to the legislature, county commissioner and register of probate.

After attending public schools in East Boston, he began working in the woolen business before going into banking.

== Career ==
In 1893, he became associated with R.L. Day & Co. in Boston. Two years later, he opened their New York office before becoming a partner in 1903. In 1913, he established his own investment banking firm, Remick, Hodges & Co. located at 14 Wall Street. In 1917, he was made chairman of the second Liberty Loan drive Committee of stock exchange houses and continued as chairman during succeeding loan drives.

In 1907, he purchased his seat on the New York Stock Exchange and in 1909, he was chosen to serve on the Exchange's Board of Governors, a position he retained until his death in 1922. While on the Board, he served on various committees, including the Committees on Laws, Finance, Stock Lists, Ways and Means, and as Chairman of the Committees on Insolvencies and on Admissions. From May 1919 to May 1921, he served as president of the New York Stock Exchange. The period of Remick's presidency of the Exchange was "exceptionally trying due to the banking situation in the Fall of 1919 and the strain on the credit structure of the country." In April 1921, Remick stated to a group of visitors to the Exchange that "the gradual development of the country through the railroads and industrial enterprises was made possible by the liquid wealth of the Eastern section of the country." He added that "your Governing Committee is doing the utmost to safeguard the public in every way possible and that the code of ethics and the sense of fair dealing of the members of the Exchange is as high--yes, higher--than is found in any business of the country." He was succeeded by his vice-president, Seymour L. Cromwell.

A Republican, Remick also served as a director of the Stock Clearing House Corporation, the Submarine Boat Corporation, the Electric Boat Company, the New York Railways Company, and a trustee of the Dry Dock Savings Institution. At the time of his death, he was a senior member of his investment bank, Remick, Hodges & Co.

== Personal life ==
On October 7, 1903, Remick was married to Elizabeth Wilson Moore of Wilmington, Delaware at "The Folly" at Fort Washington. Elizabeth, the daughter of John and Mary (née Wilson) Moore, was a niece of Mrs. J. Hood Wright, studied at Michigan State University from 1891 to 1893. Together, they lived at 907 Fifth Avenue, located at Fifth Avenue and 72nd Street, which was built in 1916 and was the first apartment building to replace a private mansion on Fifth Avenue above 59th Street. William and Elizabeth were the parents of two daughters:

- Mary Moore Remick (born June 11, 1905)
- Elizabeth Hammond Remick (born February 6, 1909), who predeceased William.

He was a member of the Union League Club, the Metropolitan Club, the Piping Rock Club and the New York Yacht Club. His wife was a life member of the Sorosis Club, the first professional women's club in the United States.

Remick died of heart disease at his residence in New York City, on March 9, 1922.

The Design 1023 cargo ship, SS Suremico (launched in 1920) was named in his honor (her name being a portmanteau of her manufacturer and her namesake, SUbmarine Boat REMIck COrporation).

== Legacy ==
- Crabmeat Remick, which was created around 1920 at the Plaza Hotel in New York City was named in honor of William Remick, then current president of the stock exchange.

Business positions
Preceded by Henry George Stebbins Noble	President of the New York Stock Exchange; 1919 – 1921	Succeeded by Seymour L. Cromwell
