= Capital surplus =

Equity reserve (share premium) above par value

Capital surplus, also called share premium, is an account which may appear on a corporation's balance sheet, as a component of shareholders' equity, which represents the amount the corporation raises on the issue of shares in excess of their par value (nominal value) of the shares (common stock).

This is called Additional paid in capital in US GAAP terminology but, additional paid in capital is not limited to share premium. It is a very broad concept and includes tax related and conversion related adjustments.

Taken together, common stock (and sometimes preferred stock) issued and paid (plus capital surplus) represent the total amount actually paid by investors for shares when issued (assuming no subsequent adjustments or changes).

Shares for which there is no par value will generally not have any form of capital surplus on the balance sheet; all funds from issuing shares will be credited to common stock issued.

Some other scenarios for triggering a capital surplus include when the Government donates a piece of land to the company.

The capital surplus/share premium account (SPA) is generally not distributable, but may be used to:

- write off the expenses/commission relating to the issue of those shares, or
- make a bonus share issue of fully paid-up shares.

Within the framework of capital increase by share premium a larger proportion of capital increase is placed into a capital reserve while the subscribed capital is increased by a minimum amount. This is because the initial losses are covered by the capital reserve. If capital increase was carried out fully or to a significant degree through the increase of subscribed capital, equity could easily fall to below the subscribed capital due to the losses.

It may also be used to account for any gains the firm may derive from selling treasury stock, although this is less commonly seen.

Capital surplus is also a term used by economists to denote capital inflows in excess of capital outflows on a country's balance of payments.

== Background ==
Many firms authorize shares with some nominal par value, often the smallest unit of currency commonly in use (such as one penny or $0.01), in many jurisdictions due to legal requirements. The firm may then sell these shares for a much higher price (as the par value is a largely archaic and fictional concept).

Any premium received over the par value is credited to capital surplus.

=== Share premium reserve account ===
According to Companies Act 2006 s.610 in the United Kingdom the share premium account may be used only for certain specific purposes. However, UK company law in this connection was significantly relaxed in 2008 by permitting the share premium account to be converted into share capital and then the share capital to be reduced (effectively allowing the elimination of the share premium account by a two-stage process).

Under companies ordinance 1984 (Nepal) s.84:

(1) If a company issues shares at a premium, whether for cash or otherwise, a sum equal to the aggregate amount or value of the premiums on those shares shall be transferred to an account called "the share premium account".

(2) The share premium account may be applied by the company in paying up unissued shares to be allotted to members as fully paid bonus shares, or in writing off- (a) the company's preliminary expenses; or (b) the expenses of, or the commission paid or discount allowed on, any issue of shares or debentures of the company, or (c) in providing for the premium payable on redemption of debentures of the company.

(3) Subject to this, the provisions of this Act relating to the reduction of a company's share capital apply as if the share premium account were part of its paid up share capital.

A company's SPA is a part of creditors' buffer.

Assets:

Cash: $450

Liabilities:

Nil

Shareholders' equity:

Common stock: $100
Preference stock: $25
Share premium: $325

SPA = Number of new shares issued x (issue price - par value)

== See also ==
- Base erosion and profit shifting
- Bond (finance)
- Common stock
- Preferred stock
- Treasury stock
- Paid in capital
- Reserve (accounting)
- Shareholders' equity
