= Paid-in capital =

Paid-in capital (also paid-up capital and contributed capital) is capital that is contributed to a corporation by investors by purchase of stock from the corporation, the primary market, not by purchase of stock in the open market from other stockholders (the secondary market). It includes share capital (capital stock) as well as additional paid-in capital.

The paid-in capital account does not reflect the amount of capital contributed by any specific investor. Instead, it shows the aggregate amount of capital contributed by all investors.

However, the term has different definitions in different contexts. For example, it could refer to the money that a company gets from potential investors, in addition to the stated (nominal or par) value of the stock, which coincides with the definition of additional paid-in capital, or paid-in capital in excess of par. One should be aware of the use of the term and the abbreviation, which can confuse.

== See also ==
- Balance sheet
- Capital surplus
- Preferred stock
- Reserve (accounting)
- Treasury stock
