= Eugene F. McGee =

American football player, coach, and lawyer (1882–1952)

Biographical details
- Born: June 26, 1882; New Lebanon, New York, U.S.
- Died: August 6, 1952 (aged 70); Shreveport, Louisiana, U.S.

Playing career
- 1904–1907: Fordham

Coaching career (HC unless noted)
- 1905: Fordham

Head coaching record
- Overall: 5–2

Eugene Francis McGee (June 26, 1882 – August 6, 1952) was an American lawyer and college football player and coach. He served as the head football coach at Fordham University in 1905, compiling a record of 5–2. McGee was the valedictorian of Fordham University School of Law's first graduating class, in 1908. With his law partner, William J. Fallon, McGee defended more than 125 homicide cases. The two also defended Nicky Arnstein in a 1924 case of conspiracy to carry stolen securities into Washington, D.C. McGee moved to Shreveport, Louisiana around 1942, where he owned the Tri-State Boat Club and Cross Lake Inn. He died in Shreveport, on August 6, 1952.

== Head coaching record ==
Year	Team	Overall	Conference	Standing	Bowl/playoffs
Fordham (Independent) (1905)
1905	Fordham	5–2			
Fordham:		5–2			
Total:		5–2			
