= Edward H. H. Simmons =

E. Henry H. Simmons
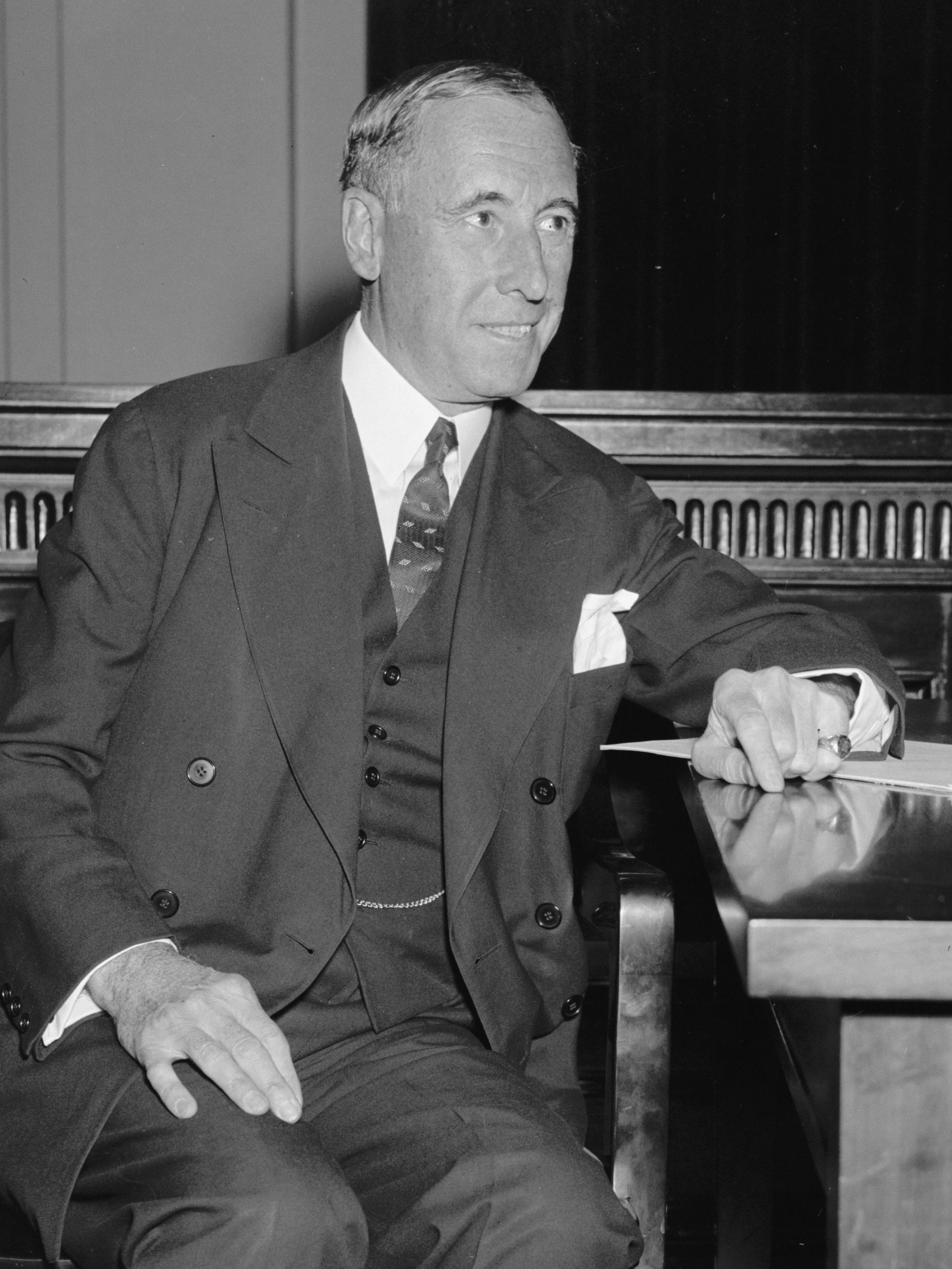
- Simmons c. 1938

President of the New York Stock Exchange
- In office 1924–1930
- Preceded by: Seymour L. Cromwell
- Succeeded by: Richard Whitney

Personal details
- Born: Edward Henry Harriman Simmons; August 21, 1876 Jersey City, New Jersey, U.S.
- Died: May 21, 1955 (aged 78) New York City, U.S.
- Spouse(s): Caroline G. Comstock (m. 1901; died 1920) Beatrice Vanderpoel Bogert (m. 1929; died 1942)
- Relations: E. H. Harriman (uncle); W. Averell Harriman (cousin); Joseph Harriman (cousin)
- Education: Columbia University

Edward Henry Harriman Simmons (August 21, 1876 – May 21, 1955) was an American banker and author who served as president of the New York Stock Exchange.

== Early life ==
Simmons was born in Jersey City, New Jersey on August 21, 1876. He was a son of Charles Dewar Simmons (1847–1926) and Cornelia "Lilly" Neilson (née Harriman) Simmons. Among his siblings was Harriman Neilson Simmons, Charles Dewar Simmons Jr., Mary Elizabeth (née Simmons) Goff, and Cornelia Neilson (née Simmons) King.

His paternal grandparents were Thomas Corbett Simmons and Mary Elizabeth Simmons and his maternal grandparents were Orlando Harriman and Cornelia (née Neilson) Harriman. His maternal uncle, and namesake, was railroad executive Edward Henry Harriman, and his maternal aunt, Annie Ingland Harriman, was married to James Fleming Van Rensselaer. Among his cousins were diplomat and future New York Governor W. Averell Harriman and bankers Oliver Harriman Jr., and E. Roland Harriman.

After attending the Stevens School in Hoboken followed by the Drisler School, Simmons trained as a doctor at Columbia University, graduating in 1898.

== Career ==
Shortly after Columbia, he decided to give up medicine for a career in finance. Not long thereafter, he set up his own brokerage business and became a director of the Harriman National Bank, of which another cousin, Joseph Wright Harriman, was president.

In 1900, Simmons became a member of the New York Stock Exchange and, beginning in 1909, a member of the governing committee. From 1921 through 1924, he served as vice-president of the Exchange, followed by a six-year term as president beginning in 1924 (when he was a member of the firm of Rutter & Gross at 52 Broadway). Throughout his tenure, he was a vocal opponent of stock frauds, utilizing the facilities of the Exchange to aid members "in connection with the nation-wide campaign to eliminate bucket shops, unscrupulous stock promoters and other schemes which result in the American investing public being swindled out of millions." In 1928, he spearheaded efforts to form "an international campaign against security swindlers and fraudulent promoters, with the leading fraud-fighting agencies of the United States and in cooperation with those of the nations of Europe." Reportedly:

"The spiteful said that Simmons would really have preferred canonization, election to the papacy, or the role of lord mayor of London; that he had accepted only as a poor alternative the most important electoral office in the financial world. His few friends said that he was born for his exalted and unsalaried post. For them he epitomized the puritanism of those twenty-four brokers who in May 1792 gathered under a buttonwood tree and drew up a written agreement to deal only with each other on a common commission basis, so forming the Exchange Simmons now presided over."

A prominent speaker and writer, in 1925, he delivered a speech before the annual convention of Investment Bankers of America in St. Petersburg, Florida entitled The Stock Exchange and American Banking. Also in 1925, he wrote Modern Capitalism: And Other Addresses, followed by New York, Metropolis and Capital Market in 1927, Safeguarding the Nation's Capital in 1928, and Speculation in Securities in 1929. In January 1930, he delivered an address entitled: The Principal Causes of the Stock Market Crisis of 1929 at the thirty first annual dinner of the Transportation Club at the Pennsylvania Railroad in Philadelphia.

Upon his retirement from the presidency in 1930 after six years in office, he was succeeded by Richard Whitney. In May 1935, Simmons became vice-president of the Exchange at the suggestion of Charles R. Gay, Whitney's successor as president of the Exchange. Whitney, however, was later convicted of embezzlement and imprisoned and Simmons had to testify multiple times in 1938 before the U.S. Securities and Exchange Commission, regarding Whitney and the Richard Whitney & Co. insolvency.

== Personal life ==
Simmons was twice married. He married his first wife Caroline G. Comstock (c. 1879–1920), a daughter of Clarence M. Comstock, in 1901. In New York City, they lived at 570 Park Avenue and had a summer home on Sicomac Road in Franklin Township, New Jersey (now Franklin Lakes). Together, they were the parents of:

- Harriet C. Simmons, who married banker and soldier Sheldon Townsend Coleman (1901–1963). They married at St. George's Church in Stuyvesant Square in 1923.
- Cornelia Neilson Simmons (1905–1995), who married Theodore Cole Romaine (1900–1968), a son of Louis T. Romaine, in 1928. The wedding was held at St. Bartholomew's Church with a reception at Sherry's.

After the death of his first wife in 1920 from an "overdose of a drug taken to induce sleep," he remarried to the former Beatrice Vanderpoel Bogert (1881–1942) at the Park Avenue Presbyterian Church on October 4, 1929, just twenty days before the Wall Street crash of 1929. After a two-month honeymoon to Hawaii, they lived at his home at 812 Park Avenue on Manhattan's Upper East Side. Beatrice, a divorcee who was the daughter of Eugene Thurston Bogert and Anna (née Vanderpoel) Bogert, had been previously married to lawyer William Bayard Blackwell II (with whom she had William Bayard Blackwell III). Beatrice left her husband for his friend John Mayer Jr., a grandson of Theodore Havemeyer, prompting a $200,000 lawsuit from Blackwell for the "alleged alienation of affections of Mrs. Beatrice Bogert Blackwell" in 1914. Beatrice and John married in September 1915, but later divorced in Reno in April 1929 before she married Simmons in 1929.

His second wife died at their home, 812 Park Avenue, in June 1942, and Simmons died on May 21, 1955.

=== Descendants ===
Through his daughter Cornelia, he was a grandfather of Arthur Comstock Romaine, a Harvard University graduate who married Dorothy Stevens in 1964. Romaine, president of Webster Management, a Kidder, Peabody & Co., later married Deborah Vaughan in 1982.

Business positions
Preceded by Seymour L. Cromwell	President of the New York Stock Exchange; 1924–1930	Succeeded by Richard Whitney
