= William J. Fallon (attorney) =

American lawyer

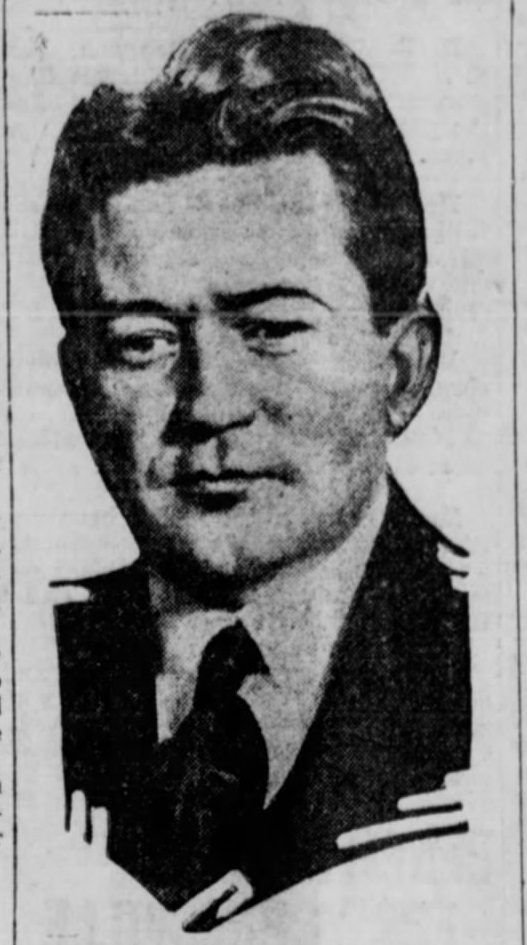
- Born: January 23, 1886
- Died: April 29, 1927 (aged 41)
- Education: Fordham University; Fordham University School of Law
- Occupation: Lawyer

William J. Fallon (January 23, 1886 – April 29, 1927), christened The Great Mouthpiece by the press, was a prominent American defense attorney during the 1920s who defended the gangster Arnold Rothstein and his accomplice Nicky Arnstein during the trial for the fixing of the 1919 World Series.

== Early life and education ==
Fallon was born in Manhattan in 1886 and graduated valedictorian of the Fordham class of 1906, and then went on to attend Fordham Law School in 1909. After his graduation he worked for three years as a prosecutor in Westchester County, New York.

== Career ==
At the urging of Governor Charles S. Whitman he unsuccessfully prosecuted the warden of Sing Sing prison Thomas Osborne on trumped-up charges, including "gross immorality" with prisoners, because the governor wished to be rid of a prison reformer whom he considered too soft. In 1918 he set up a law firm with his friend Eugene F. McGee; it was around this time that he met Arnold Rothstein, who was taken by the polished charm of the lawyer, who was known for his oratory skills taught to him during his Jesuit education and his reputed photographic memory that allowed him to memorize whole books in hours. During the Black Sox trial, Fallon had a falling out with his client Nicky Arnstein because of his noticeable heavy drinking. Arnstein fired Fallon and was later found guilty. Afterward Fallon defended many white collar criminals involved with stock fraud; his tendency to get hung juries attracted the attention of muckrakers, and in 1924 he was tried and acquitted for jury tampering. However, his reputation was damaged and his career never recovered. He was also prosecuted in the Fuller case.

== Death and legacy ==
Fallon died at the early age of 41 on April 29, 1927, from complications of his excessive lifestyle. Four years after his death, a popular biography written by Gene Fowler was published, which inspired the Warner Brothers films The Mouthpiece (1932), The Man Who Talked Too Much (1940) and Illegal (1955). He has been cited as one of the inspirations for the celebrity lawyer Billy Flynn in the popular musical Chicago. He is also portrayed for six episodes by David Aaron Baker in the HBO television series Boardwalk Empire.
