= Reverse stock split =

Financial process

In finance, a reverse stock split or reverse split is a process by which shares of corporate stock are effectively merged to form a smaller number of proportionally more valuable shares.

The "reverse stock split" appellation is a reference to the more common stock split in which shares are effectively divided to form a larger number of proportionally less valuable shares. New shares are typically issued in a simple ratio, e.g. 1 new share for 2 old shares, 3 for 4, etc. A reverse split is the opposite of a stock split.

Typically, the exchange temporarily adds a "D" to the end of a ticker symbol during a reverse stock split. Sometimes a company may concurrently change its name. This is known as a name change and consolidation (i.e. using a different ticker symbol for the new shares).

There is a stigma attached to doing a reverse stock split, as it underscores the fact that shares have declined in value, so it is not common and may take a shareholder or board meeting for consent. Many institutional investors and mutual funds, for example, have rules against purchasing a stock whose price is below some minimum, for example US$5, the boundary price below which the SEC considers a stock to be a penny stock. A common reason for a reverse stock split is to satisfy a stock exchange's minimum share price.

A reverse stock split may be used to reduce the number of shareholders. If a company completes a reverse split in which 1 new share is issued for every 100 old shares, any investor holding fewer than 100 shares would simply receive a cash payment. If the number of shareholders drops, the company may be placed into a different regulatory category and may be governed by different law—for example, in the U.S., whether a company is regulated by the SEC depends in part on the number of shareholders.

From time to time, companies will issue a reverse split concurrently with a forward split, making a reverse/forward split. Note that in reverse/forward splits, the shareholder's old shares are erased, as they receive a number of new shares in proportion to their original holdings. By contrast, in a simple stock split, the original shares remain on the exchange as shareholders receive additional shares based on their existing holdings. In both stock splits and reverse splits, the share price is adjusted in proportion to the increase in shares to maintain equal value.

As an example of how reverse splits work, ProShares Ultrashort Silver (NYSE Arca: ZSL), an inverse exchange-traded fund tracking the Bloomberg Silver Subindex, underwent a 1-10 reverse split on April 15, 2010, which grouped every 10 shares into one share; accordingly, this multiplied the close price by 10, so the stock finished at $36.45 instead of $3.645. On February 25, 2011, ZSL had a 1-4 reverse split (every 4 shares became one share, which multiplied the close price by 4, to $31.83). Because of these two actions, one share of ZSL as of February 26, 2011 represents 40 shares of ZSL before April 15, 2010. These splits were necessary to maintain the share price of the fund, whose value fell 90.2% from April 15, 2010 to April 21, 2011, and over 98% since December 3, 2008. Had the reverse splits not taken place, ZSL's closing price on April 21, 2011 would have been $0.3685, rather than $14.74, or .3685*40.
