= Fifth Church of Christ, Scientist (New York City) =

Church in Manhattan, New York

Coordinates: 40°45′14.18″N 73°58′46.15″W

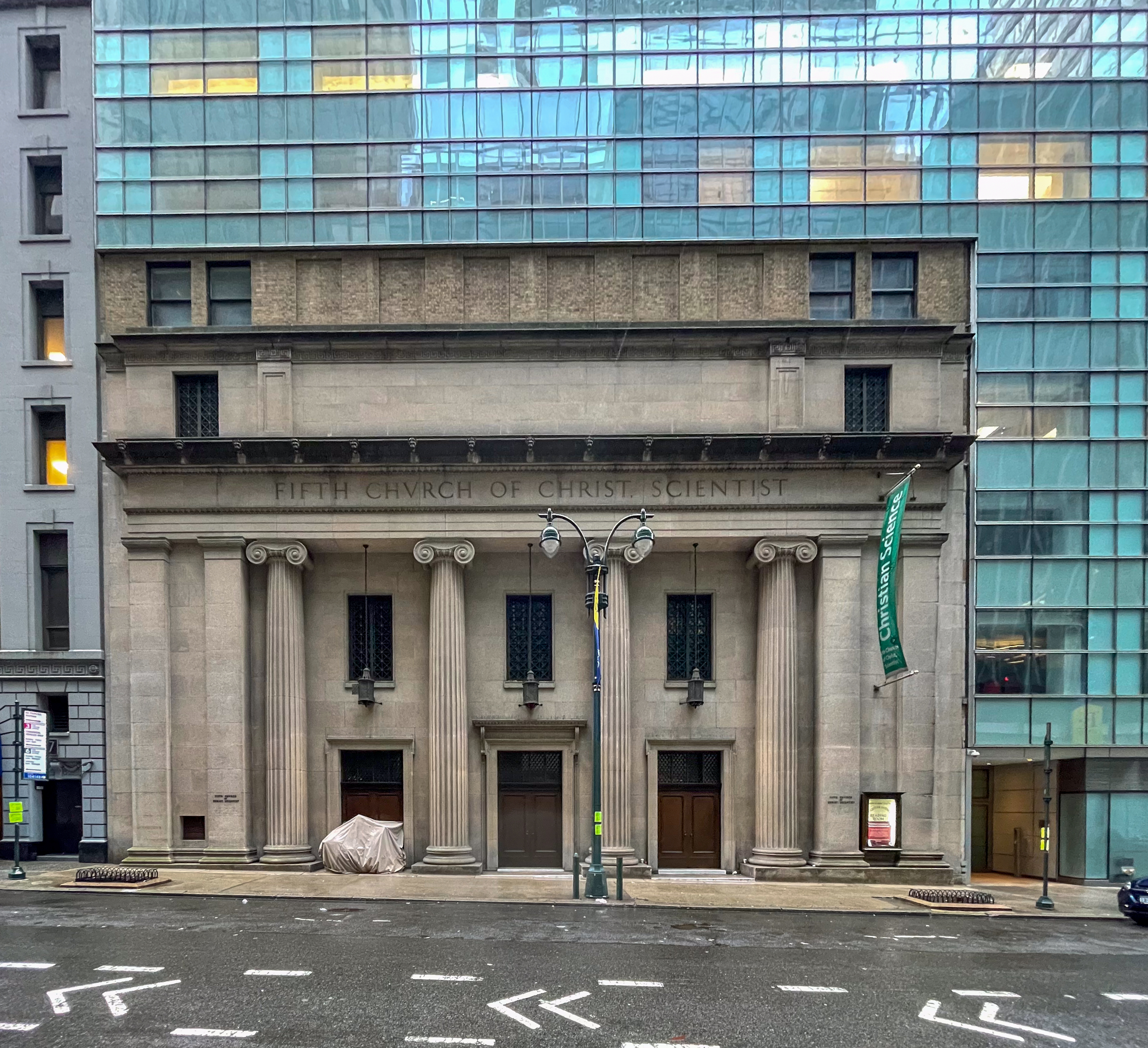
- Fifth Church of Christ, Scientist

General information
- Architectural style: Classical Revival.
- Location: 9 East 43rd Street near Madison Avenue, Manhattan, New York, United States
- Construction started: 1921
- Completed: 1921

Fifth Church of Christ, Scientist is a historic Classical Revival-style Christian Science church building located at 9 East 43rd Street near Madison Avenue and Grand Central Terminal in Manhattan, New York City. Built in 1921 on the previous site of St. Bartholomew's Episcopal Church, Fifth Church of Christ, Scientist, occupies part of the first two stories of a 21-story office building that was originally named the Canadian Pacific Building. The church's sanctuary seats 1,800 people.

== History ==
Organized in 1901, Fifth Church of Christ, Scientist, met first at 228 West 45th Street in the former building of another Episcopal church, the Church of Saint Mary the Virgin. Around 1911 the congregation moved to a church building at 245 Madison Avenue at East 38th Street which had been built for Zion Episcopal Church and later used by South (Dutch) Reformed Church. This building was razed in 1917. In 1921, Fifth Church became part of a bonding arrangement for the construction of the 21-story Canadian Pacific Building. Under it the church received a long-term lease for the space it still occupies.

== Current status ==
Fifth Church of Christ, Scientist, is still an active congregation in this location. The Canadian Pacific Building after being known as 342 Madison Avenue for years is now 340 Madison Avenue and has been extensively remodeled to present a modern glass exterior.
