= Round lot =

A round lot (or board lot) is a normal unit of trading of a security, which is usually 100 shares of stock in US. Each stock exchange has its own regulations regarding round lot sizes: they can range anywhere from 1-100 shares, depending on the exchange. Any quantity less than this normal unit is referred to as an odd lot.

== See also ==
- Odd lot
- Odd lotter
