= Edward M. Fuller & Company =

- Type: Stock brokerage
- Industry: Financial services
- Founded: 1914
- Founders: William Frank McGee and Edward M. Fuller
- Defunct: June 27, 1922
- Fate: Filed for bankruptcy
- Headquarters: 50 Broad Street, Manhattan, New York City, United States
- Key people: William Frank McGee, Edward M. Fuller
- Products: Stockbroking

Edward M. Fuller & Company was a prominent New York stock brokerage. Founded in 1914 and owned by the sole partners William Frank McGee and Edward M. Fuller, by 1922 it was the largest brokerage on the Little Board. The firm went bankrupt in 1922, resulting in a high-profile legal case and indictments against the former partners.

== History ==
=== Founding and new branches ===
The New York City brokerage firm Edward M. Fuller & Company was founded in 1914. The firm joined as a member of the Consolidated Stock Exchange of New York in February 1918, and remained listed as of 1922. By 1922, it was the largest brokerage house on the Consolidated Exchange, with only two members of the firm: Edward M. Fuller and W. F. McGee. There were two offices in New York, one uptown and one at 50 Broad Street. By late June 1922, it had successful branches in Chicago, Boston, Cleveland, Pittsburgh, and Uniontown, Pennsylvania. The firm had the accounts of 1,500 to 1,800 people, with 2,100 customers in Chicago. As of June 1922, Edward M. Fuller's office remained at 50 Broad Street. That month, a woman was given a suspended sentence for threatening Fuller with a non-existent gun at his office over an alleged agreement between her, the brokerage, and Arnold Rothstein.

=== Bankruptcy ===
In February 1922 all trading records at the Consolidated Stock Exchange were broken after months of good business. Later that month, however, several brokerages and firms within the exchange failed "without warning," shocking the industry. In mid-July a new series of unexpected failures occurred at Consolidated, including Edward M. Fuller & Company, which failed on June 27, 1922 for $6,000,000. In the bankruptcy petition filed in the U.S. District Court in New York, assets were estimated at $250,000 and liabilities at $500,000. The New York Times, however, reported that the Chicago outlook was that there were negligible assets to offset the customer claims totaling $1,250,000. Hays, St. John & Moore of 43 Exchange Place were hired as attorneys for the firm.

On June 27, 1922, the firm was suspended from the Consolidated Exchange, with Consolidated president William S. Silkworth attributing the suspension to "reckless and unbusinesslike methods" and a failure to meet commitments. To explain the failure, Silkworth also argued that Edward Fuller had been hit hard in Mexican Petroleum stock. However, as W. S. Silkworth's brother George Silkworth had been a partner at Fuller, accusations of insider corruption abounded. Fuller of Great Neck, New York did not comment on the failure, while his partner William F. McGee of 73rd Street was also unavailable that day. According to the Times, the next day employees filtered in to find no executives explaining the failure, and everything except furniture removed from the office spaces. The Times also repeated the rumor that the firm's private files had been broken into and circulated directly after the failure, possibly by a clerk.

=== Fuller bankruptcy case ===
On August 2, 1922, District Attorney Banton was denied access to the books of E. M. Fuller Co. to use in pursuing a case against the firm. Albert Ottinger began working on an investigation into the Fuller bankruptcy in December 1922 out of the Anti-Fraud Bureau in New York. The Ottinger investigation began in late May.

William Silkworth testified about the bankruptcy on June 6, 1923 and on June 7 he appeared in the Criminal Courts Building. Although Assistant Attorney General William F. McKenna failed to implicate Silkworth in the Fuller bankruptcy, he did uncover irregularities in Silkworth's personal finances. The irregularities showed he had made large deposits in March 1922, some related to the Fuller account.

In mid June 1923, Edward M. Fuller pled guilty to bucketing customers orders. He appeared on June 18, 1923 before Coffin to "reveal the methods of his firm" and the names of his superiors, and the superiors of his partner W. Frank McGee. William Silkworth resigned as Consolidated president on June 21, 1923 and soon after went on a "long vacation." After examining the papers of the firm, on June 27, 1923, William M. Chadbourne, counsel for the 4,000 creditors of E.M. Fuller Co., informed United States District Attorney William Hayward and District Attorney Joab H. Banton that the firm had committed "crimes other than bucketing." Edward M. Fuller and William F. McGee were sent to jail on June 6, 1927 by General Session Judge Charles C. Nott. They both received parole from Sing Sing Prison the day before June 1, 1928. On June 19, 1928, it was reported that the Division of Licenses had refused to give McGee and Fuller licenses as realty brokers, which had been their "reported intention." The division felt the two men had lost their citizenship through their felony conviction, and that a provision of law deemed them unfit.
