= Stock split =

Method to increase a company's shares

A stock split or stock divide increases the number of shares in a company. For example, after a 2-for-1 split, each investor will own double the number of shares, and each share will be worth half as much. A stock split causes a decrease of market price of individual shares, but does not change the total market capitalization of the company; stock dilution does not occur.

A company may split its stock when the market price per share is so high that it becomes unwieldy when traded. One of the reasons is that a very high share price may deter small investors from buying the shares. Stock splits are usually initiated after a large run up in share price.

== Effects ==
The main effect of stock splits is an increase in the liquidity of a stock: there are more buyers and sellers for 10 shares at $10 than 1 share at $100. Some companies avoid a stock split to obtain the opposite strategy: by refusing to split the stock and keeping the price high, they reduce trading volume. Berkshire Hathaway is a notable example of this. As of 2025, the company has never split its stock and trades at over US$750,000.

One possible explanation for increased trading volume is confusion. If some investors are unable to recognize that a split stock should trade at a lower price than before the split, the result can be a temporary increase in demand and the share price. Others contend that the management of a company, by initiating a stock split, is implicitly signaling its confidence in the future prospects of the company.

In a market where there is a high minimum number of shares, or a penalty for trading in so-called odd lots (a non multiple of some arbitrary number of shares), a reduced share price may attract more attention from small investors. Small investors such as these, however, will have negligible impact on the overall price.

== Split ratios ==
Ratios of 2-for-1, 3-for-1, and 3-for-2 splits are the most common, but any ratio is possible. Splits of 4-for-3, 5-for-2, and 5-for-4 are used, though less frequently. Investors will sometimes receive cash payments in lieu of fractional shares.

In the above examples ‘y-for-x’ Shows the number of shares before (x) and after (y). Other common reporting nomenclatures are ‘x-y’ and ‘stock dividend’ of [=]y-x. In the above ‘3-for-1’ example (or 1-3 and 2 share stock dividend) would mean a stockholder holding 100 shares (on record date) will receive 200 new shares after the split for those 100 shares.

== Example ==
A company which has 100 issued shares priced at $50 per share, has a market capitalization of $5000 = 100 × $50. If the company splits its stock 2-for-1, there are now 200 shares of stock and each shareholder holds twice as many shares. The price of each share is adjusted to $25 = $5000 / 200. The market capitalization is 200 × $25 = $5000, the same as before the split.

== Currency ==
The analog in currency would be redenomination. This would be where a currency increases in value so that people have to use small fractions. Then a new unit (such as dollar) can be introduced, such that an old unit is equal to 10 (or some number) new units.

An example is with the Australian currency. In 1966 the Australian pound was split into two Australian dollars.

== Effect on historical charts ==
When a stock splits, many charts show it similarly to a dividend payout and therefore do not show a dramatic dip in price. Taking the same example as above, a company with 100 shares of stock priced at $50 per share. The company splits its stock 2-for-1. There are now 200 shares of stock and each shareholder holds twice as many shares.

The price of each share is adjusted to $25. As a result, when looking at a historical chart, one might expect to see the stock dropping from $50 to $25. To avoid these discontinuities, many charts use what is known as an adjusted share price; that is, they divide all closing prices before the split by the split ratio. Thus, when looking at the charts it will seem as if the price was always $25. Both the Yahoo! historical price charts and the Google historical price charts show the adjusted close prices.

== See also ==
- Reverse stock split
- Share repurchase also known as stock buyback
- Market depth
