= Bill Fallon =

Australian rules footballer

Personal information
- Full name: William John Fallon
- Born: 28 June 1939
- Died: 26 February 1998 (aged 58)
- Original team: South Melbourne Districts
- Height: 179 cm (5 ft 10 in)
- Weight: 75 kg (165 lb)

Playing career^{1}
| Years | Club | Games (Goals) |
| 1959 | South Melbourne | 3 (0) |
- ^{1} Playing statistics correct to the end of 1959.

William John Fallon (28 June 1939 – 26 February 1998) was an Australian rules footballer who played with South Melbourne in the Victorian Football League (VFL).
