= Martin Act =

Anti-fraud legislation in New York

The Martin Act (New York General Business Law article 23-A, sections 352–353) is a New York anti-fraud law, widely considered to be the most severe blue sky law in the country. Passed in 1921, it grants the Attorney General of New York expansive law enforcement powers to conduct investigations of securities fraud and bring civil or criminal actions against alleged violators of the Act. It was used infrequently until the early 2000s, when then-Attorney General Eliot Spitzer began using it to bring civil cases against Wall Street firms. It has since become the basis for a number of high-profile cases, including a 2002 investigation of Merrill Lynch for alleged conflicts of interest, and the 2012 suit against Bank of New York Mellon Corp. for allegedly defrauding customers through foreign currency transactions.

== Background ==
The Martin Act was passed by the New York Legislature in 1921, bearing the name of its sponsor in the state assembly, Louis M. Martin. New York was one of the last states to pass an act of this kind, termed "blue sky laws," due in part to lobbying from the state's financial institutions The New York Legislature reportedly intended for the Martin Act to be an "anemic" regulation, leaving the Attorney General of New York's Office with minimal control over who could sell securities.

In 1925, Albert Ottinger became the first New York Attorney General to make use of the Act in high-profile cases, ultimately using it to shut down the Consolidated Stock Exchange. Following Ottinger's tenure, subsequent attorneys general did not follow his lead, and the Act remained largely dormant for decades. For the remainder of the 20th century, the Act was known mainly for investigations of "small-time fraud." This period has been characterized as the product of an "unspoken gentleman's agreement" between Wall Street and the New York Attorney General's Office, whereby the Attorney General's Office agreed not to use the Act against more significant players on Wall Street.

Eliot Spitzer is said to have revived the law during his tenure as Attorney General. In 2001, his office launched a Martin Act investigation against Merrill Lynch for suspected fraud. When the investigation was made public, Merrill's market value dropped $5 billion in one week. Ultimately, Merrill settled, agreeing to pay a $100 million fine and change the way its analysts are paid to head off possible criminal charges that it misled investors with tainted stock research. Spitzer followed up by bringing Martin Act cases against the entire investment banking industry, forcing New York's 10 biggest investment firms to pay $1.4 billion in fines. Other notable Martin Act cases from the Spitzer era included many against hedge funds, as well as one launched against the mutual fund industry for its practices of late trading and market timing.

Spitzer's successor, Eric Schneiderman, continued to aggressively use the Martin Act against high-profile companies and Wall Street Banks. For example, he leveraged the Martin Act to investigate Exxon for purportedly misleading the public about climate change.

== Provisions ==
It is widely recognized that the powers granted to the Attorney General of New York under the Martin Act exceed those given to any regulator in any other state. The Act vests the attorney general with sole responsibility for its implementation and enforcement, and authorizes them to pursue both equitable and monetary relief.

=== Violations ===
The Martin Act has been interpreted to prohibit all deceitful practices, as well as false promises, related to the offer, sale, or purchase of securities and commodities within or from New York. Notably, to secure a conviction, the state is not required to prove scienter (except in connection with felonies) or an actual purchase or sale or damages resulting from the fraud.

=== Investigative powers ===
The Martin Act further empowers New York Attorneys General to conduct investigations into fraudulent practices. When conducting an investigation, the attorney general is not required to demonstrate probable cause or disclose the details of the investigation, and has discretion to keep the investigation confidential to avoid unwarranted market reaction. The Act also permits the Attorney General to issue subpoenas to compel attendance of witnesses and production of documents deemed relevant or material to an investigation. Those called in for questioning during such investigations do not have a right to counsel or a right against self-incrimination. Furthermore, the attorney general's decision to conduct an investigation is not reviewable by courts.

=== Enforcement ===
Civilly, the attorney general may bring an action under the act to obtain preliminary or permanent injunctive relief against defendant selling or offering to sell securities in New York. Violation of a Martin Act injunction is a misdemeanor, punishable by a cumulative civil penalty of $3,000 per violation.

Criminally, the attorney general may assume a prosecutorial rule to punish both misdemeanors and felonies. Misdemeanors are punishable by a fine of up to $500 or imprisonment of up to one year, or both. Felonies carry a penalty of up to four years of imprisonment.

In 2020, New York Attorney General Letitia James clarified longstanding uncertainty regarding the Martin Act's treatment of private placements made in New York pursuant to the federal Securities Act, indicating that New York considered such offerings to be "to the public" and subject to the Martin Act. The announcement also indicated New York would acknowledge federal preemption for offerors that filed a Form D and submitted a notice filing and fee to New York.

== Judicial interpretation ==
Much of the Martin Act's power is attributable to early court cases upholding its provisions. In 1926, the New York Court of Appeals held in People v. Federated Radio Corp. that proof of fraudulent intent was unnecessary for prosecution under the Act. In 1930, the court elaborated that the Act should "be liberally and sympathetically construed in order that its beneficial purpose may, so far as possible, be attained."

For much of the Act's history, one of the questions left open was whether it conferred a private right of action to victims of securities fraud. The New York Court of Appeals settled this issue in 1987, holding that there is no private right of action. In reaching this holding, the court reasoned that no private right of action was expressly authorized, and found that an implied private right of action would be inconsistent with the enforcement mechanism created by the Act.

== Criticism ==
The Martin Act has been criticized as "unjust," authorizing penalties that are "arbitrary and unfair." Among the law's controversial aspects is the absence of a requirement that the state prove a defendant had intent to defraud, which gives prosecutors a significant advantage over defendants.
