= Bucket shop (stock market) =

Business that allows gambling based on the prices of stocks or commodities

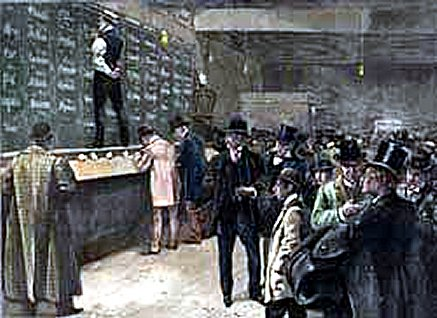
A scene from a bucket shop in 1892.

A bucket shop is a business that allows gambling based on the prices of stocks or commodities. A 1906 U.S. Supreme Court ruling defined a bucket shop as "an establishment, nominally for the transaction of a stock exchange business, or business of similar character, but really for the registration of bets, or wagers, usually for small amounts, on the rise or fall of the prices of stocks, grain, oil, etc., there being no transfer or delivery of the stock or commodities nominally dealt in".

A person who engages in the practice is referred to as a bucketeer and the practice is sometimes referred to as bucketeering. Bucket shops were found in many large American cities from the mid-1800s but the practice was eventually ruled illegal and largely disappeared by the 1920s.

Edward Chancellor describes bucket shops as an early form of unregulated finance options, given that people invested on anticipated future price movements without holding the underlying asset similar to how modern futures operate.

== Overview ==
=== Definition and term origin ===
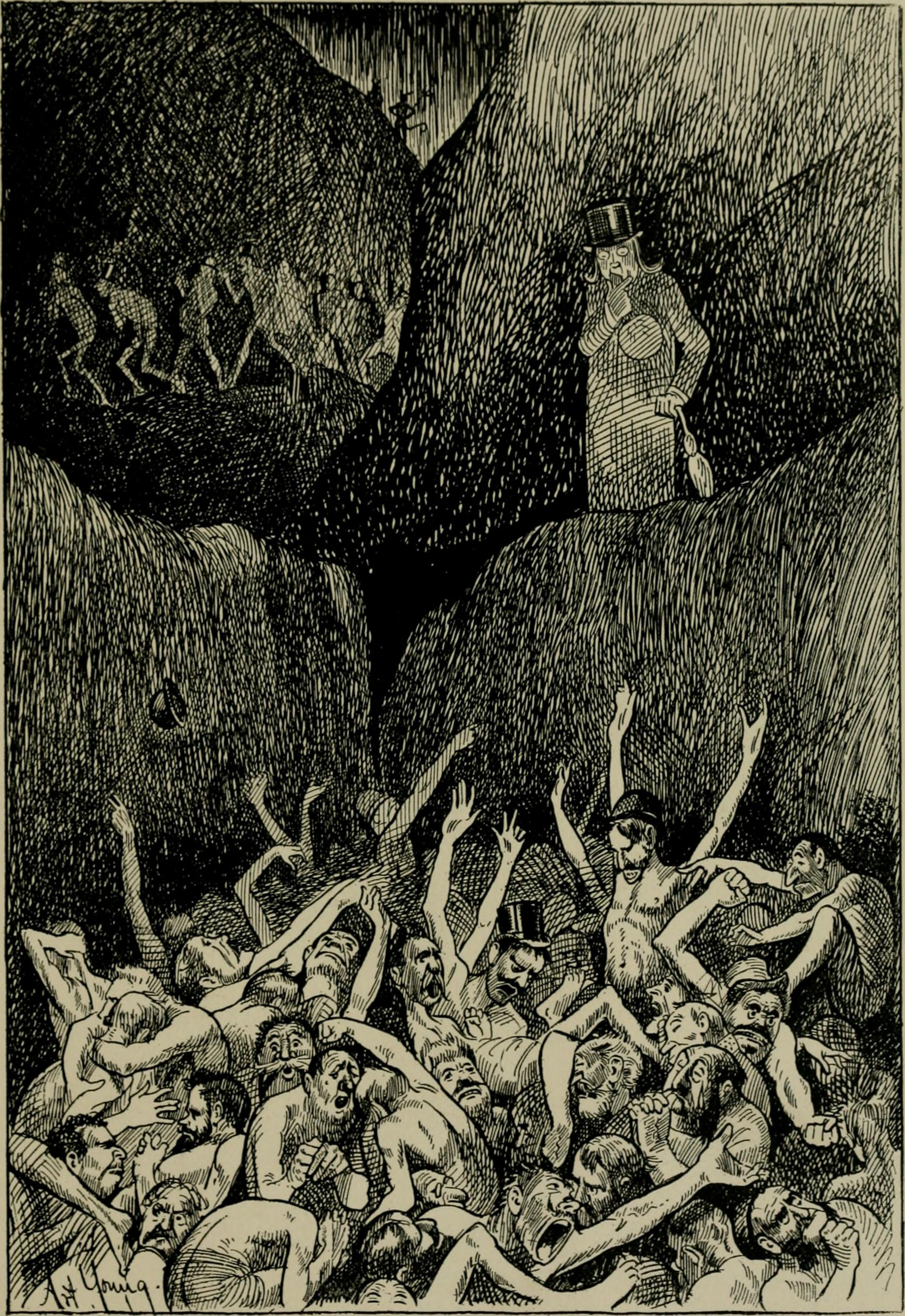
A scene from Through Hell with Hiprah Hunt, Art Young's 1901 retelling of Dante's Inferno: "Peering down the jaws of a deep pit he sees the souls of the bucket-shop gamblers."

According to The New York Times in 1958, a bucket shop is "an office with facilities for making bets in the form of orders or options based on current exchange prices of securities or commodities, but without any actual buying or selling of the property". Bucket shops are sometimes mentioned together with boiler rooms as examples of securities fraud, but they are distinct types. While a boiler room operator seeks to broker actual security trades, the bucket shop's emphasis is on creating the appearance of brokerage activity where none exists.

The term originated from England in the 1820s, when street children drained the beer and liquor kegs that were discarded from public houses. The children sold the alcohol to unlicensed bars, where it was mixed together and sold to unwary patrons. These bars became known as "bucket shops." The idea was transferred to illegal brokers who sought to profit from trading activity that was too small or disreputable for legitimate brokers.

=== Legality ===
Bucket shop is a defined term in the many U.S. states that criminalize the operation of a bucket shop. Typically the criminal law definition refers to an operation in which the customer is sold what is supposed to be a derivative interest in a security or commodity future, but there is no transaction made on any exchange. The transaction goes "in the bucket" and is never executed. Because no trading of actual securities occurs, the customer is essentially betting against the bucket shop operator in a game based on abstract security prices. In a bucket shop, the parties agree to imagine themselves as following the events occurring in a real exchange. Alternatively, the bucket shop operator "literally 'plays the bank', as in a gambling house, against the customer".

Bucketing of orders violates several provisions of U.S. securities law. These prohibitions apply to legitimate brokerages as well as bucket shops.

== History of bucket shops ==
=== In the United States (c. 1870 – c. 1920) ===
Bucket shops specializing in stocks and commodity futures appeared in the United States in the 1870s, corresponding to the innovation of stock tickers upon which they depended. In 1889, the New York Stock Exchange addressed the "ticker trouble" (bucket shops operating on intraday stock price movements), and attempted to suppress bucket shops by disconnecting telegraphic stock tickers. This embargo instead proved a severe hindrance to the Exchange's wealthy local clients, as well as the Exchange's brokers in other cities across the country. It also had the surprising effect of favoring competing exchanges, and was abandoned within days.

Edwin Lefèvre, who is believed to have been writing on behalf of Jesse Lauriston Livermore, described the operations of bucket shops in the 1890s in detail. The terms of trade varied among bucket shops, but they typically offered margin trading schemes to customers, with leverage ratios as extreme as 100:1 (a deposit of $1 cash would permit the client to "buy" $100 in stock). Since the trades were illusory and not settled in the real market, the shop likewise made no real margin loans, but did collect interest in cash from the client. The client could easily imagine that he had been loaned a great sum of capital (in fact an illusion) for a small cash deposit and interest payment.

To further tilt possible outcomes in their favor, most bucket shops also refused to make margin calls. The elimination of margin calls was portrayed as a benefit and convenience to the client, who would not be burdened by the possibility of an additional cash demand, and touted as a feature unavailable from genuine brokerages. This actually made the client more vulnerable to a heightened risk of ruin, with the losses flowing entirely to the bucket shop. In this situation, if the stock price should fall even momentarily to the limit of the client's margin (highly likely with thin, highly leveraged margins in volatile markets), the client instantly forfeits the entire cash investment to the shop's account.

Margin trading theoretically gives speculators amplified gains, but trading in a bucket shop exposes traders to small market manipulations due to the shop's agency. In a form of what is now considered illegal front running and self-dealing, a bucket shop holding a large position on a stock, and knowing a client's vulnerable margin, might sell the stock on the real stock exchange, causing the price on the ticker tape to momentarily move down enough to exhaust the client's margins. Through its opportunistic actions, the bucket shop thereby gains 100% of the client's investment.

In the United States, the traditional pseudo-brokerage bucket shops came under increasing legal assault in the early 1900s, and were effectively eliminated before the 1920s. Shortly after the failure of many brokerages on the Consolidated Stock Exchange in 1922, the New York assembly passed the Martin Act, which essentially banned bucket shops.

== See also ==
- Binary option § Regulation and fraud
- Boiler room (business)
- Contract for difference § Bucket shops
- Forex scam
- Fuller case
- Guinness share-trading fraud
- Panic of 1901
- Panic of 1907
- Pump and dump
