= Odd lotter =

Type of investor

An odd lotter is an investor who purchases shares or other securities in small or unusual quantities. Stocks are typically traded in increments of 100 shares, a quantity known as a round lot or board lot. The cost of 100 shares of a security may be beyond the means of an individual investor, or may represent a larger investment than the investor wishes to make. Thus, the investor purchases an odd lot.

== Odd lot theory ==
Odd lotters were central to a historical theory of technical analysis known as odd lot theory. Odd lot theory was predicated on the belief that one could outperform the stock market by identifying the least-informed investors and making investments opposite to them. (If the least-informed investors were selling, it was generally a good time to buy, and vice versa.)

Assuming that odd lotters were generally smaller investors with little market knowledge, practitioners of odd lot theory identified the actions of odd lotters and did the opposite. The actions of odd lotters were interpreted as contrary signals.

The theory is no longer popular as analysis of data shows little evidence that the method works. According to Princeton University economist Burton Malkiel: "It turns out that the odd-lotter isn't such a stupendous dodo after all. A little stupid? Maybe. There is some indication that the performance of odd-lotters might be slightly worse than the stock averages. However, the available evidence indicates that knowledge of odd-lotters' actions is not useful for the formulation of investment strategies."

The theory was the subject of much analysis in the 1960s and 1970s. By the 1990s, however, the theory had fallen out of use. In addition to the theory's general ineffectiveness, more and more individuals began to invest in mutual funds instead of individual stocks.

The term odd lot existed prior to use in finance and is used outside the financial industry for any irregular packaging in a general and objective sense.
