= Ariccia (Inness) =

1874 painting by George Inness

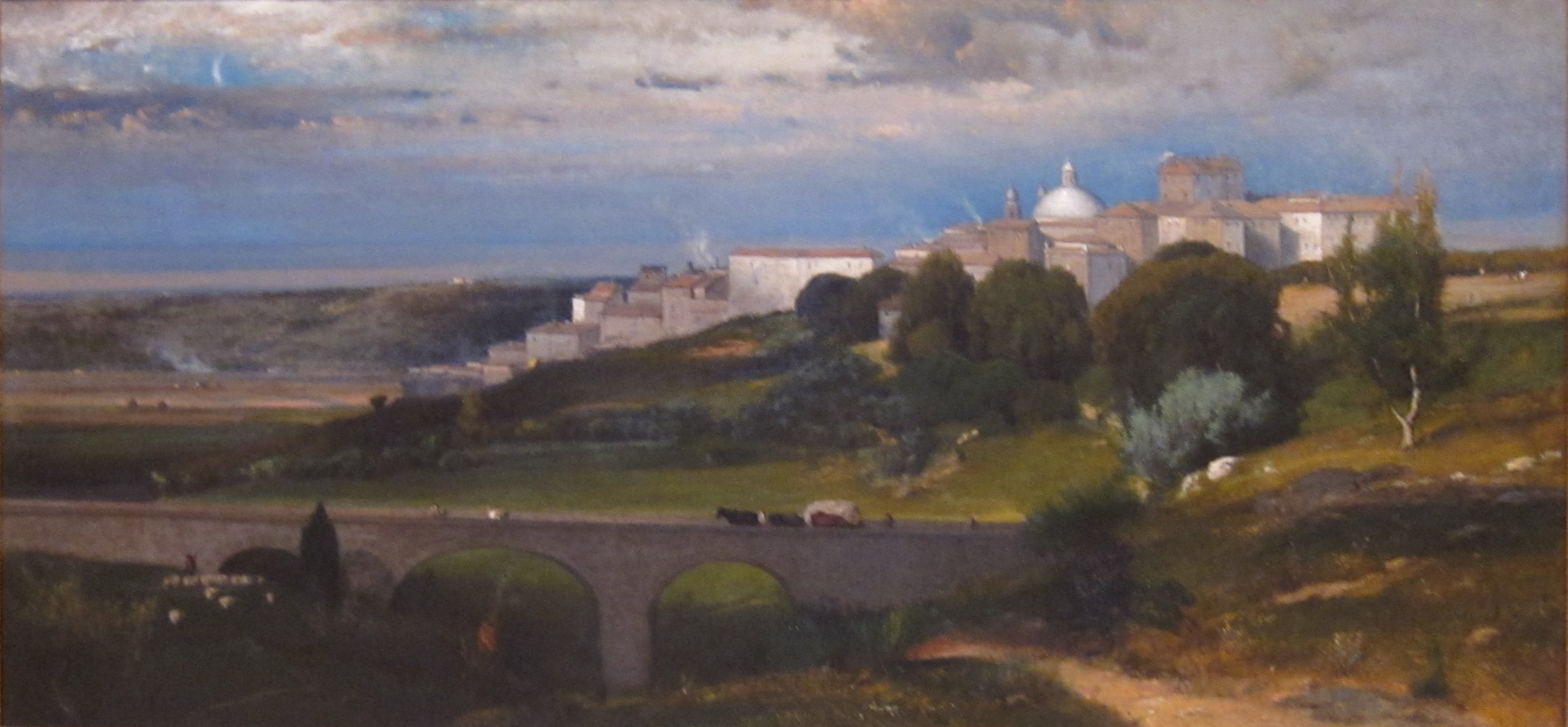
- Artist: George Inness
- Year: 1874
- Location: Timken Museum of Art, San Diego, California, U.S.

Ariccia is an 1874 oil painting on canvas by George Inness.
