= A Bit of the Roman Aqueduct =

19th-century American landscape painting

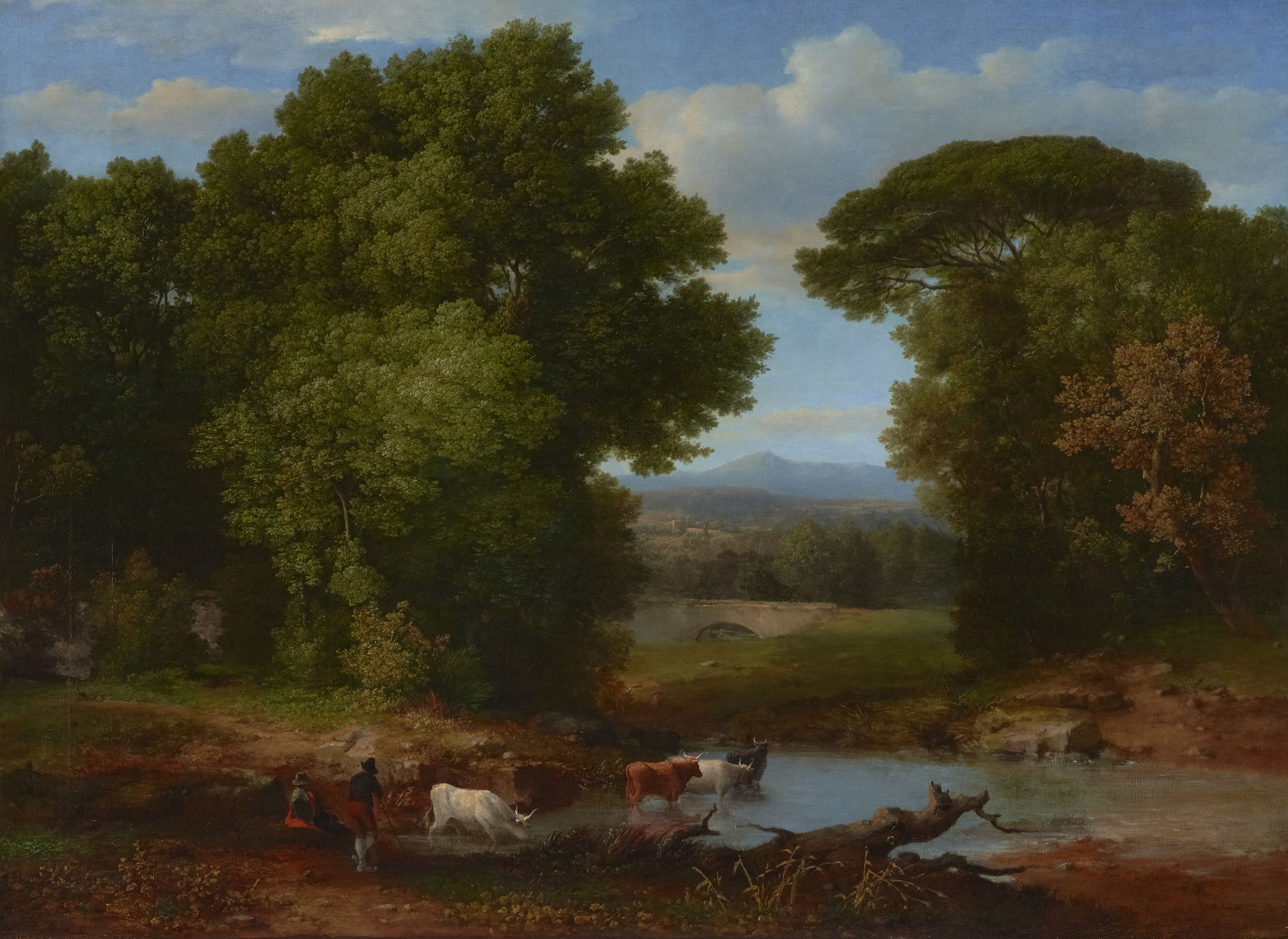
- Artist: George Inness
- Year: 1852
- Medium: Oil on canvas
- Dimensions: 99 cm × 136 cm (39 in × 53.6 in)
- Location: The High Museum of Art, Atlanta
- Accession: 69.42
- Website: high.org/collections/a-bit-of-the-roman-aqueduct/

A Bit of the Roman Aqueduct is a landscape painting by American painter George Inness. It was completed by the artist in 1852, likely in his studio in New York City. However, some scholarship suggests the possibility that Inness at least began work on the painting while in Italy the year before. The painting is held in the collections of the High Museum of Art in Atlanta, Georgia, where it is currently not on view.

== Context ==
George Inness enjoyed a strong and early start to his artistic career. Starting as a teenager, Inness studied under multiple artists around New York City, such as John Jesse Barker and, later, Régis Gignoux. He debuted at the National Academy of Design in 1844 at nineteen years of age. Founded a generation prior by some of the preeminent artists of the Hudson River School such as Thomas Cole and Asher Durand, the Academy steeped the young Inness in the contemporary orthodoxy of American landscape painting. Inness would go on to open his first studio in New York City in 1848, at which point he began accepting patronages and commissions from the public. Contemporary counterpart Arthur Hoeber wrote of Inness's early success that "in truth he was really never without a serious patronage almost from the beginning."

Inness received funding for his first voyage abroad through his patron, New York merchant Ogden Haggerty, in 1851. This would be the first of three journeys that Inness would make to Europe during his artistic career. Beginning in 1851, Inness took up residence in Rome for fifteen months, where he primarily studied the works and techniques of 17th-century masters such as Nicolas Poussin and Salvator Rosa. He rented a studio in Rome that was said to have been used by French landscape painter Claude Lorrain, as well as its more recent prior resident, Thomas Cole, who had reportedly used the space while on a European tour a decade prior in 1842. His inspiration from these studies would lead Inness to deviate from his American roots in the Hudson River School, known for its depictions of nature as being wild and imperfect. Rather, Inness would pursue a more idyllic and poetic approach to depicting nature, some of the first stages of such experimentation being seen in A Bit of the Roman Aqueduct and other works he produced during and following this first trip to Europe. Inness's style would go on to evolve through multiple additional stages throughout his life, arriving finally at a signature haziness for which the artist would be most known.

== Composition ==
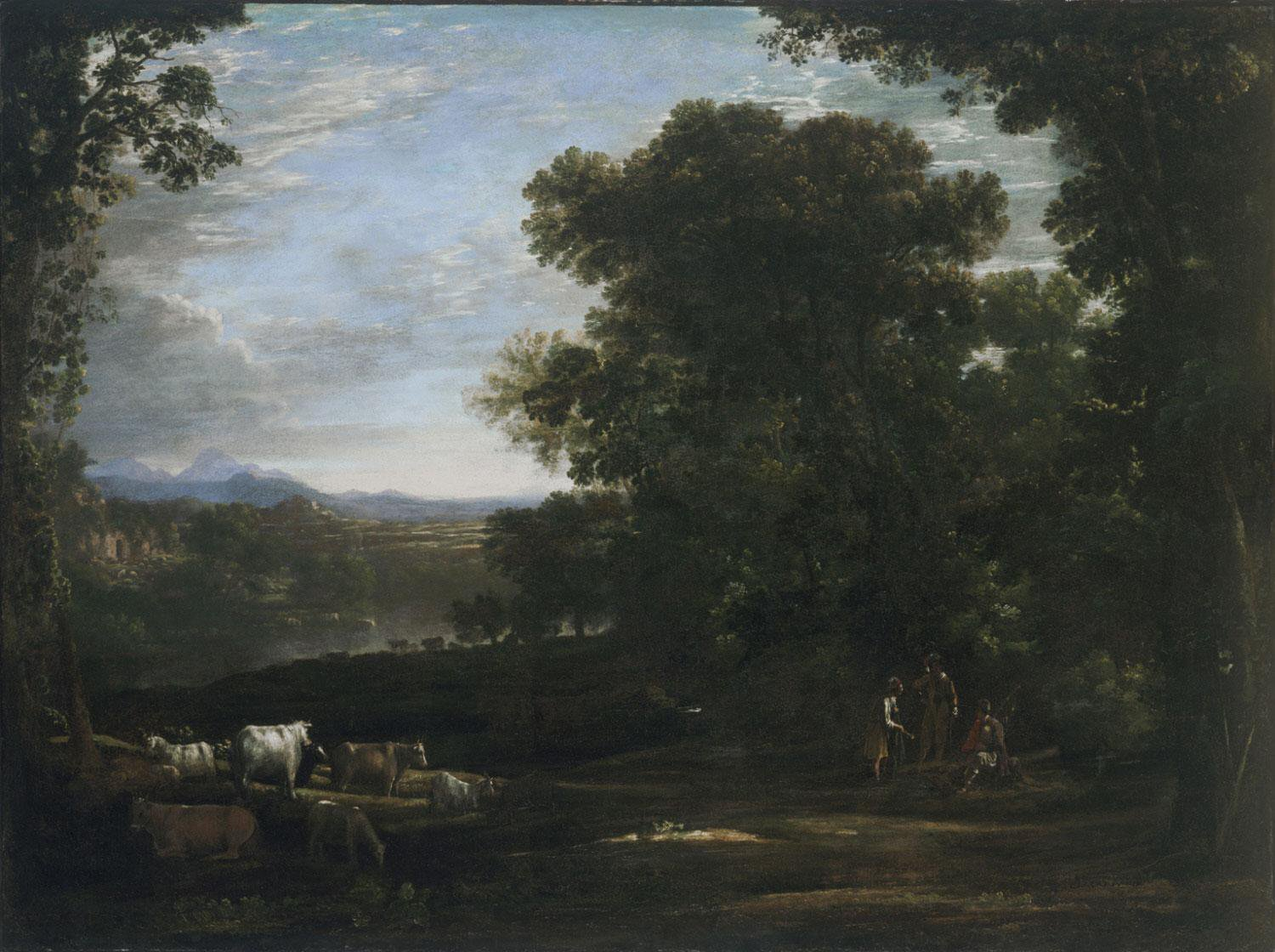
Landscape with Cattle and Peasants, painted by Claude Lorrain in 1629. Here can be seen a similar use of billowing vegetation framing the background in contrast to activity in the foreground, as well as similar themes of shepherds with cattle in a rural scene.

Most of A Bit of the Roman Aqueduct is dominated by towering foliage, which establishes the middle ground and frames the more distant background in contrast to the activity in the foreground. These bulging, verdant trees are the most striking example of the influence that the works of the 17th-century landscape painters, which Inness was studying while in Rome, had on the artist and his artistic product in this period. A comparison has been made to Lorrain's Landscape with Cattle and Peasants, showing a clear inspiration for Inness's own work in the motifs and techniques of Lorrain.

The foreground of the painting is host to its dynamic movement. This comes in the form of a pair of Italian shepherds leading their cattle to the stream that runs from the bottom-right corner of the canvas, through the trees, and eventually out of view into the background. Along the near-sided bank of this stream is a felled log, the gnarled branches of which extend out over the water. This appears as a vestige of Inness's origins in the Hudson River School, which depicted natural features as being more rugged. This log contrasts with the commanding trees overhead, which are painted much more in the idealized style of the 17th-century French landscapists.

The background is visible only through the gap in the middle ground's foliage. Continuing farther and farther into the distance, the background is composed of multiple layers that eventually reach the horizon of the painting. The foremost of these layers depicts a stone bridge that appears to cross over the same stream flowing through the foreground. Beyond this, a second layer of the background shows a plain with vegetation that is bisected by the aqueduct for which the painting is named. The arches of the aqueduct are so small as to be barely visible, alluding to the historical distance of Rome's ancient achievements. Completing the background is a final distant layer of rising land formations, beginning with sloping hills and eventually giving way to distant mountains.
