= Inness–Fitts House and Studio =

Historic house in Massachusetts, United States

- U.S. National Register of Historic Places
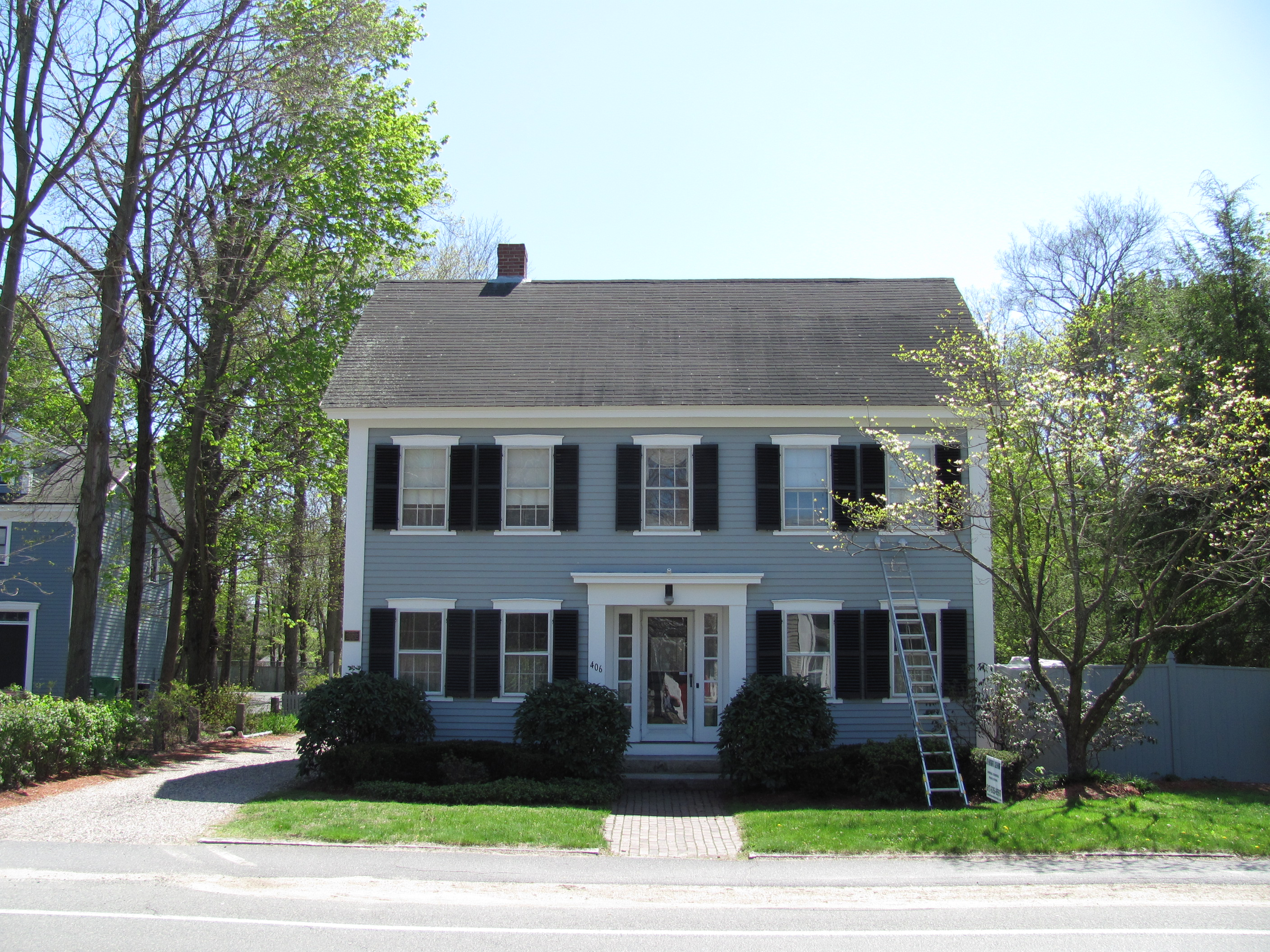
- Inness–Fitts House

- Location within Massachusetts Location within the United States
- Location: Medfield, Massachusetts
- Coordinates: 42°11′16″N 71°18′7″W
- Area: 1 acre (0.40 ha)
- Built: 1836
- Architect: George Inness
- Architectural style: Federal, Greek Revival
- NRHP reference No.: 02000153
- Added to NRHP: March 15, 2002

The Inness–Fitts House and Studio is a historic house at 406 Main Street in Medfield, Massachusetts. Built in 1836, it is a modest transitional Federal-Greek Revival structure. Southeast of the house stands a barn, probably built in the mid-18th century, which was adapted c. 1860 by artist George Inness for use as a studio. Inness lived here from 1860 to 1864. The property was listed on the National Register of Historic Places in 2002.

== Description and history ==
The Inness–Fitts property stands on the south side of Main Street (Massachusetts Route 109) in the Medfield's village center. It is a 2 1/2-story wood-frame structure, five bays wide, with a side-gable roof clapboard siding, granite foundation, and a single off-center chimney. The front (north-facing) facade is symmetrically arranged, with a recessed central entrance flanked by sidelight windows. The sides of the recess are framed by simple pilasters, and topped by a cornice. Sash windows fill the remaining bays, with slightly gabled lintels. Behind the house stands a small barn, 1 1/2 stories in height, with a gable roof. The north facade is finished in clapboards, with the gable decorated by vergeboard. Based on architectural analysis, it was built in about 1850.

The house was built about 1830, during a period of early industrial development in what was then an otherwise agrarian community. Its first notable owner was Daniel Clark Sanders, who lived in the house next door and owned this as one of several rental properties. Sanders, a minister, is notable as the first president of the University of Vermont, and was active locally in politics, serving as town selectman and in the state legislature. In 1860 the property was purchased by George Inness, an artist who became well known for his landscape paintings, based in part on his work done at his Medfield studio, which was located in the barn. Inness made a number of alterations to the barn for this purpose, plastering walls and adding skylights on the north side. The house was owned from 1874 to 1944 by Julius Fitts, owner of the local general store.

== See also ==
- National Register of Historic Places listings in Norfolk County, Massachusetts
