= Spring Blossoms, Montclair, New Jersey =

Painting by George Inness

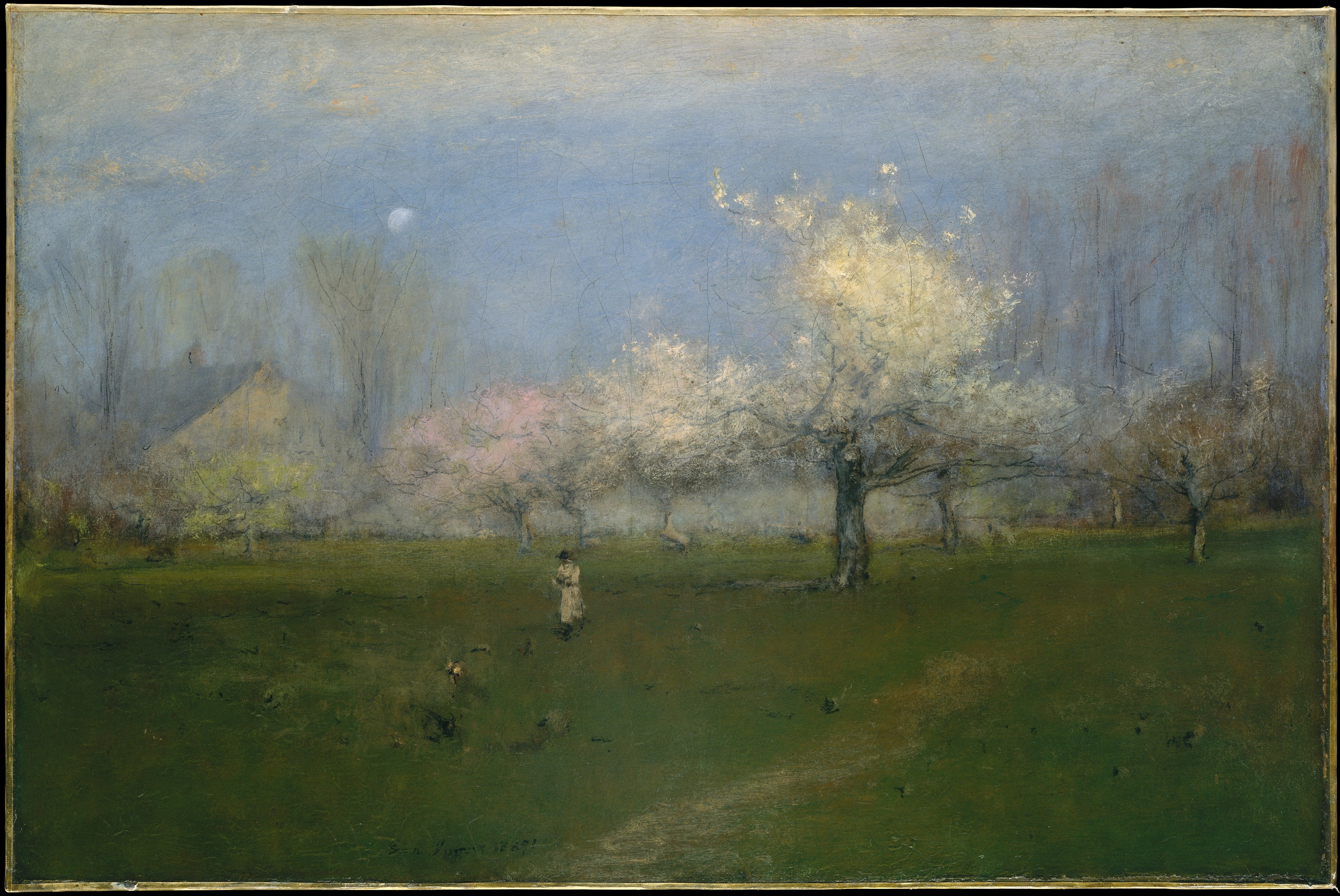
- Artist: George Inness
- Year: c. 1891
- Medium: Oil and crayon on canvas
- Dimensions: 73.7 cm × 114.9 cm (29.0 in × 45.2 in)
- Location: Metropolitan Museum of Art; New York City
- Accession: 11.116.4

Spring Blossoms, Montclair, New Jersey is a late 19th-century painting by American artist George Inness. The work is currently in the collection of the Metropolitan Museum of Art.

Done in oil and crayon (charcoal was also possibly used), the painting depicts Montclair, New Jersey in springtime. The style of Springtime is similar to paintings of the Hudson River School, by which Inness was influenced.

The work is on view in the Metropolitan Museum's Gallery 774.
