= Autumn Oaks =

Painting by George Inness

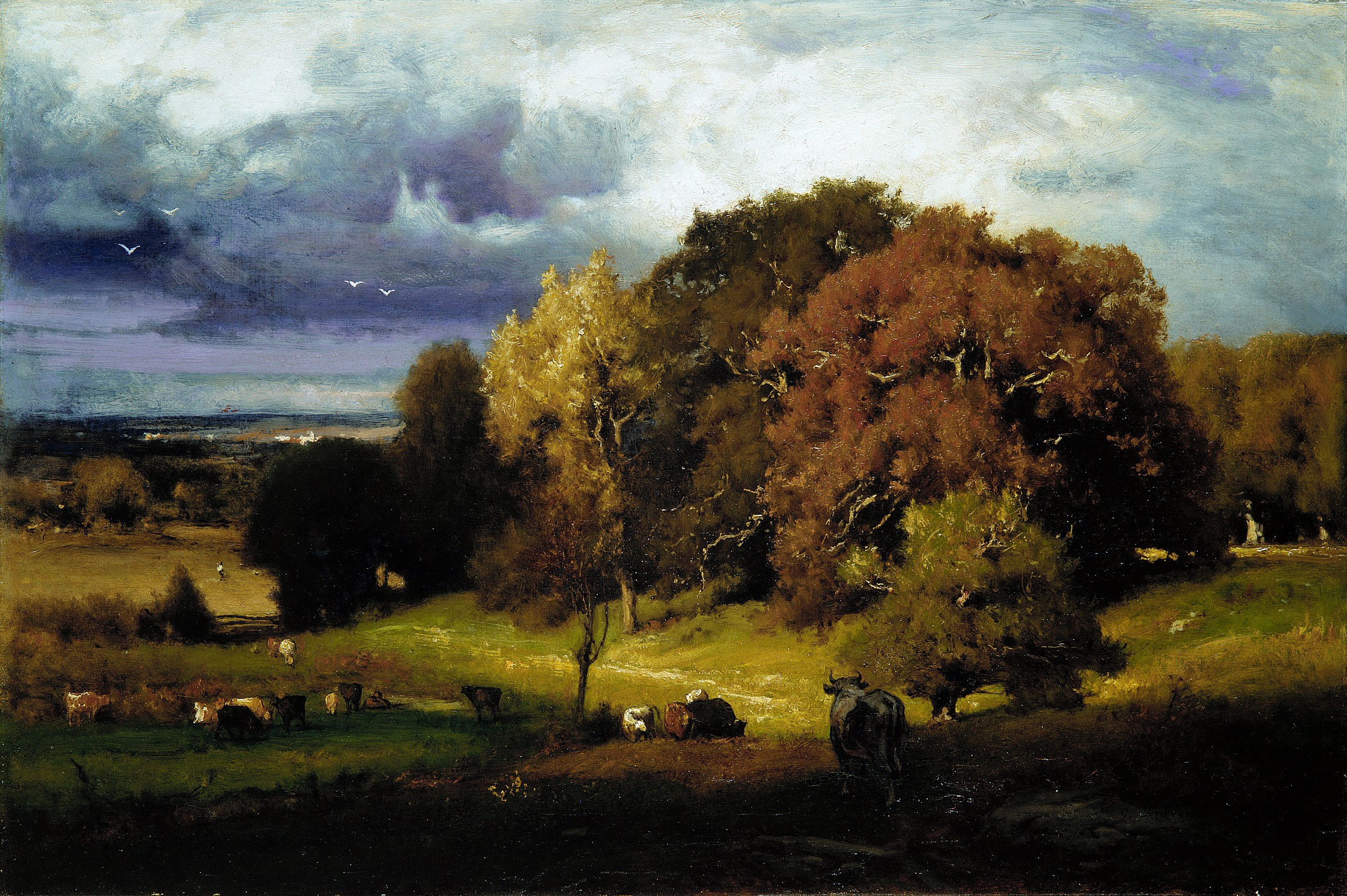
- Artist: George Inness
- Year: c. 1878
- Medium: Oil on canvas
- Dimensions: 54.3 cm × 76.5 cm (21.4 in × 30.1 in)
- Location: Metropolitan Museum of Art; New York City
- Accession: 87.8.8

Autumn Oaks is a late 19th-century painting by American artist George Inness. Done in oil on canvas, the painting depicts a grove of oak trees in the American countryside. Inness painted Autumn Oaks almost immediately after his return from a four-year trip to Europe during which he painted many naturalistic works. As opposed to some of his earlier works, Inness painted Autumn Oaks with a richer palette, and more focus on lighting and color contrasts as opposed to detail.

Inness' painting was donated to the Metropolitan Museum of Art by George I. Seney in 1887, and remains in the Met's collection.
