= The Rainbow (painting) =

1878 painting by George Inness

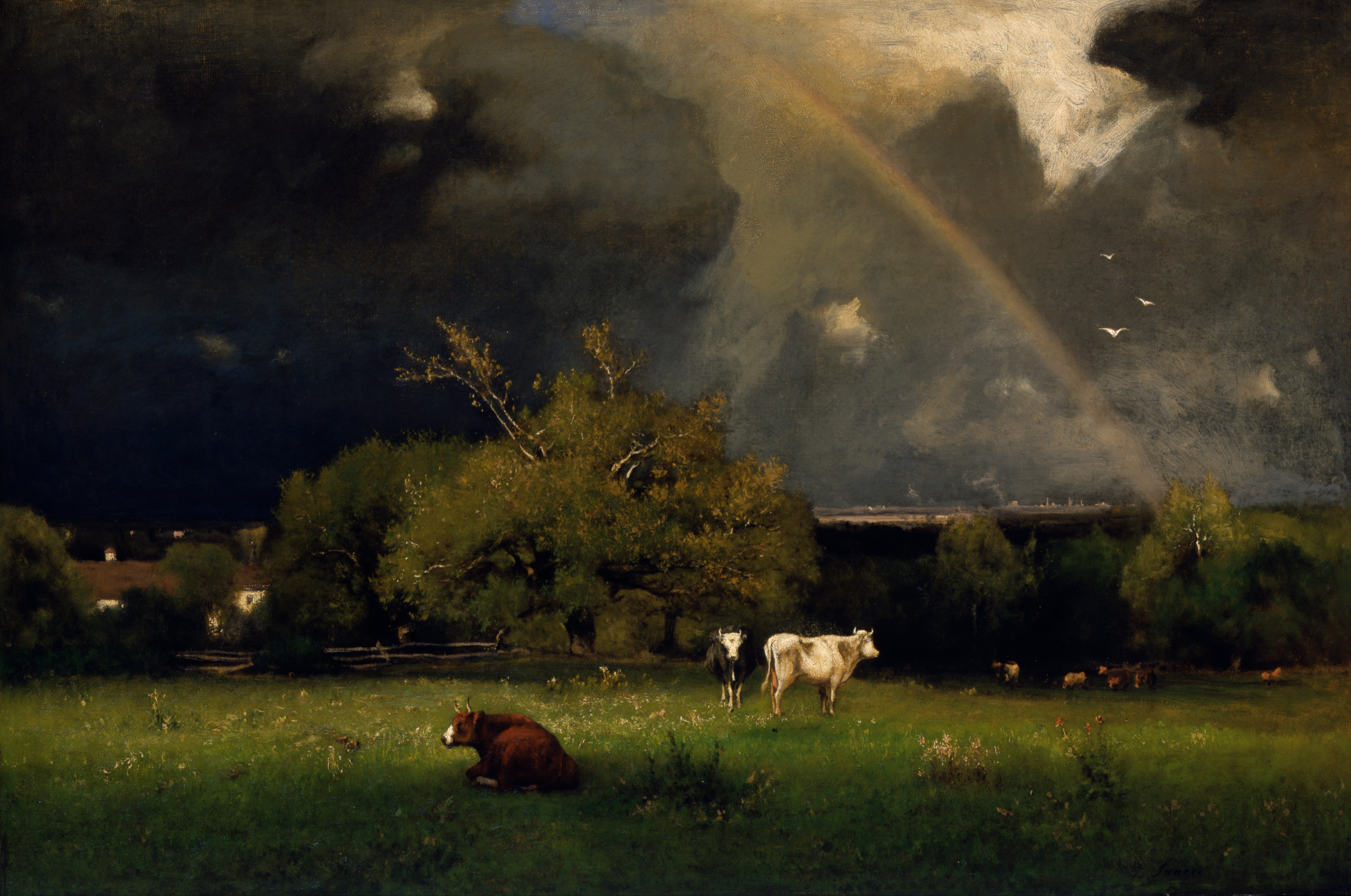
- Artist: George Inness
- Year: 1878–1879
- Type: Oil painting on canvas
- Dimensions: 76 cm × 110 cm (30 in × 45 in)
- Location: Indianapolis Museum of Art, Indianapolis

The Rainbow is an 1878 oil painting by American artist George Inness, located in the Indianapolis Museum of Art, which is in Indianapolis, Indiana. It depicts a rainbow arcing across the sky after a storm.

== Description ==
In The Rainbow, Inness rearranged nature to imbue it with a sense of divine presence. He created stark atmospheric contrast moving from the storm on the left to the happy harbinger of the rainbow on the right. At the same time, the bucolic pasture in the foreground is juxtaposed against an unnamed city in the background. These contrasts fill the image with a heightened emotional charge. Starting in 1875, Inness began to include a strip of grey along the horizon that blurred the convergence of sky and plain. He used that trick here, and would continue to use it into the 1880s, although the blending of earth and sky failed to unify the halves of the composition.

== Historical information ==
Inness created a series of dramatic storm scenes in the late 1870s. He drew on a number of sources to shape and inform this series, including the Hudson River School and the mystic Emanuel Swedenborg. Swedenborg believed that there was a correspondence between objects in the physical realm and the parallel world of the spirit, while the artists of the Hudson River School believed the landscape represented God. Thus, a landscape painting could bring viewers closer to righteousness. Inness devoted himself to landscape painting, capturing the divinity he saw in nature. He often painted rainbows because, for Inness, they epitomized spirituality.

=== Acquisition ===
The IMA acquired The Rainbow in 1944, a gift from George E. Hume to the Herron School of Art. It currently hangs in the Paine Early American Painting Gallery and has the accession number 44.137.

== See also ==
- The Oxbow
