= Evening at Medfield, Massachusetts =

1875 painting by George Inness

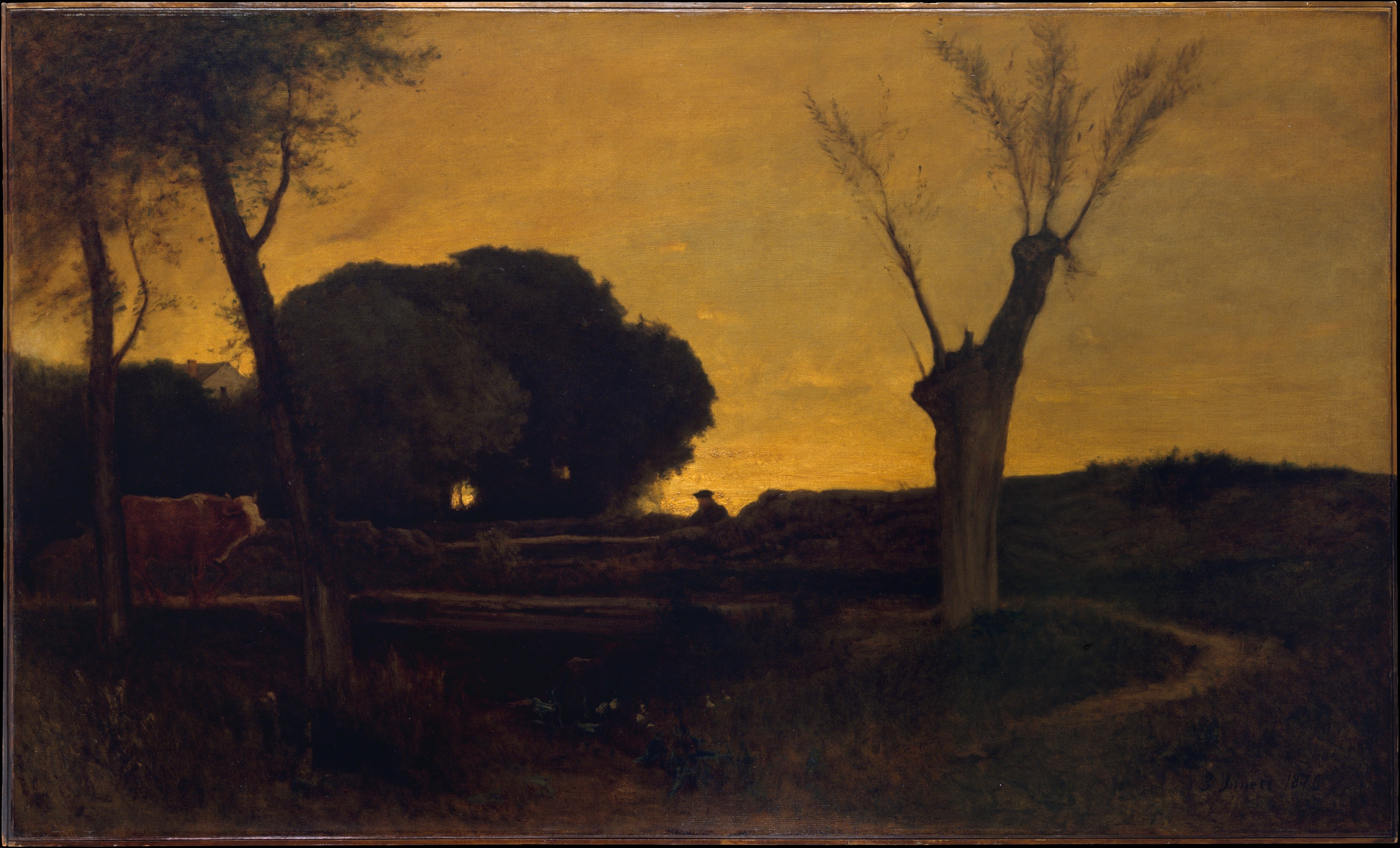
- Artist: George Inness
- Year: 1875
- Medium: Oil on canvas
- Dimensions: 96.5 cm × 160.3 cm (38.0 in × 63.1 in)
- Location: Metropolitan Museum of Art; New York City
- Accession: 10.64.6

Evening at Medfield, Massachusetts is a mid 19th-century painting by American artist George Inness. Done in oil on canvas, the painting depicts evening falling in the countryside near Medfield, Massachusetts. The painting is in the collection of the Metropolitan Museum of Art.

== Description ==
Inness painting Evening in 1875 after returning from a years-long trip to Italy and France. His European travels inspired him to paint more naturalistic works in the style of the Barbizon school - a contrast to Inness' earlier works painted in the more romantic style of the Hudson river school. This shift can be seen in the more manipulated, organized style of Evening in which Inness arranged painting elements in horizontal bands. Inness' work also makes effective use of silhouettes cast by the setting sun.

The painting was done on pure white canvas, with Inness intentionally allowing for the texture of the material to be visible underneath the paint. The artist also painted the sky and foreground using different amounts of paint, with the former being lightly applied and the latter more solidly applied.

Evening was donated to the Met by George A. Hearn in 1910.
