= George Inness =

American landscape painter (1825–1894)

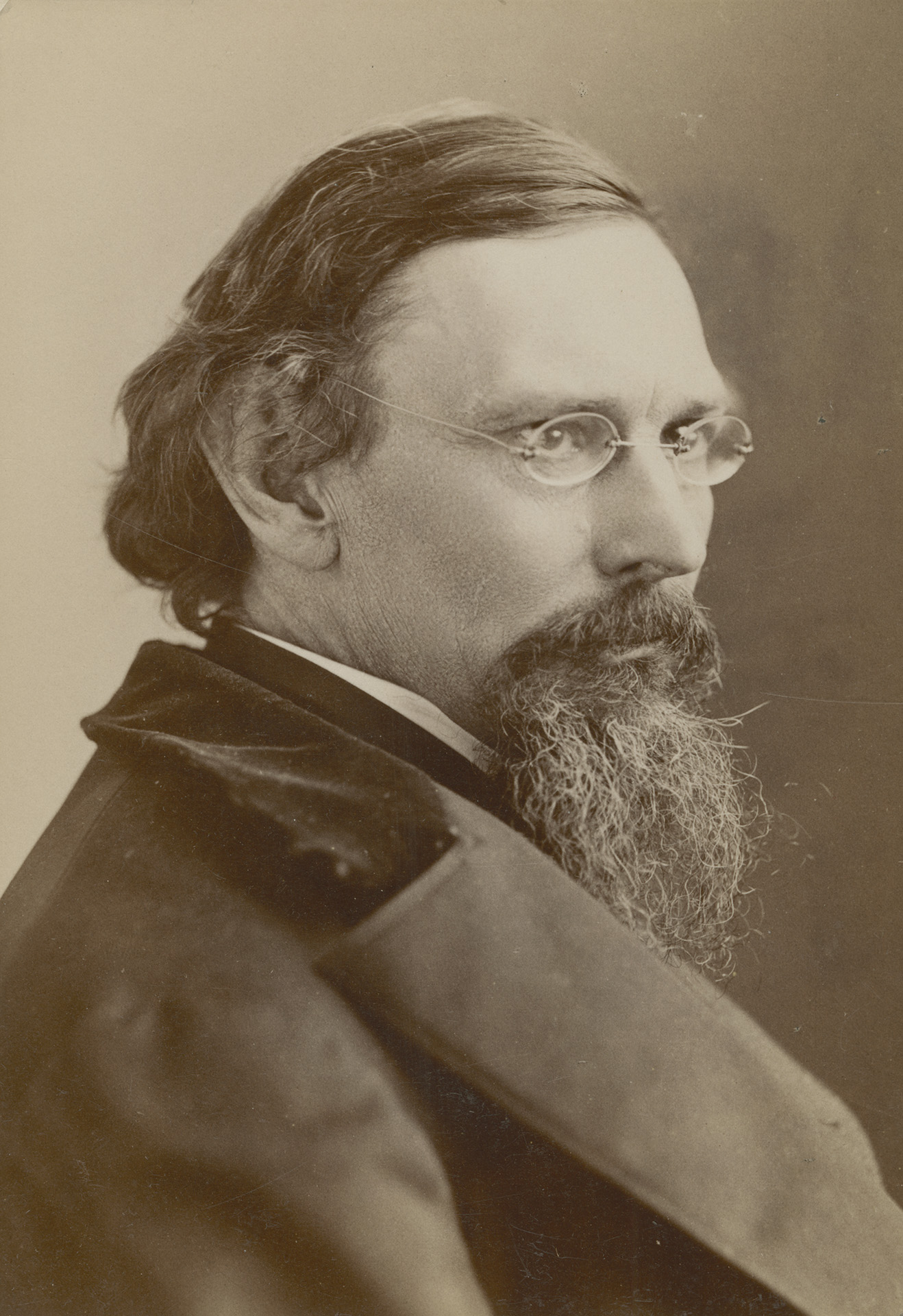
- Inness c. 1875
- Born: May 1, 1825; Newburgh, New York, U.S.
- Died: August 3, 1894 (aged 69); Bridge of Allan, Scotland
- Resting place: Rosedale Cemetery
- Education: Barbizon school of France
- Known for: Landscape art, Painting
- Movement: Hudson River School
- Spouse(s): Delia Miller; Elizabeth Abigail Hart
- Children: 6 (including George Inness Jr.)

George Inness (May 1, 1825 – August 3, 1894) was an American landscape painter.

Now recognized as one of the most influential American artists of the nineteenth century, Inness was influenced by the Hudson River School at the start of his career. He also studied the Old Masters, and artists of the Barbizon school during later trips to Europe. There he was introduced to the theology of Emanuel Swedenborg, which was significant for him; he expressed that spiritualism in the works of his maturity (1879–1894).

Although Inness's style evolved through distinct stages over a prolific career that spanned more than forty years and 1,000 paintings, his works consistently earned acclaim for their powerful, coordinated efforts to elicit depth of mood, atmosphere, and emotion. Neither pure realist nor impressionist, Inness was a transitional figure. He worked to combine both the earthly and the ethereal in order to capture the complete essence of a locale in his works. A master of light, color, and shadow, he became noted for creating highly ordered and complex scenes that often juxtaposed hazy or blurred elements with sharp and refined details to evoke an interweaving of both the physical and the spiritual nature of experience. In Inness's words, he attempted through his art to demonstrate the "reality of the unseen" and to connect the "visible upon the invisible."

Within his lifetime, art critics hailed Inness as one of America's greatest artists. Often called "the father of American landscape painting," Inness is best known for his mature works that not only exemplified the Tonalist movement but also displayed an original and uniquely American style.

== Youth ==
George Inness was born on May 1, 1825, in Newburgh, New York. He was the fifth of thirteen children born to John William Inness, a farmer, and his wife, Clarissa Baldwin.

His family moved to Newark, New Jersey when he was about five years of age. In 1839 he studied for several months with an itinerant painter, John Jesse Barker.

In his teens, Inness worked as a map engraver in New York City, first for Sherman & Smith, and then N. Currier. During this time he attracted the attention of French landscape painter Régis François Gignoux, with whom he subsequently studied. Throughout the mid-1840s he also attended classes at the National Academy of Design, and studied the work of Hudson River School artists Thomas Cole and Asher Durand; "If," Inness later recalled thinking, "these two can be combined, I will try." He debuted his work at the National Academy in 1844.

Inness opened his first studio in New York in 1848. In 1849, he married Delia Miller, who died a few months later. The next year he married Elizabeth Abigail Hart, with whom he would have six children.

== Early career ==
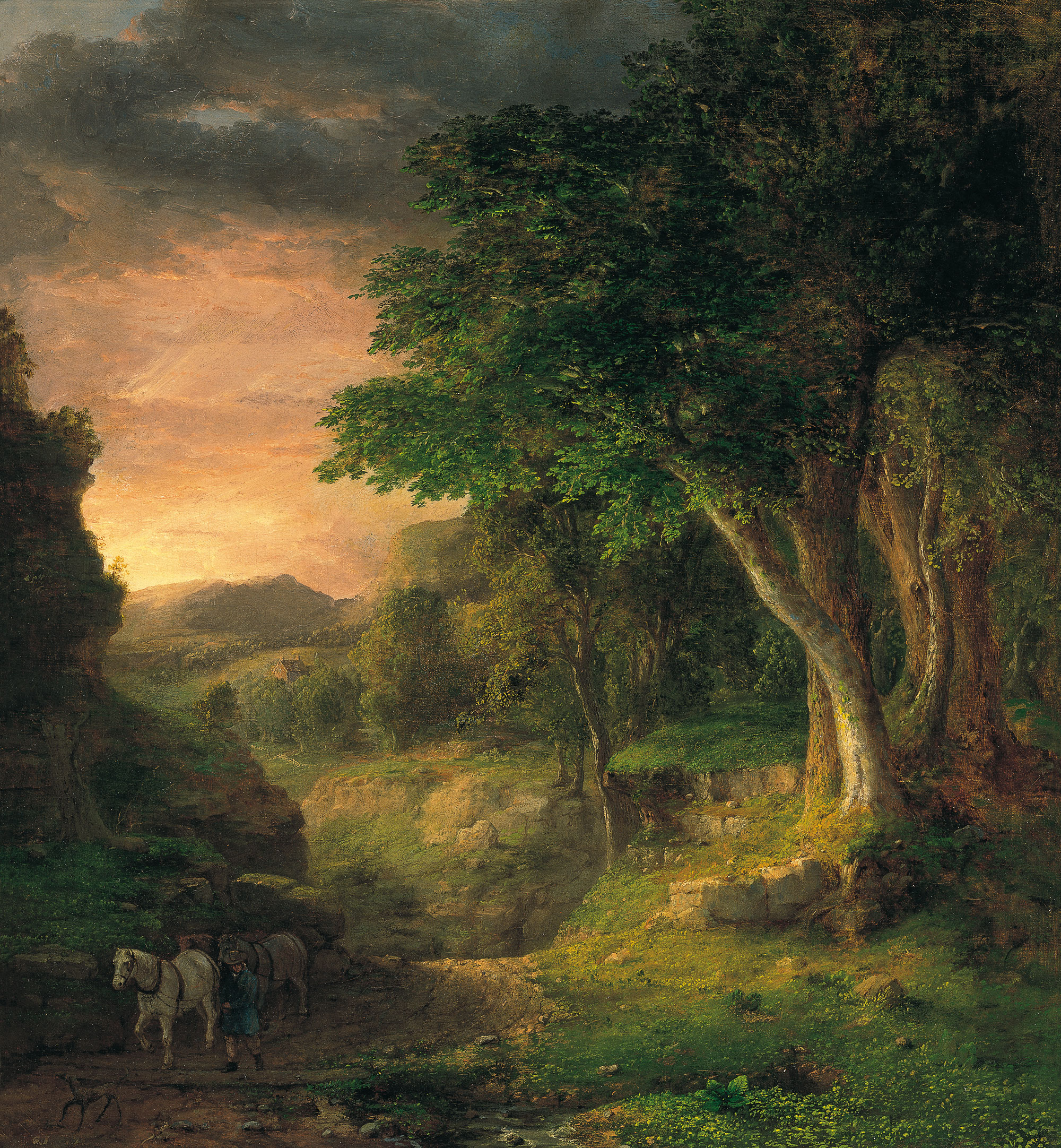
In the Berkshires, 1850

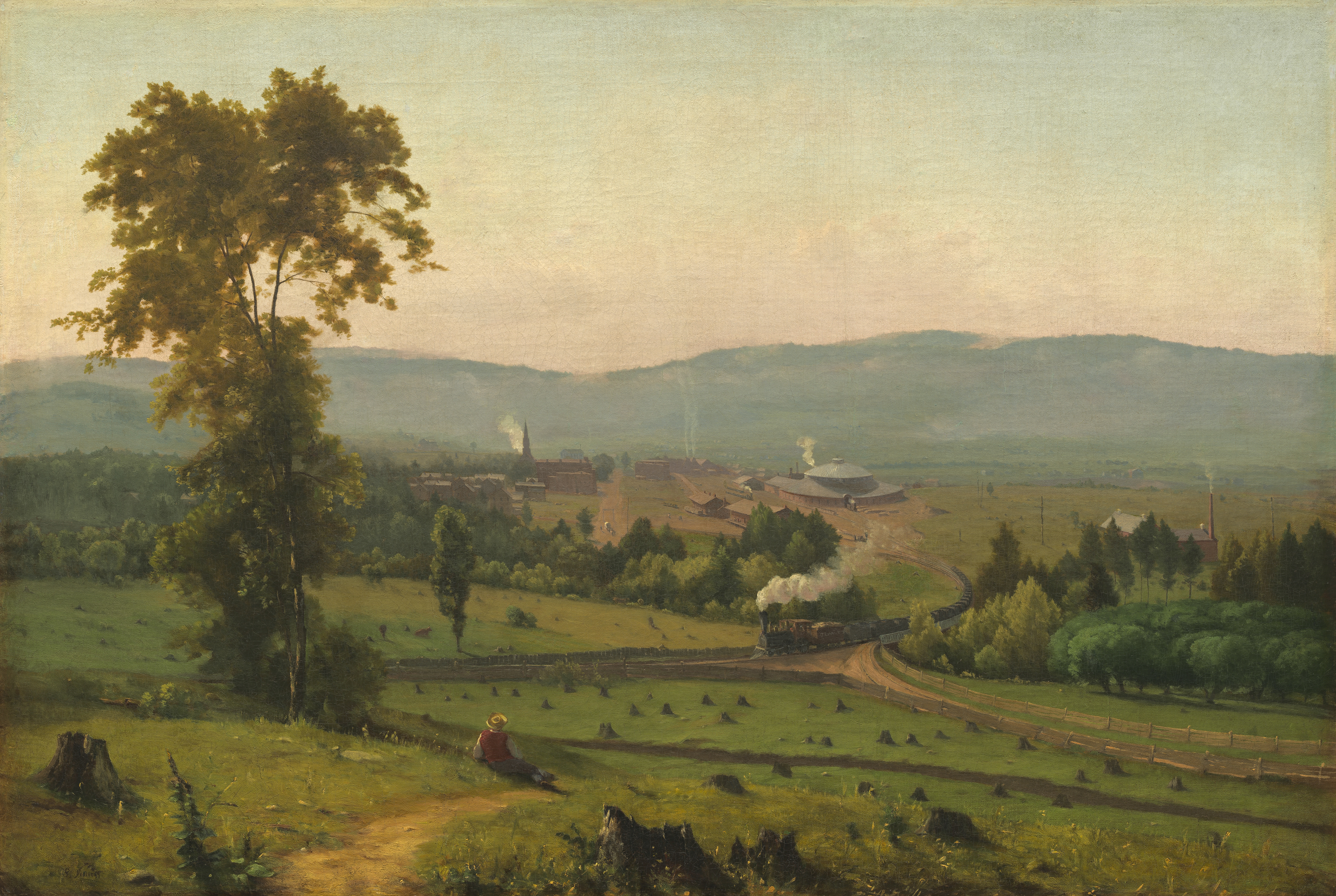
The Lackawanna Valley, c. 1856, National Gallery of Art

In 1851 a patron named Ogden Haggerty sponsored Inness's first trip to Europe to paint and study. Inness spent fifteen months in Rome, where he studied landscapes by French artists Claude Lorrain and Nicolas Poussin. He rented a studio there above that of painter William Page, who likely introduced the artist to Swedenborgianism. He returned to America with his wife on the SS Great Britain in May 1852. In 1853 he was elected to the National Academy of Design as an Associate member and became a full Academician in 1868.

During trips to Paris in the early 1850s, Inness came under the influence of artists working in the Barbizon school of France. Barbizon landscapes were noted for their looser brushwork, darker palette, and emphasis on mood. Inness quickly became the leading American exponent of Barbizon-style painting, which he developed into a highly personal style. In 1854 during one of these trips, his son George Inness, Jr., who also became a landscape painter of note, was born in Paris.

In the mid-1850s, Inness was commissioned by the Delaware, Lackawanna and Western Railroad to create paintings which documented the progress of DLWRR's growth in early Industrial America. The Lackawanna Valley, painted c. 1855, represents the railroad's first roundhouse at Scranton, Pennsylvania. It integrates technology and wilderness within an observed landscape; in time, not only would Inness shun the industrial presence in favor of bucolic or agrarian subjects, but he would produce much of his mature work in the studio, drawing on his visual memory to produce scenes that were often inspired by specific places. But the artist was increasingly concerned with formal considerations.

== Mid-career ==
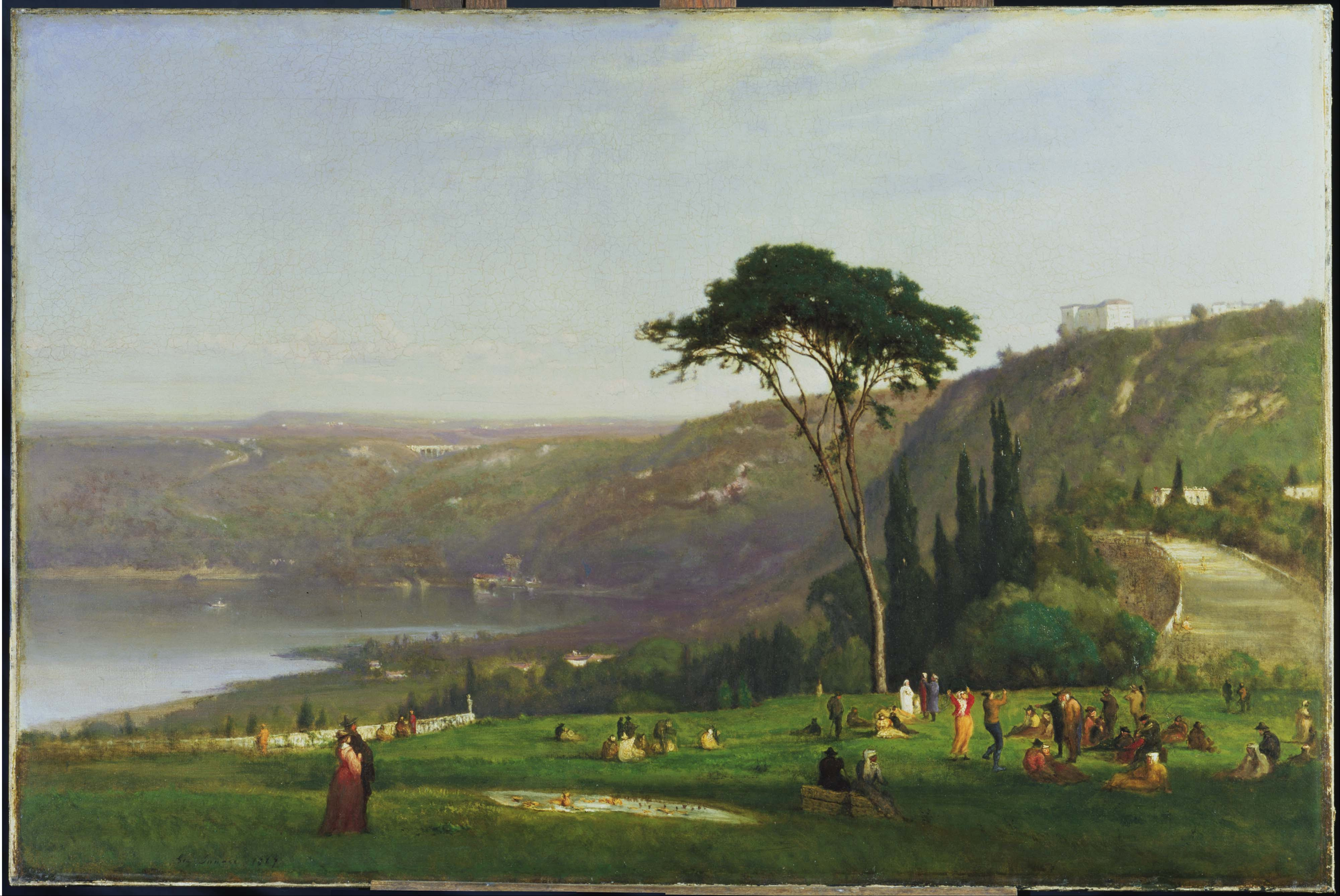
Lake Albano, 1869, Phillips Collection

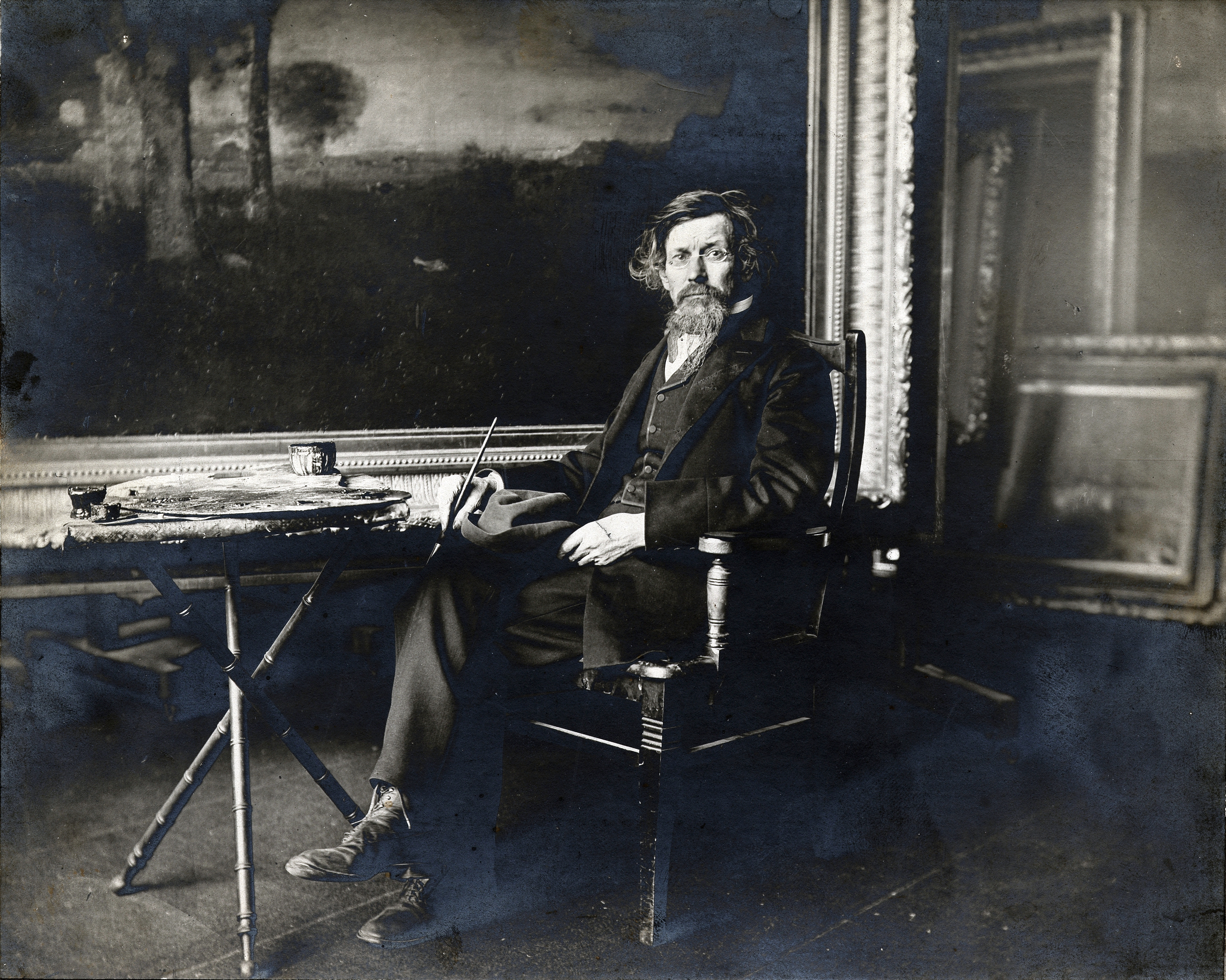
Inness in his studio, 1890

Inness moved from New York City to Medfield, Massachusetts in 1860, where he converted a barn into a studio. In 1862–63, he was an art teacher to Charles Dormon Robinson, who became known for works of California.

Inness moved to Perth Amboy, New Jersey in 1864. (See George Inness House.) He returned to Europe in the spring of 1870, living in Rome and touring Tivoli, Lake Albano, and Venice. In 1878, he returned to New York City, taking a studio in the New York University Building. The same year, he also participated in the Universal Exposition in Paris. In addition to painting, he published art criticism in the New York Evening Post and Harper's New Monthly Magazine.

His work of the 1860s and 1870s often tended toward the panoramic and picturesque, topped by cloud-laden and threatening skies. It included views of his native country (Autumn Oaks, 1878, Metropolitan Museum of Art; Catskill Mountains, 1870, Art Institute of Chicago), as well as scenes inspired by numerous travels overseas, especially to Italy and France (The Monk, 1873, Addison Gallery of American Art; Etretat, 1875, Wadsworth Atheneum). In terms of composition, precision of drawing, and the emotive use of color, these paintings placed Inness among the best and most successful landscape painters in America.

In 1877 Inness built a home and studio at Tarpon Springs, Florida. He ignored the characteristic palm and painted what some considered the drab pine woods. His painting Early Morning – Tarpon Springs depicts this environment.

Eventually Inness's art expressed the influence of the theology of Emanuel Swedenborg. Of particular interest to Inness was the notion that everything in nature had a corresponding relationship with something spiritual and so received an "influx" from God in order to continually exist. Another influence upon Inness's thinking was William James, also an adherent of Swedenborgianism. In particular, Inness was inspired by James's idea of consciousness as a "stream of thought", as well as his ideas concerning how mystical experience shapes one's perspective toward nature.

Inness was the subject of a major retrospective in 1884, organized by the American Art Association, which brought him acclaim in the United States. He earned international fame when he received a gold medal at the 1889 Paris Exposition.

== Late career ==
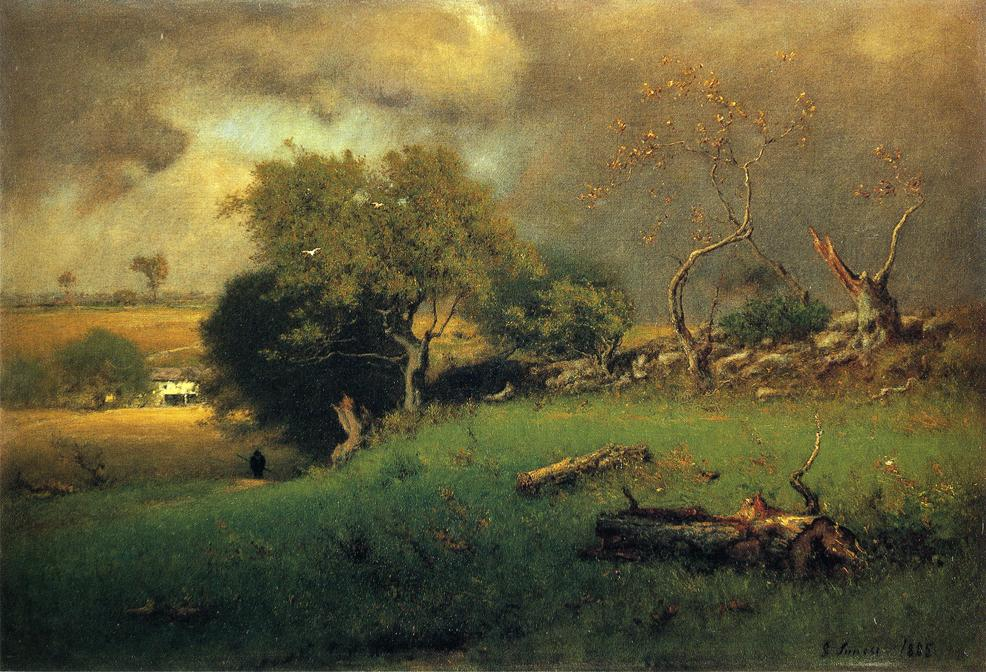
The Storm, oil on canvas, 1885, Reynolda House Museum of American Art

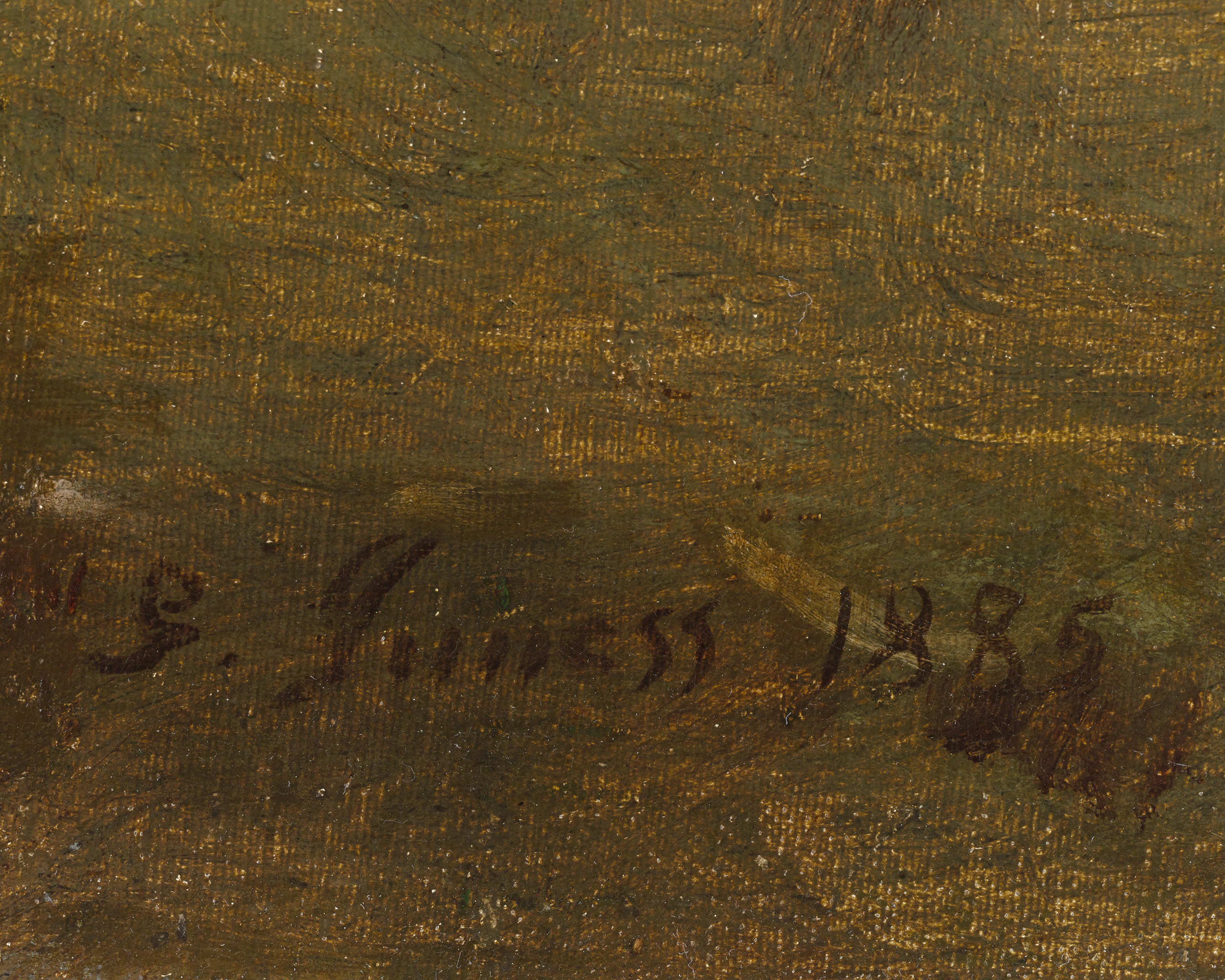
George Inness signature from 1885

After Inness settled in Montclair, New Jersey in 1885, and particularly in the last decade of his life, he expressed this mystical component by a more abstracted handling of shapes, softened edges, and saturated color (October, 1886, Los Angeles County Museum of Art), a profound and dramatic juxtaposition of sky and earth (Early Autumn, Montclair, 1888, Montclair Art Museum), an emphasis on the intimate landscape view (Sunset in the Woods, 1891, Corcoran Gallery of Art), and an increasingly personal, spontaneous, and often violent handling of paint. It is this last quality in particular which distinguishes Inness from those painters of like sympathies who are characterized as Luminists.

In a published interview, Inness maintained that "The true use of art is, first, to cultivate the artist's own spiritual nature." His abiding interest in spiritual and emotional considerations did not preclude Inness from undertaking a scientific study of color, nor a mathematical, structural approach to composition: "The poetic quality is not obtained by eschewing any truths of fact or of Nature...Poetry is the vision of reality."

Inness died on August 3, 1894 at Bridge of Allan in Scotland. According to his son, he was viewing the sunset, when he threw up his hands into the air and exclaimed, "My God! oh, how beautiful!", fell to the ground, and died minutes later. A public funeral for Inness was held at the National Academy of Design. A memorial exhibition was conducted at the Fine Arts Building in New York City.

He is buried in Montclair, New Jersey's Rosedale Cemetery, as is his namesake son. The Montclair Art Museum is the only museum in the world that has a gallery dedicated to Inness and as of 2023 has a renowned collection of 24 works by Inness.

== Gallery ==
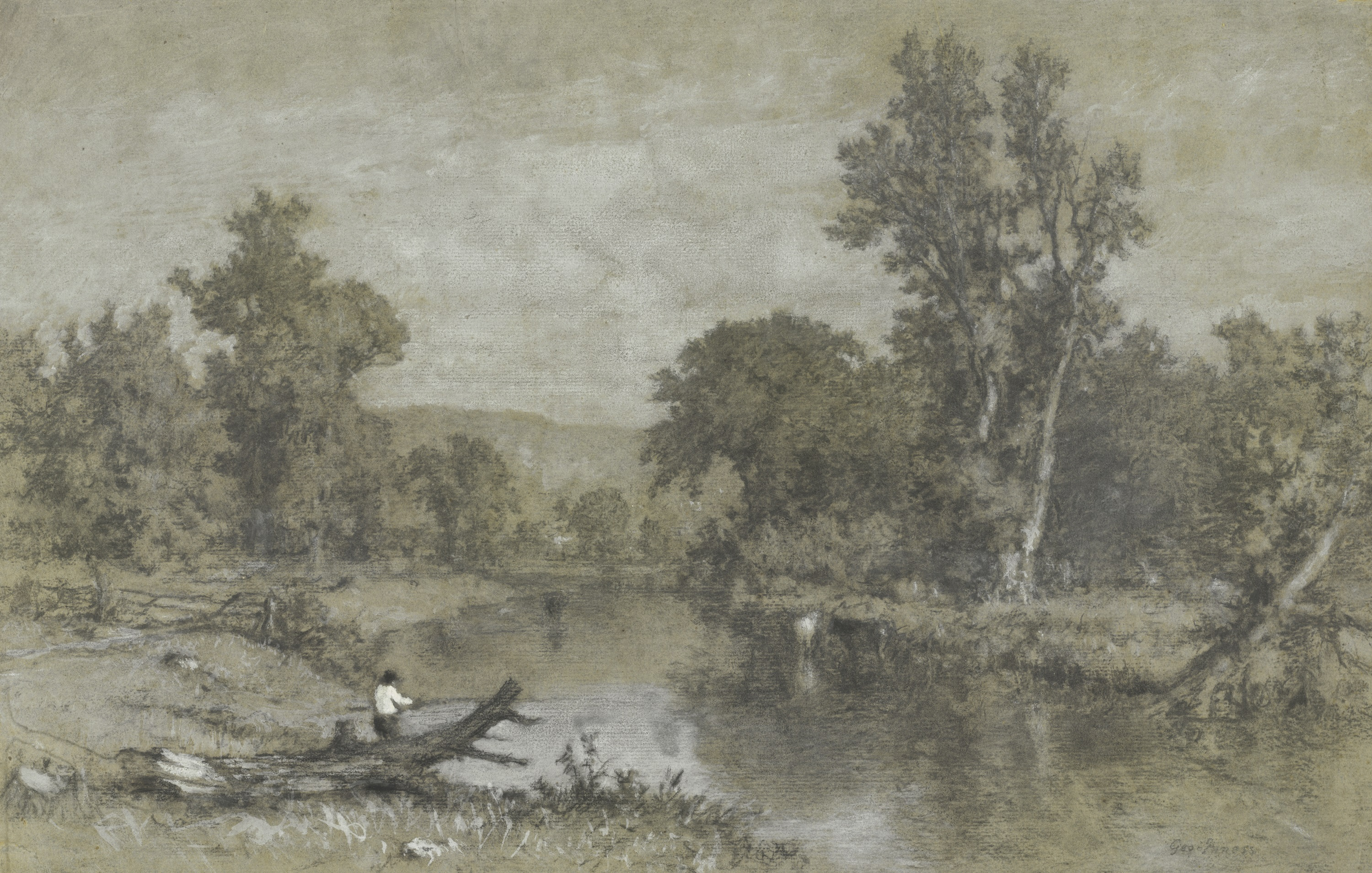
Milton, New York, charcoal, white wash, and gouache over graphite on grey paper, c. 1856, Yale University Art Gallery

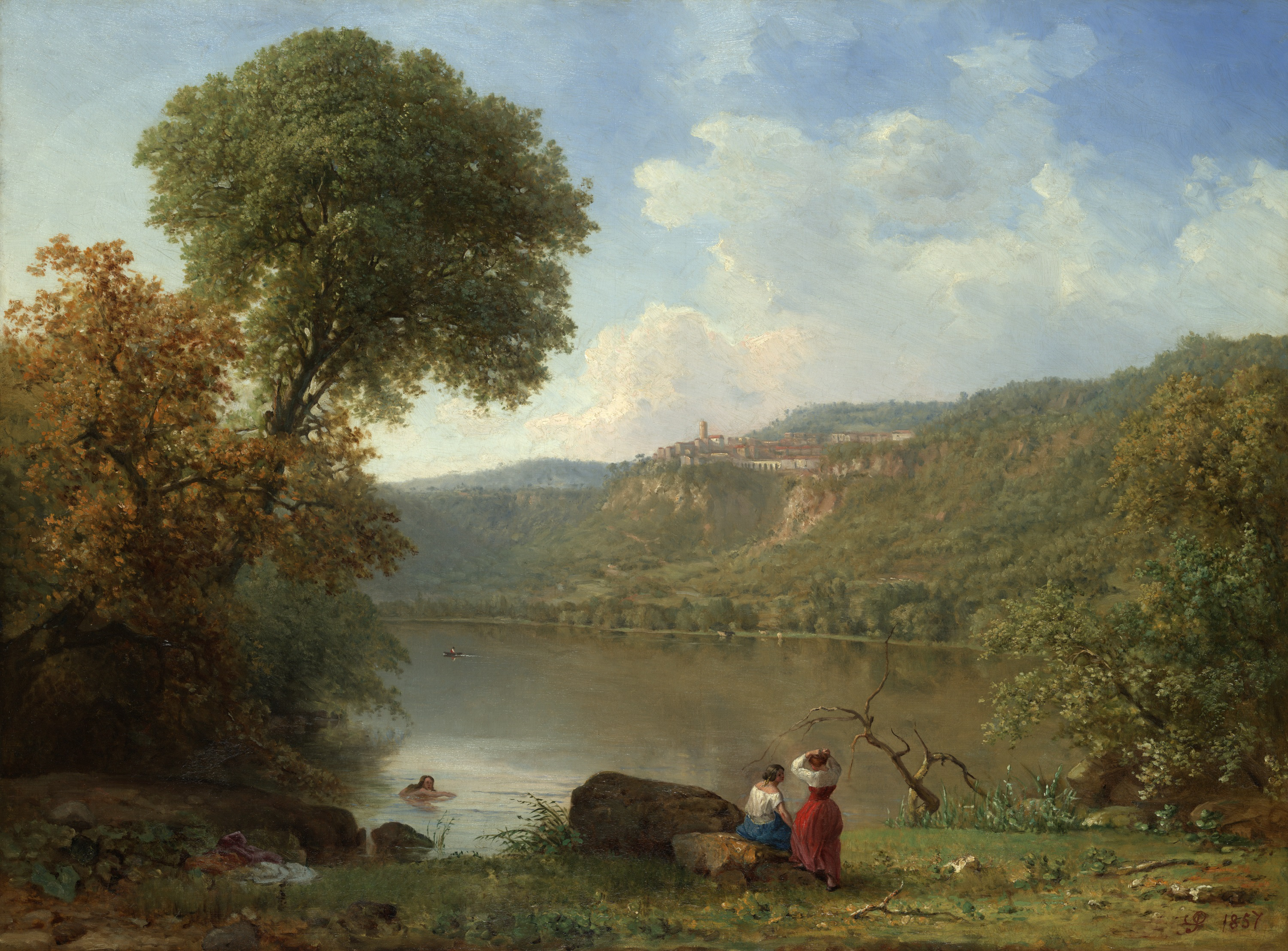
Lake Nemi, oil on canvas, 1857, Yale University Art Gallery

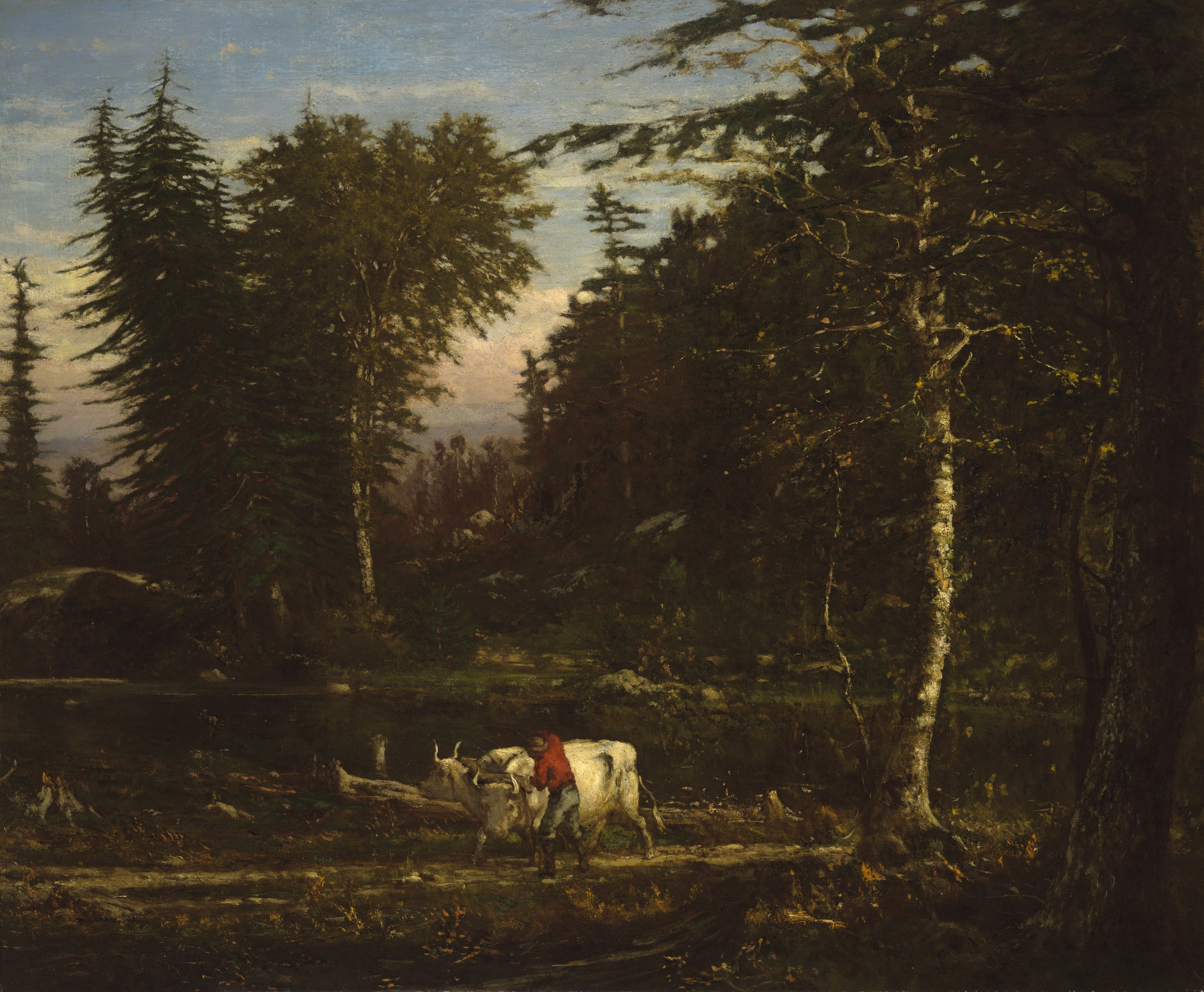
In the Adirondacks, oil on canvas, c. 1862, Yale University Art Gallery

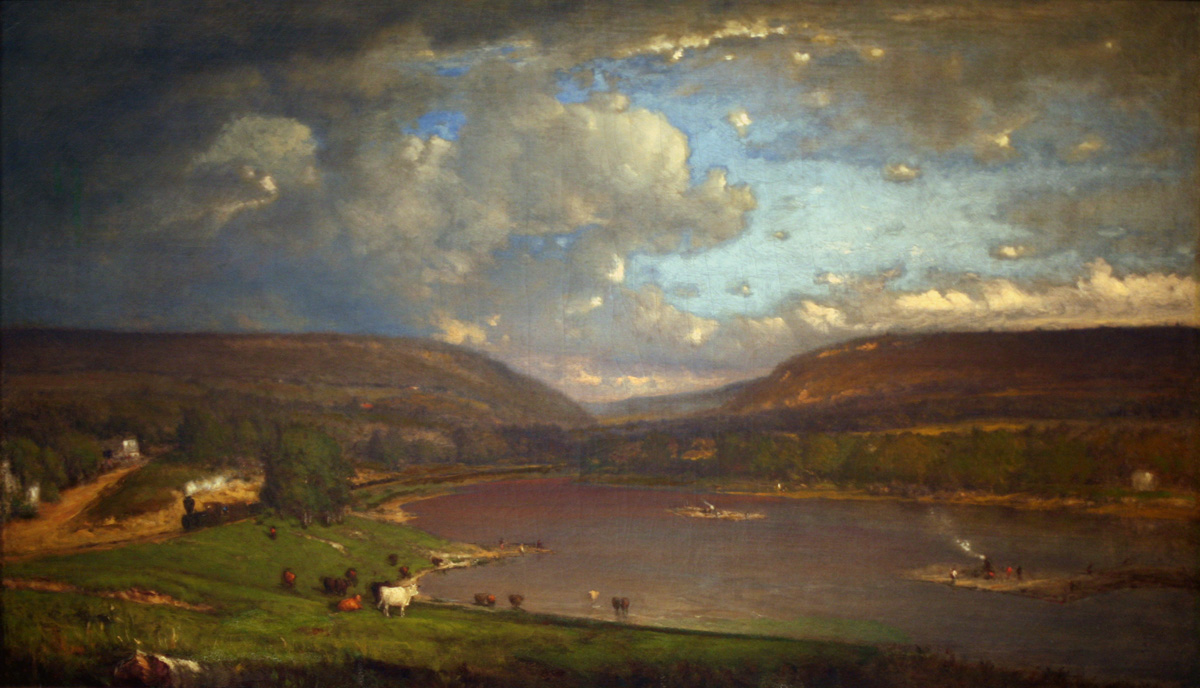
On the Delaware River, 1860s, Brooklyn Museum

The Valley of the Olives, oil on canvas, 1867, The Walters Art Museum

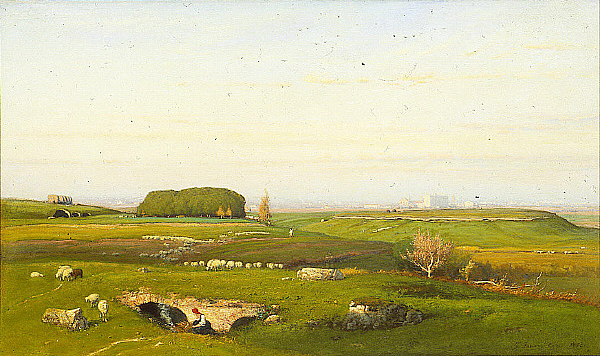
In the Roman Campagna, oil on canvas, 1873, Saint Louis Art Museum

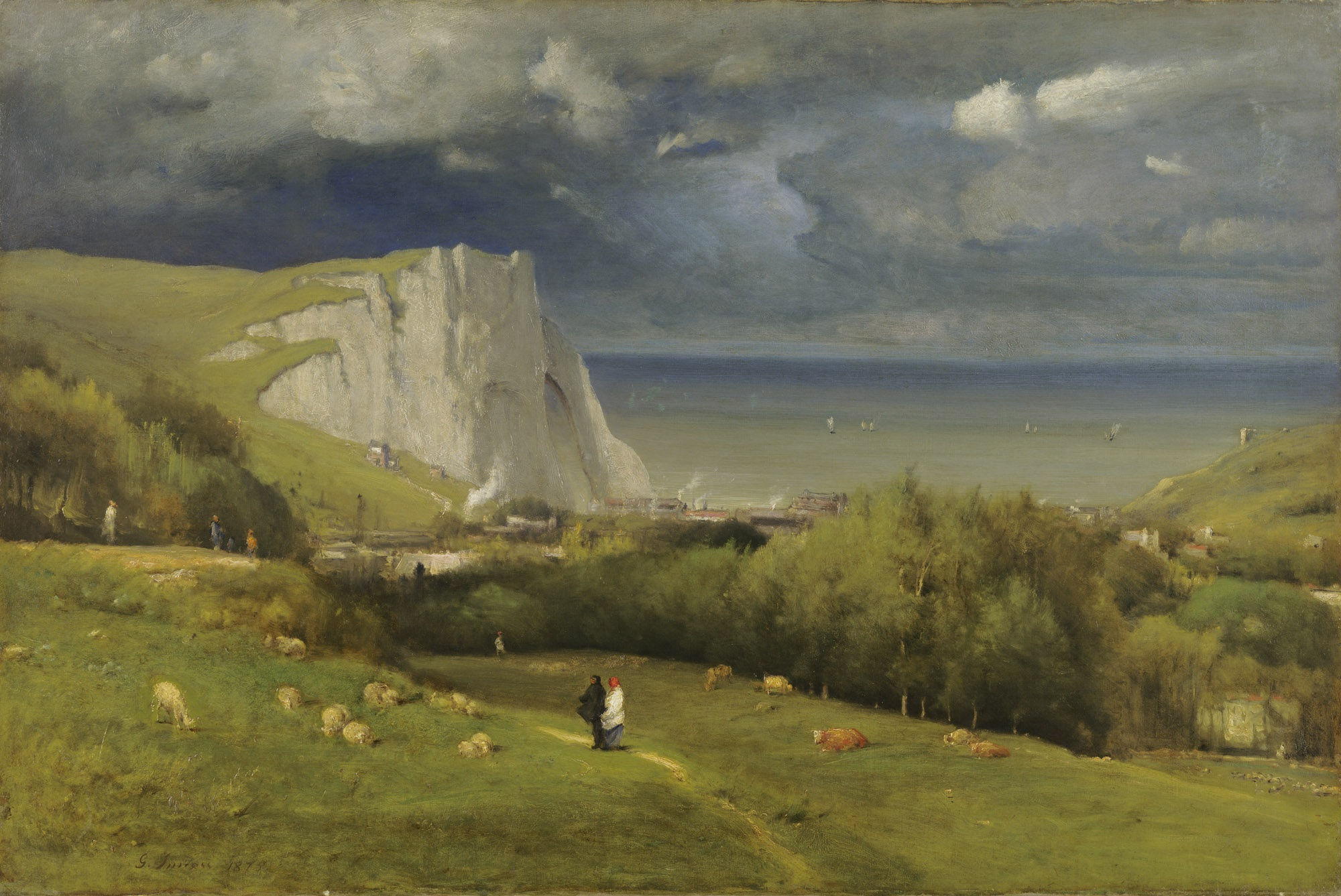
Étretat, oil on canvas, 1875, Wadsworth Atheneum

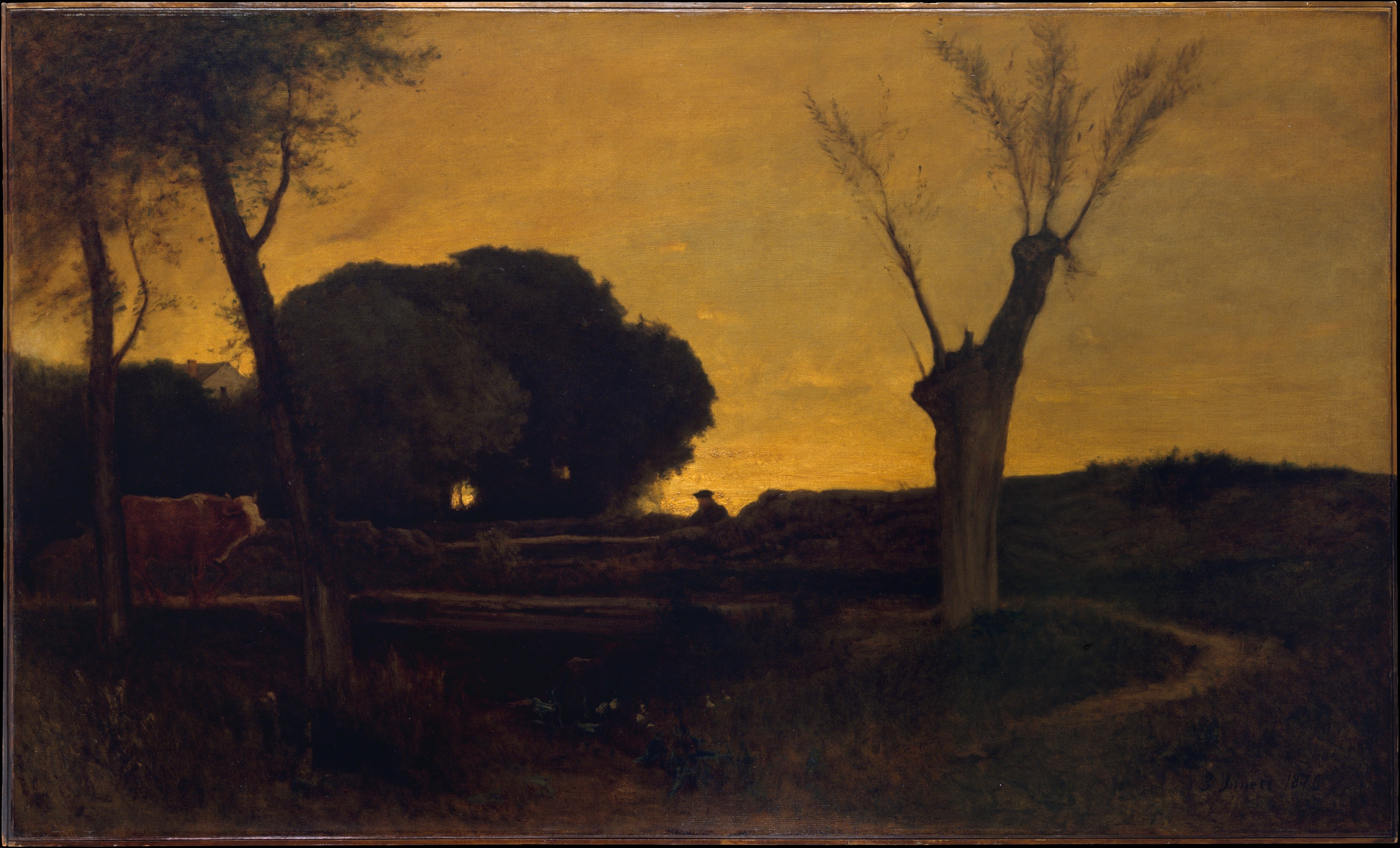
Evening at Medfield, Massachusetts, 1875, Metropolitan Museum of Art

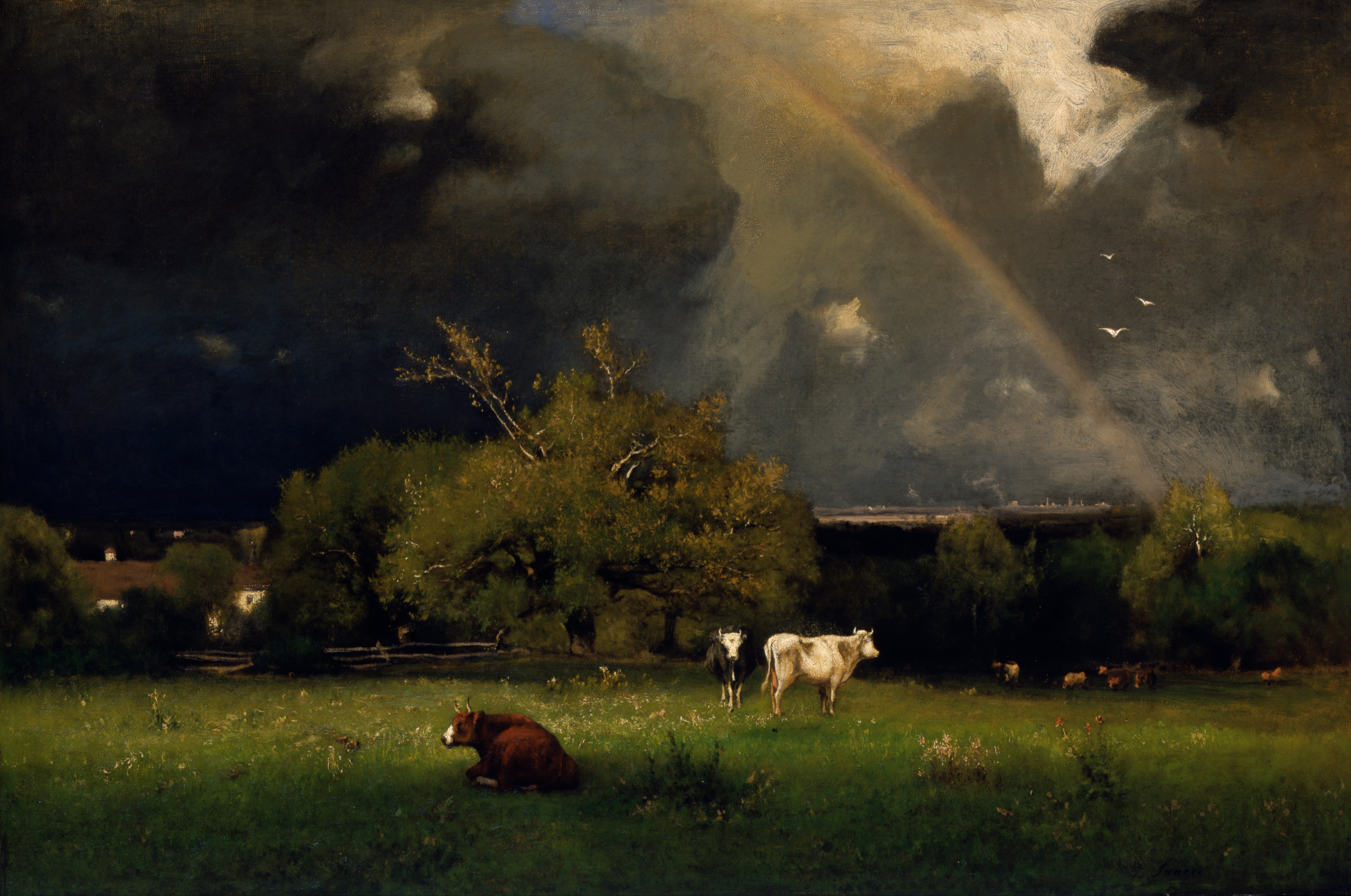
The Rainbow, oil on canvas c. 1878, Indianapolis Museum of Art

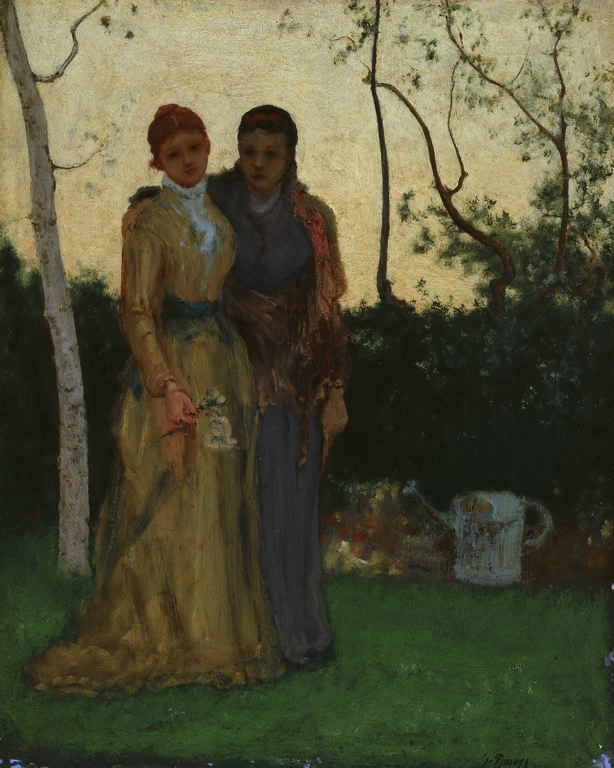
Two Sisters in the Garden, oil on millboard, 1882, Art Institute of Chicago

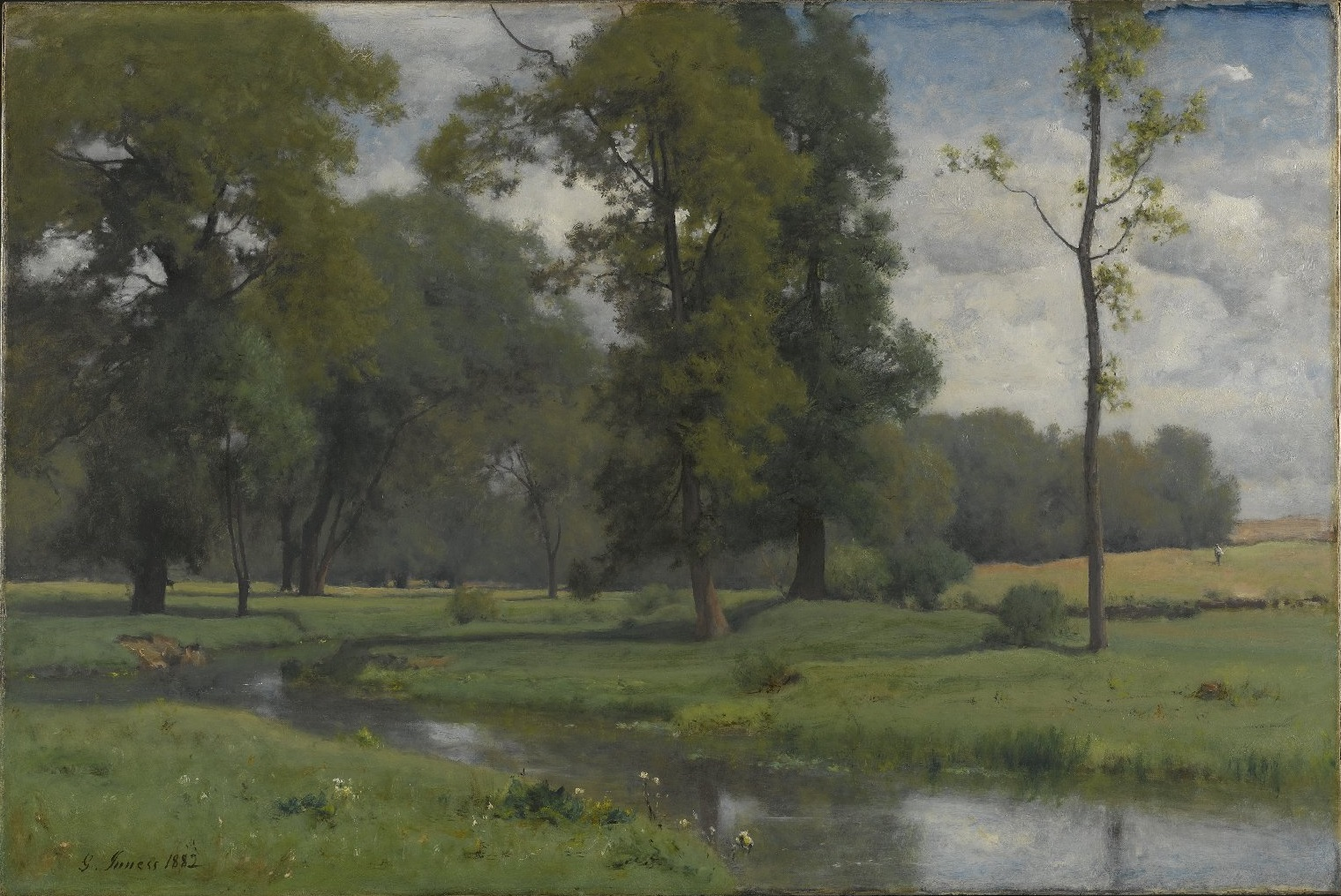
June, 1882, Brooklyn Museum

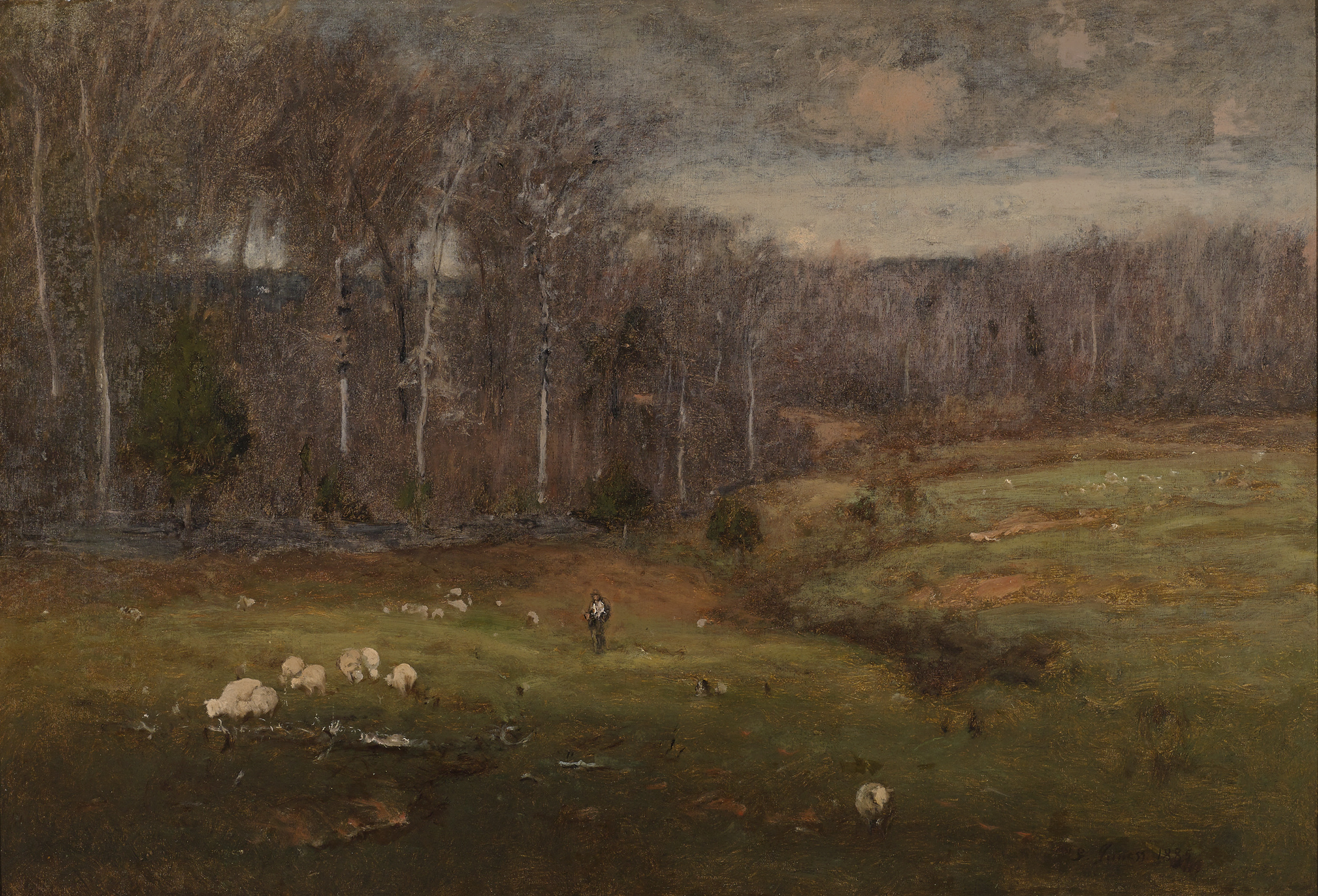
Frosty Morning, Montclair, oil on canvas, 1885

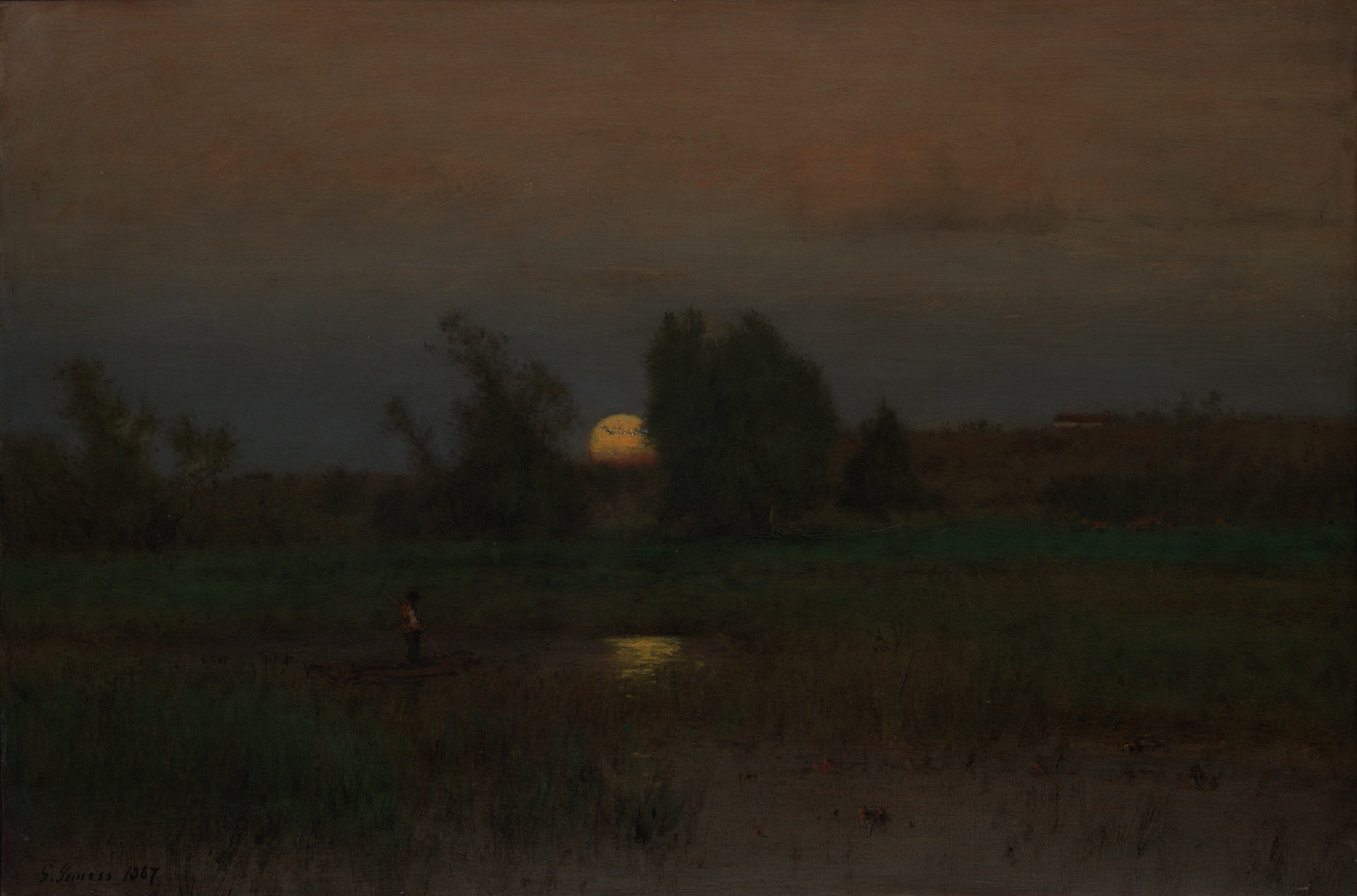
Moonrise, oil on canvas, 1887, Yale University Art Gallery

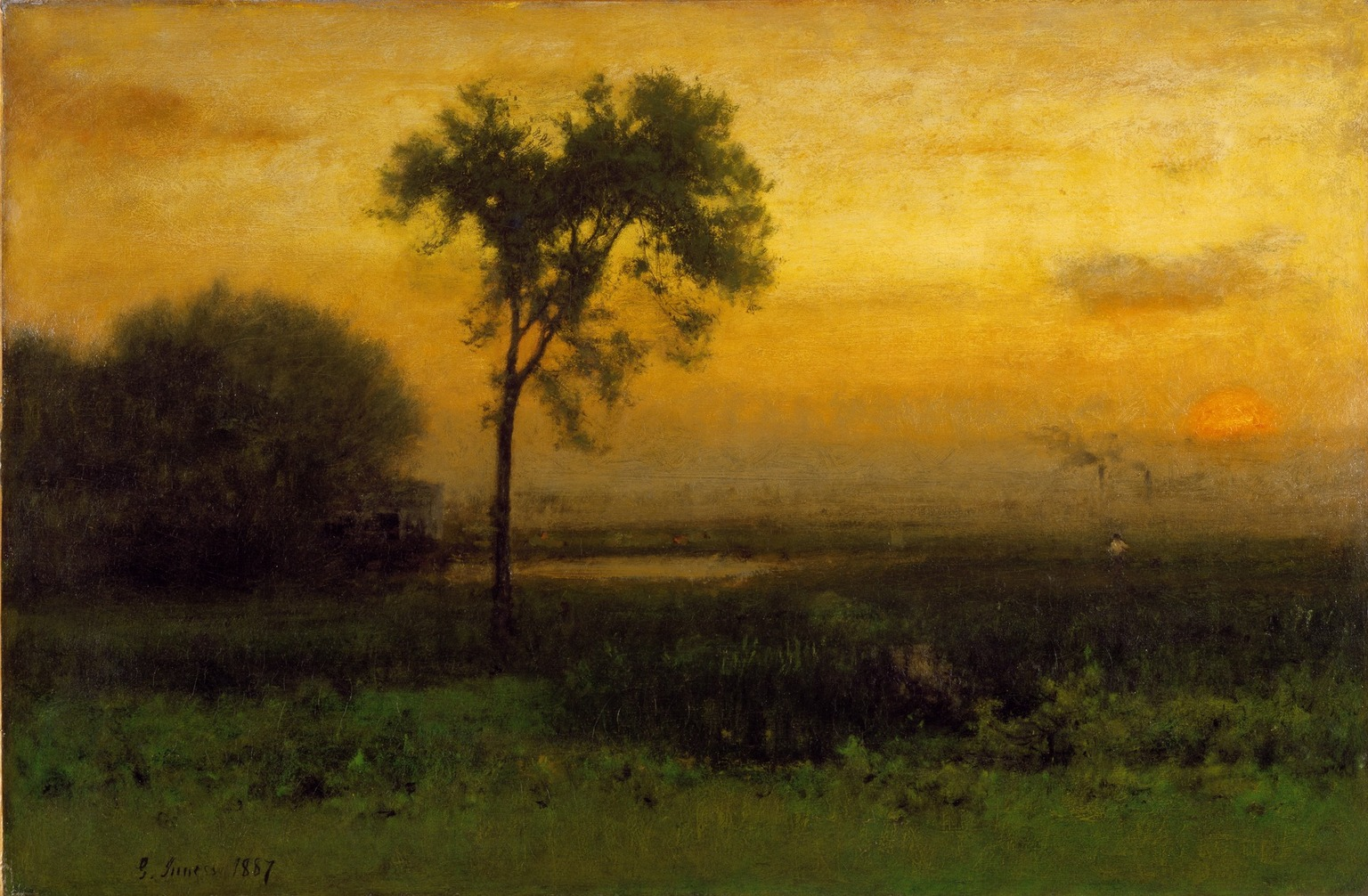
Sunrise, 1887, Brooklyn Museum

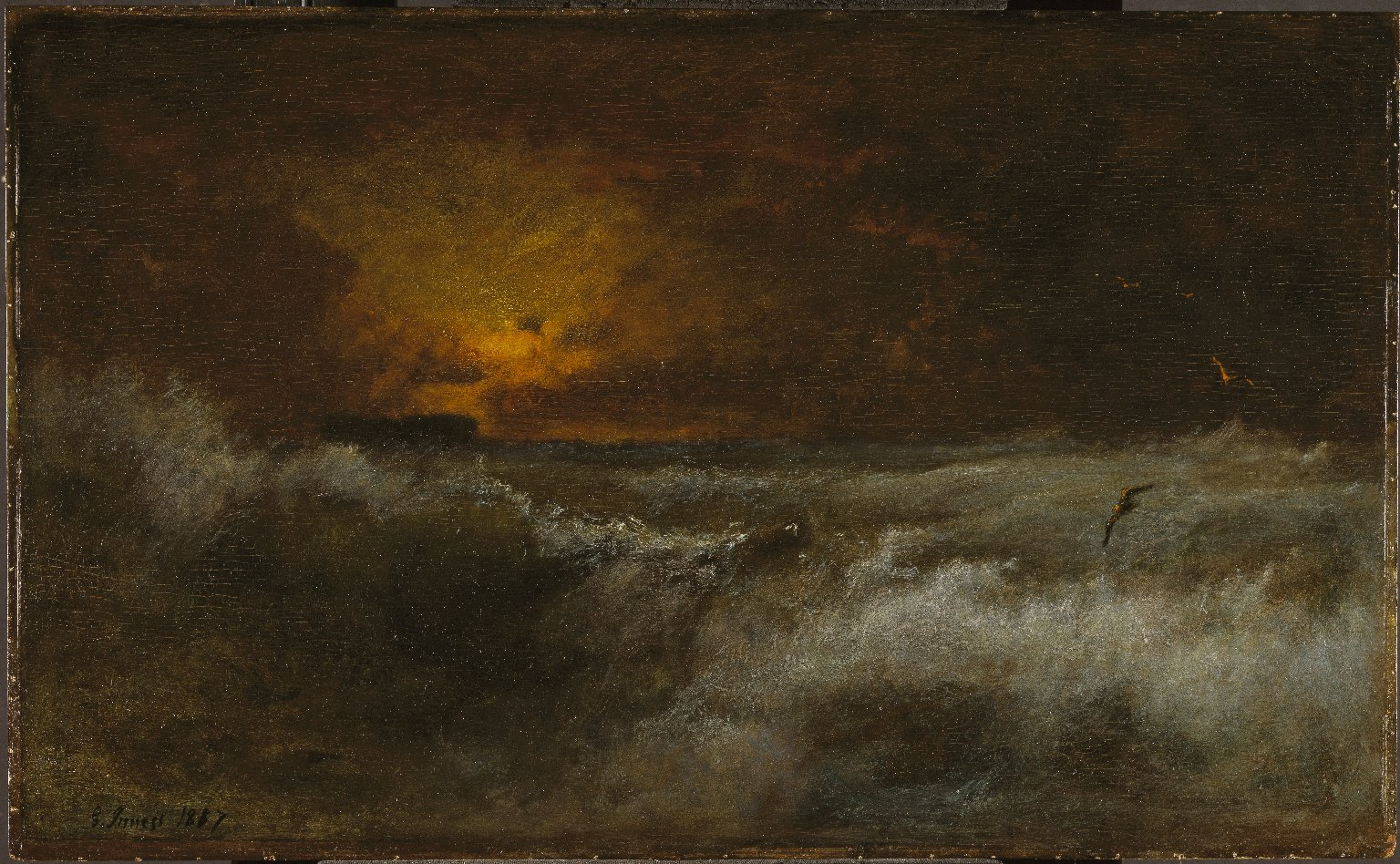
Sunset over the Sea, 1887, Brooklyn Museum

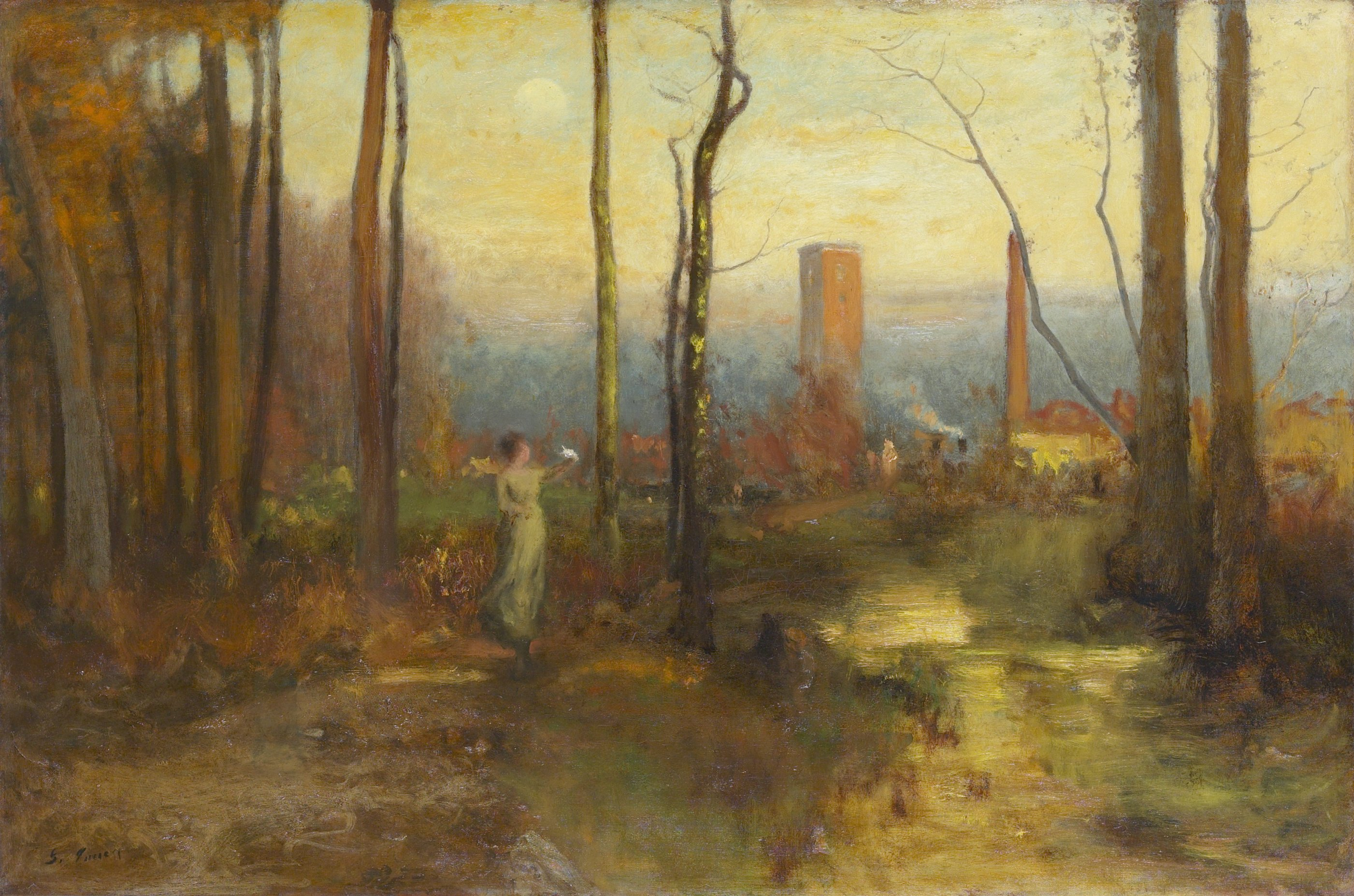
The Mill Stream, Montclair, New Jersey, c. 1888, Minneapolis Institute of Art

Sunset in Georgia, 1890, oil on canvas board, Milwaukee Art Museum

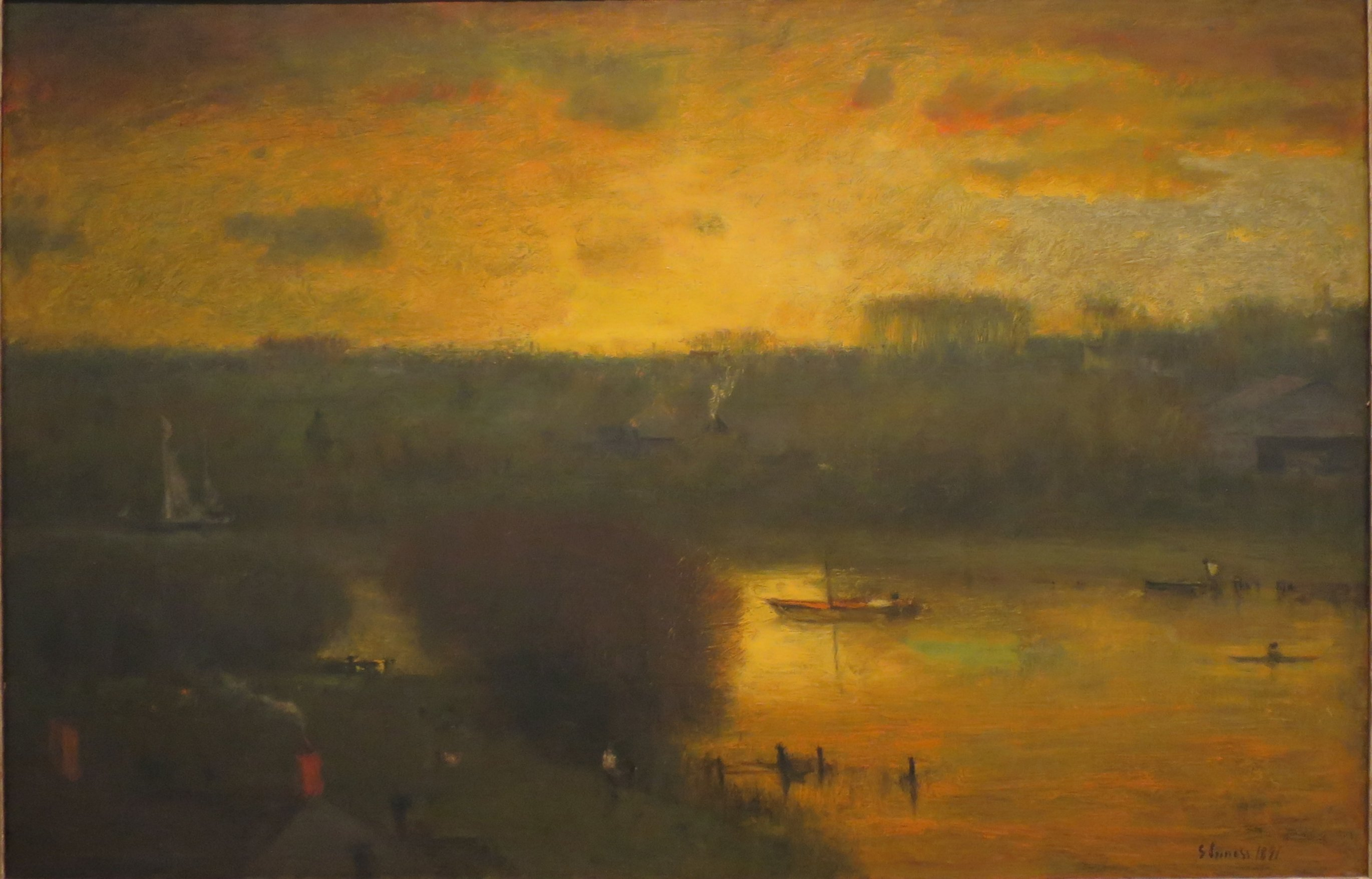
Sunset on the Passaic, oil on canvas, 1891, Honolulu Museum of Art

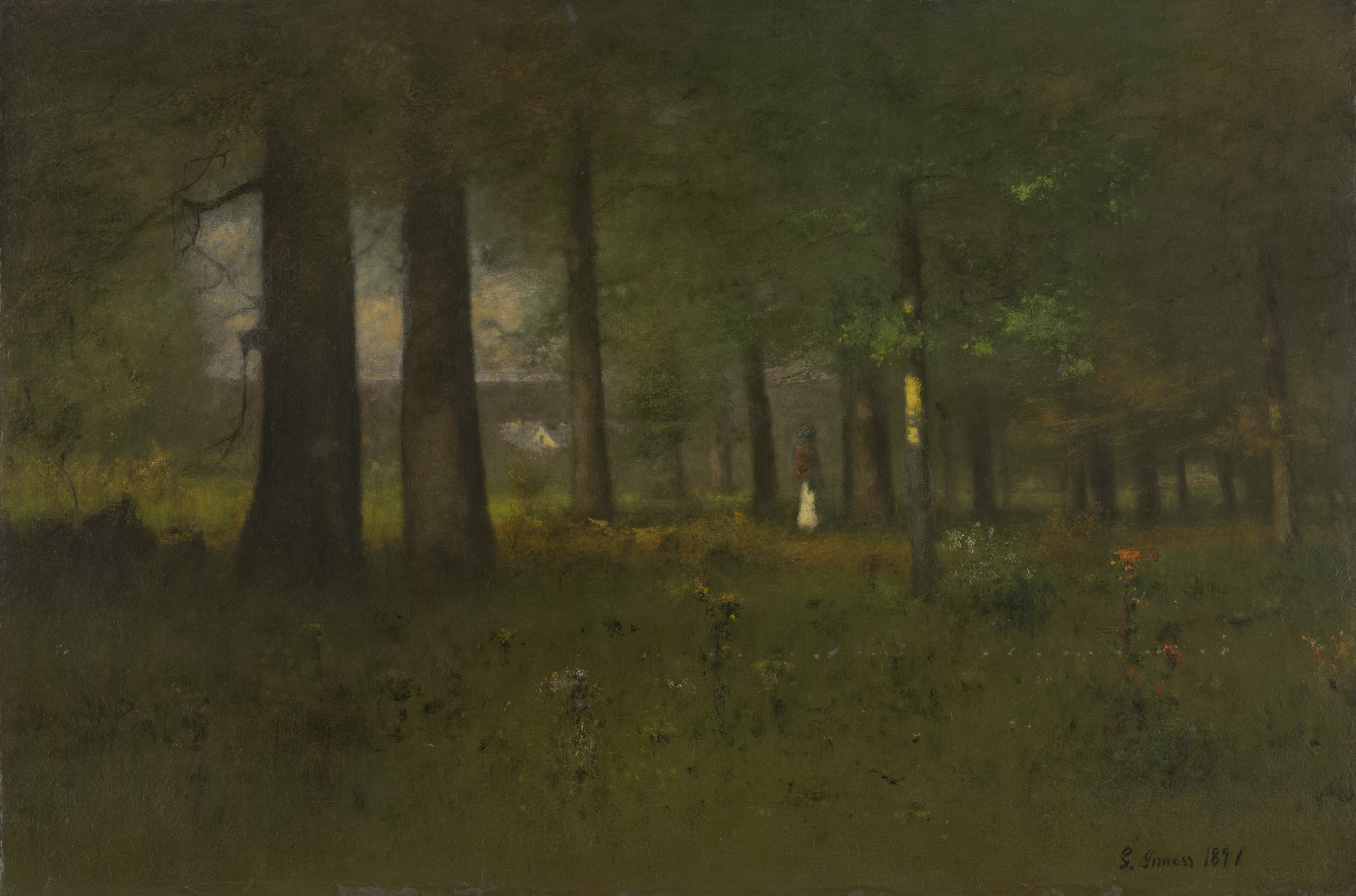
Edge of the Forest, oil on canvas, 1891, Yale University Art Gallery

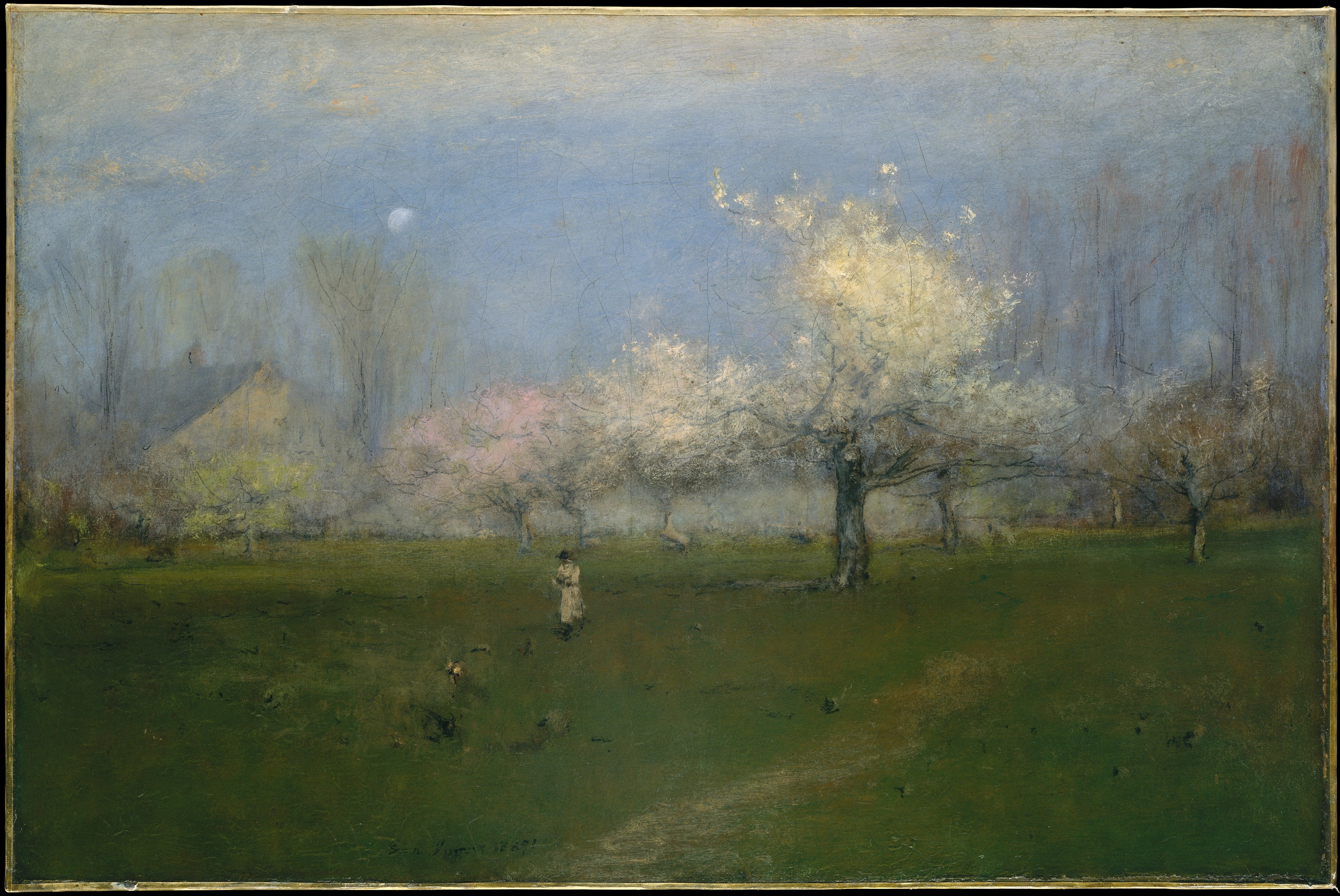
Spring Blossoms, Montclair, New Jersey, oil and crayon or charcoal on canvas, c.1891

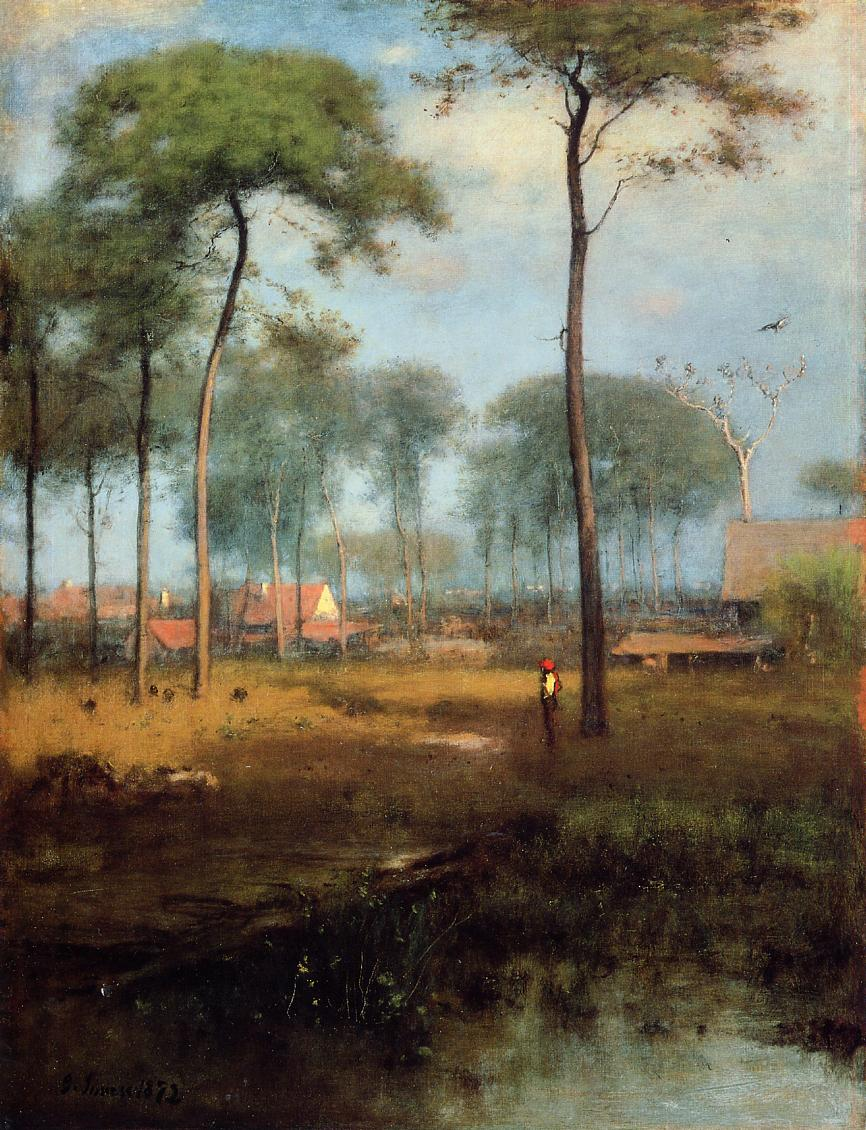
Early Morning, Tarpon Springs oil painting, 1892

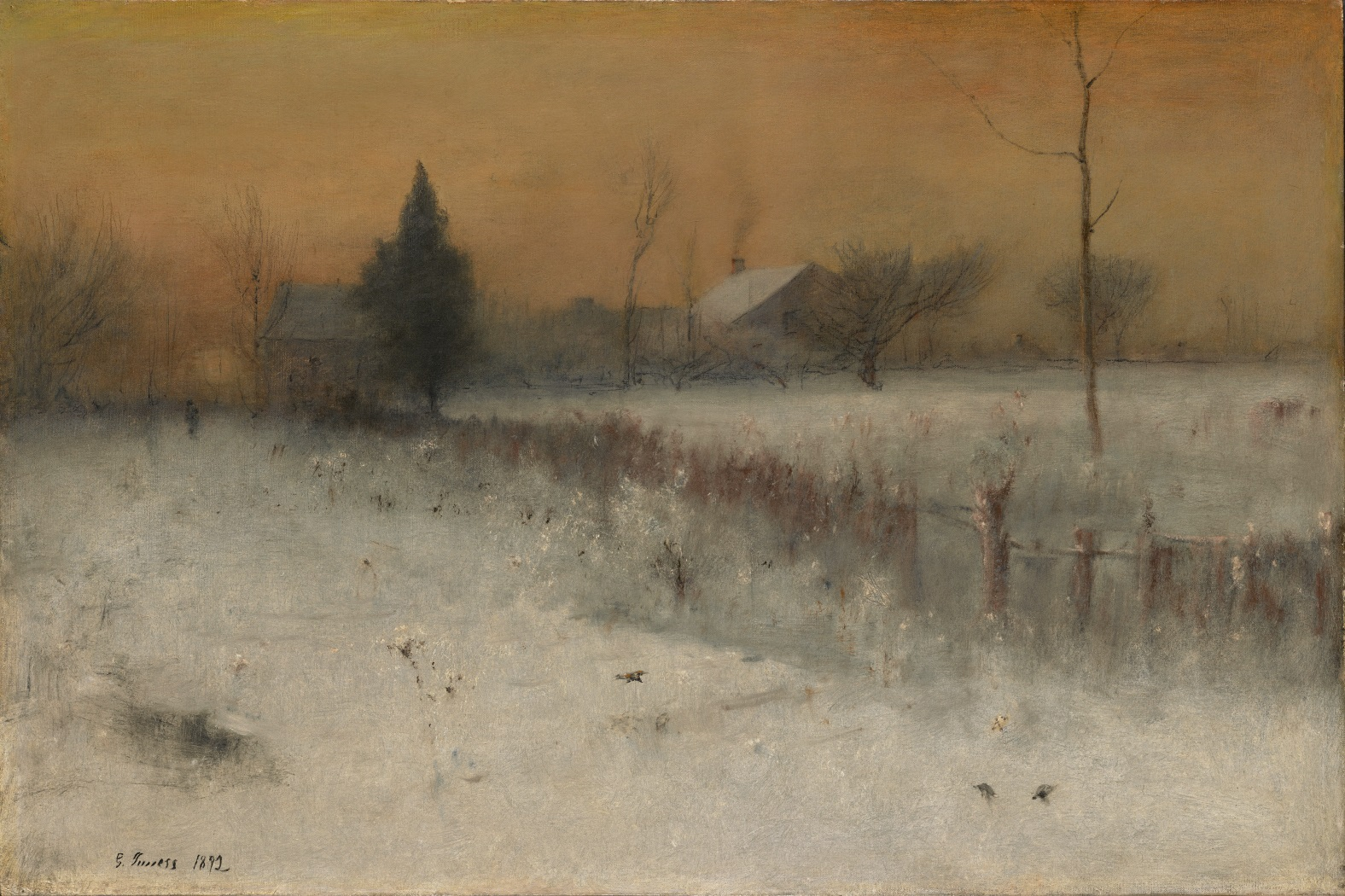
Home at Montclair, 1892, oil on canvas, Clark Art Institute

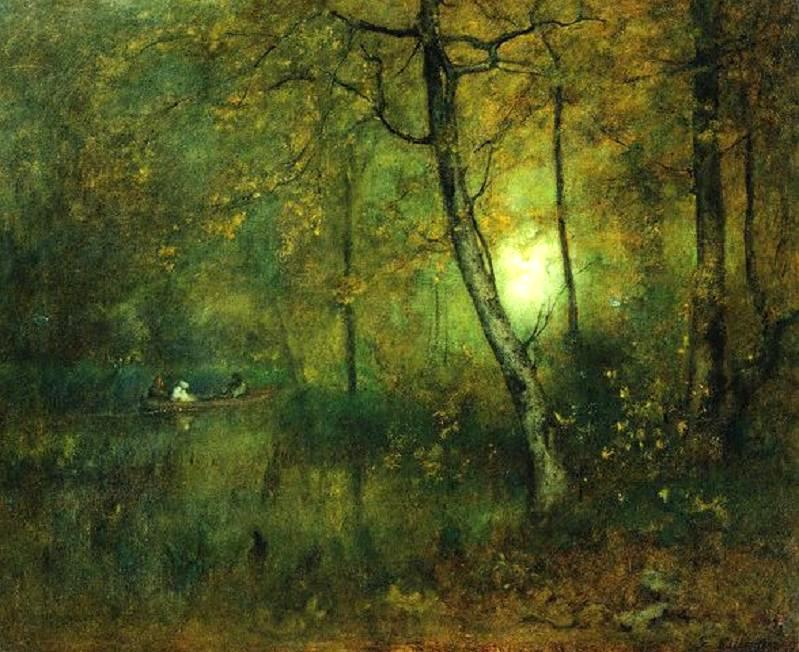
Pool in the Woods, 1892, oil painting

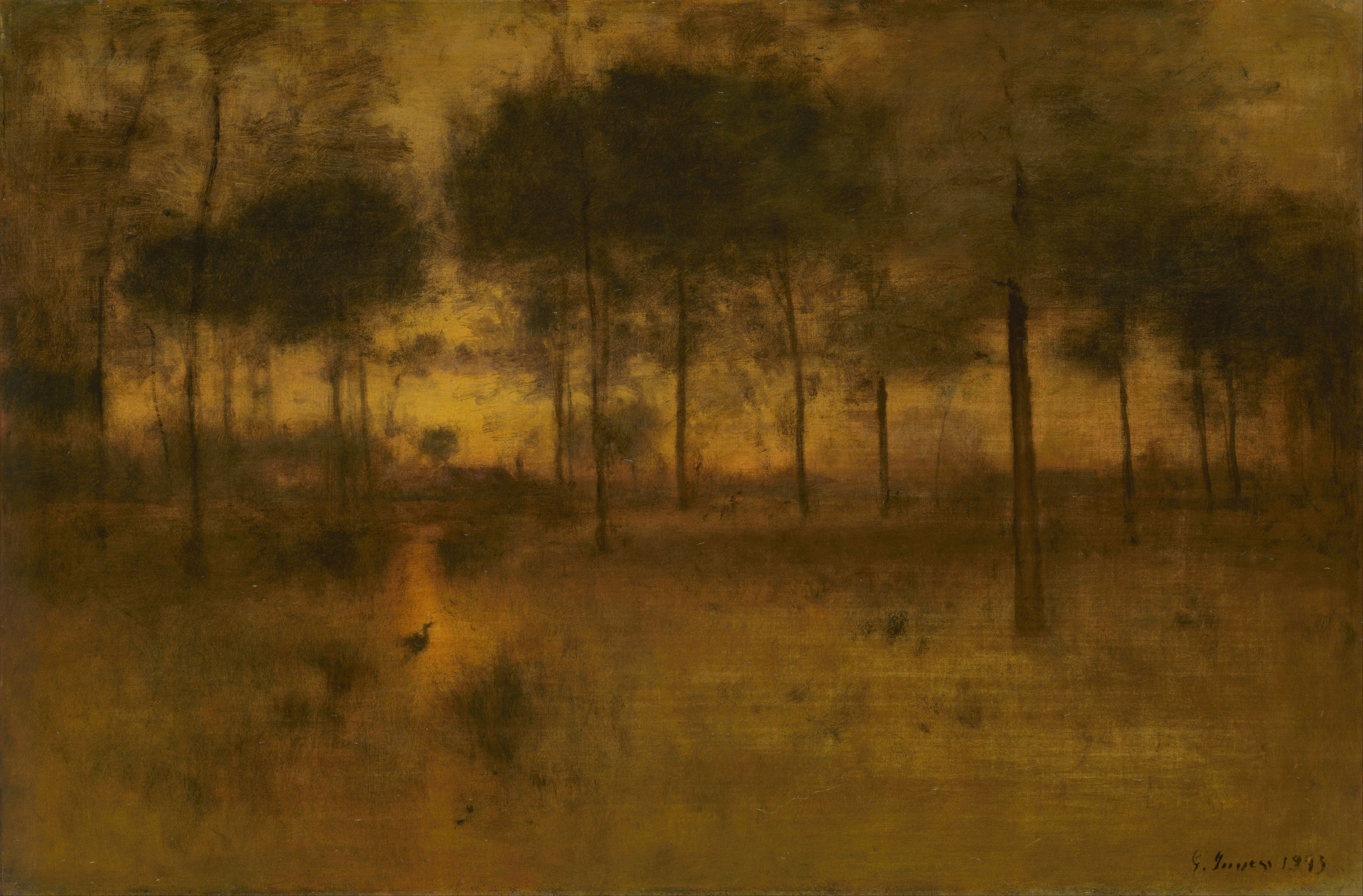
The Home of the Heron, 1893, Art Institute of Chicago

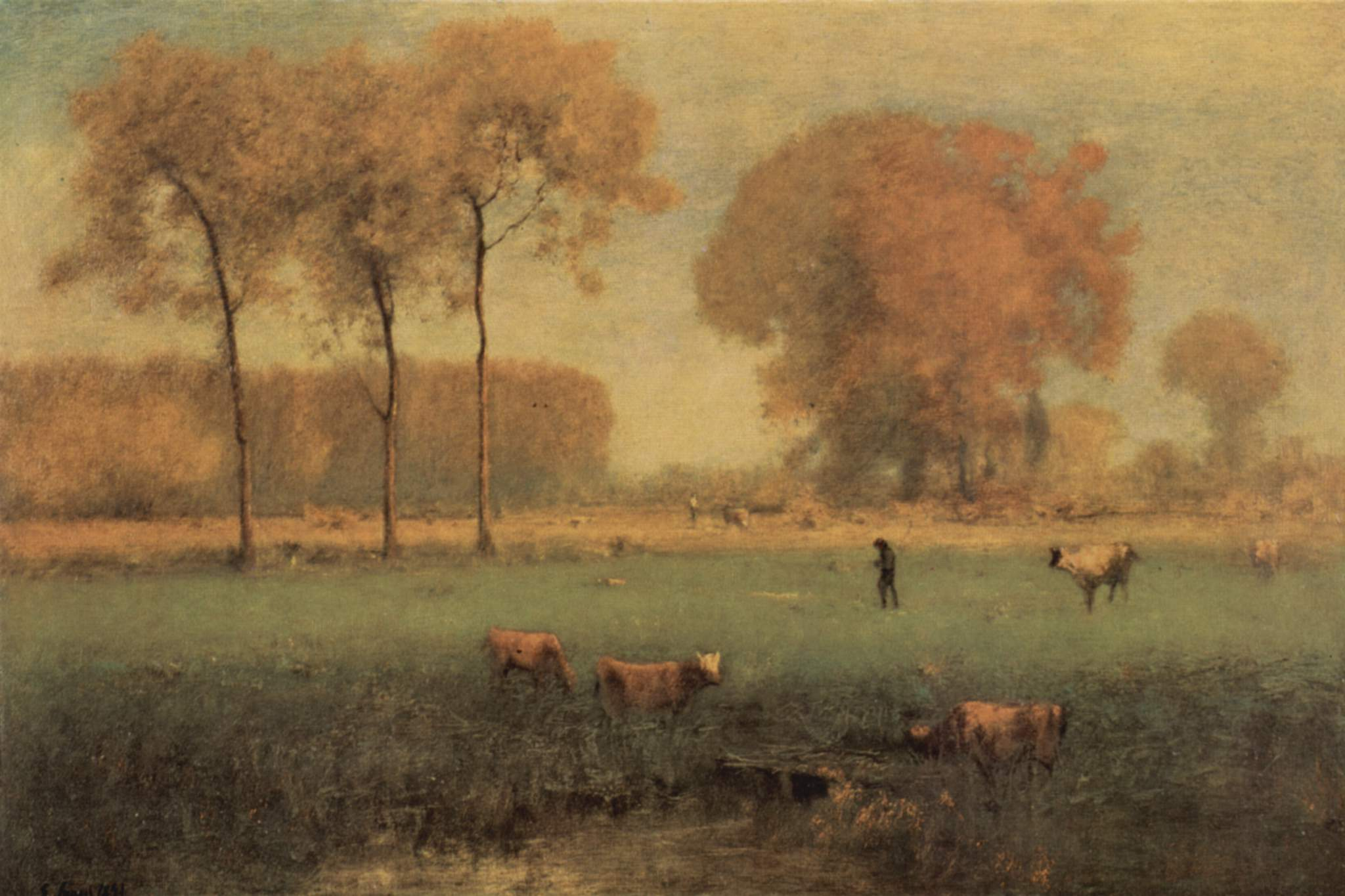
Indian Summer, 1894

== Works ==
- A Bit of the Roman Aqueduct (1852)
- Spring Blossoms, Montclair, New Jersey (c. 1891)
