= Arthur Hoeber =

American painter (1854–1915)

- Born: July 23, 1854; New York City, U.S.
- Died: April 29, 1915 (aged 60); Nutley, New Jersey, U.S.
- Education: Art Students League of New York; Beaux-Arts de Paris
- Occupation: Painter

Arthur Hoeber (July 23, 1854 New York City – April 29, 1915 Nutley, New Jersey) was an American painter best known for his writing on art-related subjects.

== Biography ==
He studied with James Carroll Beckwith at the Art Students League of New York, and with Jean-Léon Gérôme in Paris at the École des Beaux Arts. He exhibited for the first time at the Salon of 1882 (“Sur la Grande Route”; in 1885 his offering was “Le Pain Quotidien”) and was a contributor to most American exhibitions. While well known as a successful painter, his reputation perhaps rests on his art criticism. He was art director for the New York Times for three years and was assistant editor of The Illustrated American for one year. He later was art critic for the New York Globe and Commercial Advertiser. He was also widely known as a lecturer on art subjects. He was a member of the International Art Association of Chicago, and was elected an associate of the National Academy. During the last years of his life, Hoeber resided on The Enclosure, a street in Nutley, New Jersey, that had long been the home to many artists.

== Works ==
His popular writings include The Treasures of the Metropolitan Museum of Art (1892) and Painting in the Nineteenth Century in France, Belgium, Spain and Italy (1901).
