= Stacey Cunningham =

67th president of the New York Stock Exchange

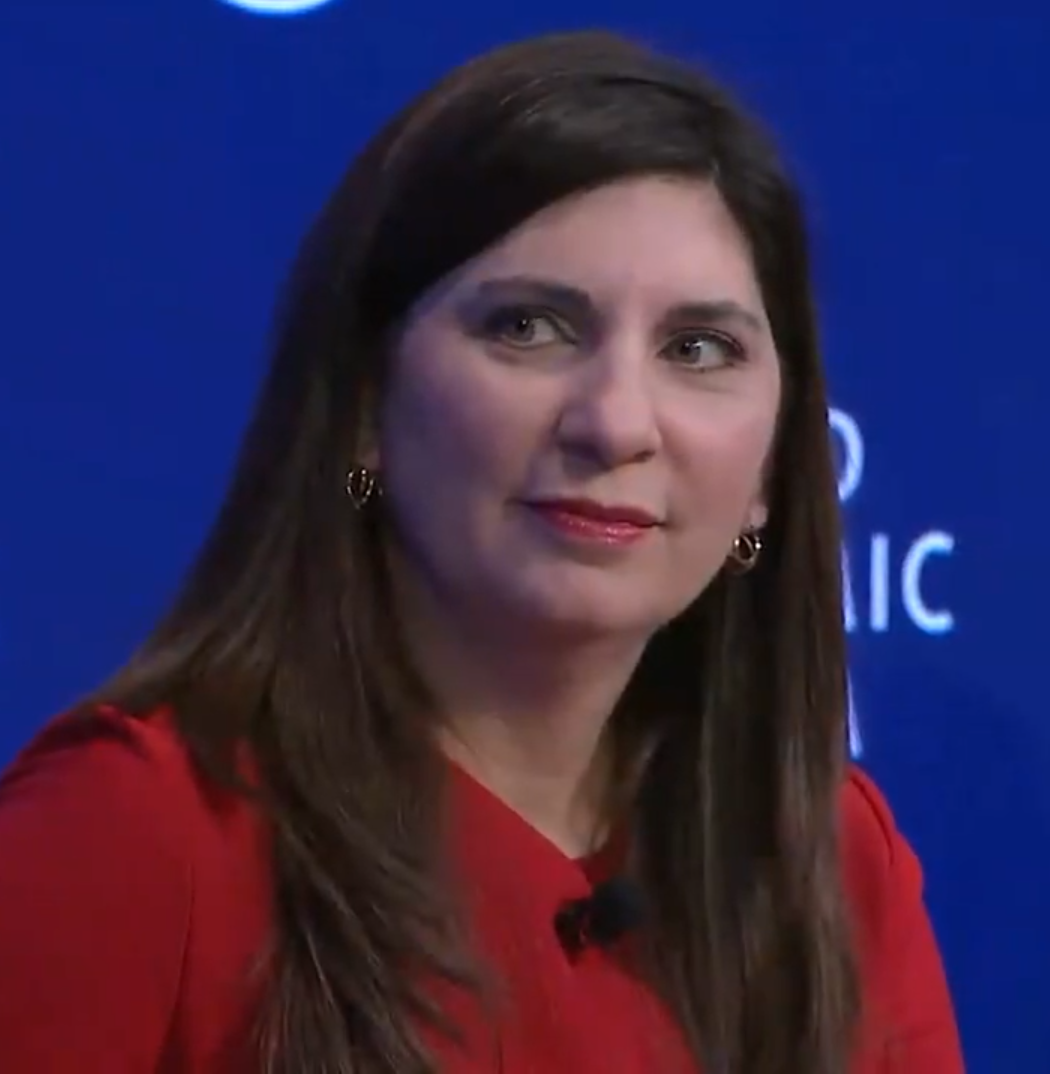
- Cunningham in 2020

President of the New York Stock Exchange
- In office May 22, 2018 – January 2, 2022
- Preceded by: Thomas W. Farley
- Succeeded by: Lynn Martin

Personal details
- Born: 1974 or 1975 (age 51–52)
- Education: Lehigh University
- Occupation: Banker

Stacey Cunningham (born 1974 or 1975) is an American banker who served as the 67th president of the New York Stock Exchange (NYSE) from 2018 to 2022. She was the second female president of the NYSE, but the first to hold full leadership of the exchange.

After interning with the NYSE during the 1990s, Cunningham became a trading floor clerk, continuing to work at the exchange until 2005. She took time off to complete a culinary training course, then working at the Nasdaq stock exchange as director of capital markets and head of sales for U. S. transaction services. In 2012, Cunningham rejoined the NYSE, and became the exchange's chief operating officer in 2015.

On May 22, 2018, Cunningham was appointed president of the NYSE. In November 2018, she was listed in 100 Women. In December 2021, she announced that she would be stepping down from her role as NYSE president and joining the NYSE board of directors.

== Early life ==
As a child, Cunningham had a strong interest in math and science in school. She later studied at Lehigh University, graduating in 1996 with a bachelor's degree in industrial engineering. She has five siblings and when she was young her father worked at a brokerage firm.

== Career ==
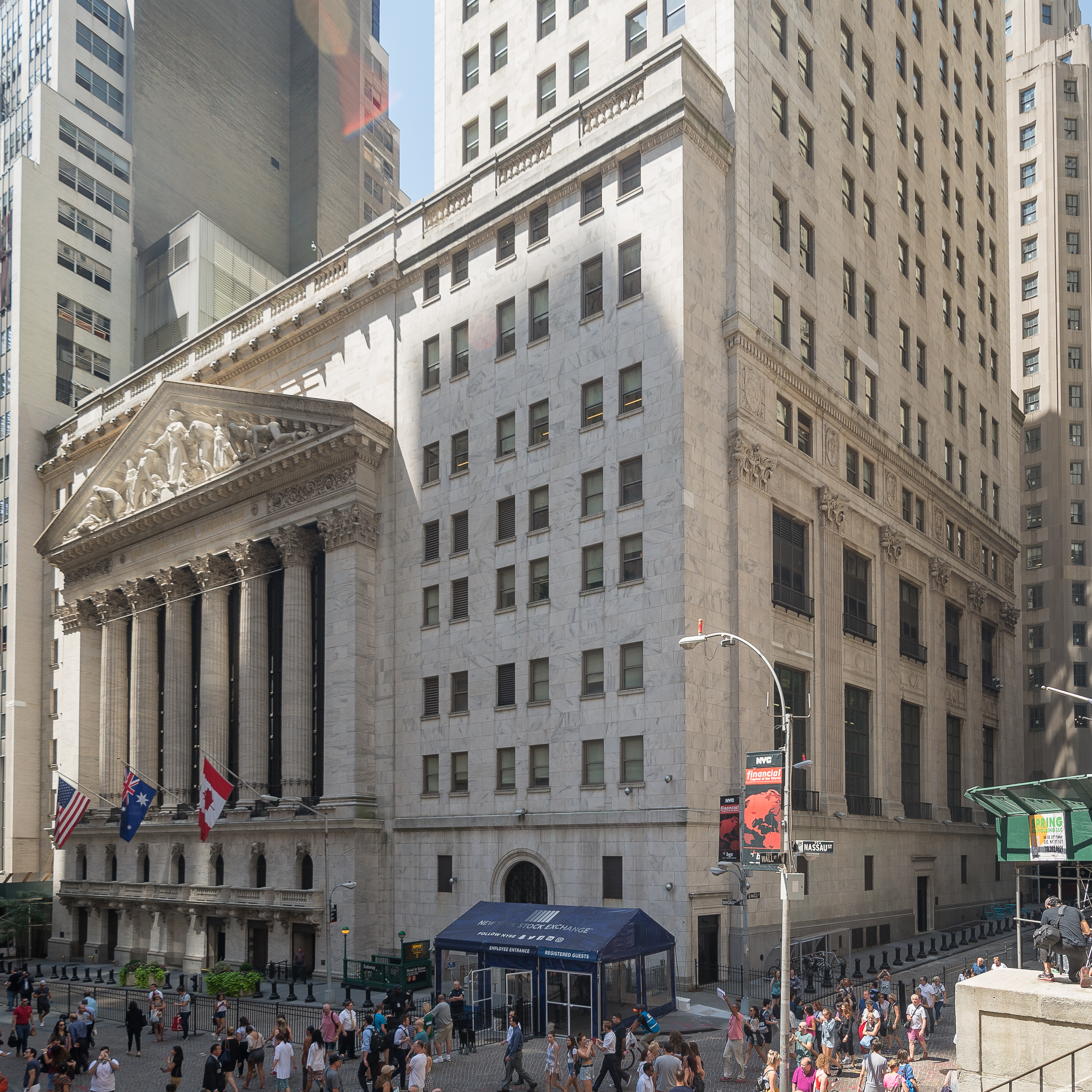
The New York Stock Exchange Building

In 1994, while still a university student, Cunningham completed a summer internship at the NYSE. Two years later, she began working there as a trading floor clerk. At the time, Cunningham was one of the few dozen female employees on the trading floor – compared to over a thousand male employees. She spent eight years employed as a specialist for Bank of America.

In 2005, feeling frustrated with the lack of technological transition at the NYSE, she left the exchange and studied at the Institute of Culinary Education, working briefly as a chef at a restaurant.

From 2007 to 2011, Cunningham worked at the Nasdaq stock exchange, first as director of capital markets and then as the head of sales for U.S. transaction services.

Cunningham rejoined the NYSE in 2012. She served as the exchange's chief operating officer from 2015 to 2018. Her job involved handling the exchange's cash equities markets, relationship and product management, and internal governance services.

On May 22, 2018, at the age of 43, Cunningham was named the 67th president of the NYSE, taking over from Thomas Farley. Cunningham is the first woman to be appointed president of the NYSE. Although Catherine Kinney had been co-president of the exchange in 2002, the position had not entailed full leadership at the time, being firmly overseen by the CEO or chairman of the NYSE. In an interview with reporters, Cunningham said that she has handled working in traditionally male-dominated environments – such as stock exchanges or engineering school – by never showing any doubt about "whether or not I should be where I was.”

In December 2021, Cunningham announced that she planned to step down from her role as NYSE president and join the exchange's board of directors, with Intercontinental Exchange executive Lynn Martin replacing her on January 3, 2022.

In 2025, she was appointed to the Board of Directors at Cloudflare.
