= Lynn Martin =

Lynn Martin may refer to:

- Lynn Martin (banker), 68th president of the New York Stock Exchange
- Lynn Martin (writer), U.S. TV writer
- Lynn Morley Martin (born 1939), U.S. politician
