= List of presidents of the New York Stock Exchange =

Market Rumors

This is a list of presidents of the New York Stock Exchange.

President
1817–1818	Anthony Stockholm
1818–1824	Gurdon S. Mumford
1824–1827	Edward Lyde
1827–1830	James W. Bleecker
1830–1831	Russell Hubbard Nevins
1831–1834	John Ward
1834–1835	R. D. Weeks
1835–1836	Edward Prime
1836–1837	R. D. Weeks
1837–1851	David Clarkson
1851–1852	Henry G. Stebbins
1852–1857	Charles R. Marvin
1857–1858	John R. Gourlie
1858–1859	Henry G. Stebbins
1859–1861	William H. Neilson
1861–1862	W. R. Vermilye
1862–1863	Abraham B. Baylis
1863–1864	Henry G. Stebbins
1864–1865	William Seymour Jr.
1865–1866	R. L. Cutting
1866–1867	William Alexander Smith
1867–1868	John Warren
1868–1869	William Searls
1869–1870	William H. Neilson
1870–1871	William Seymour Jr.
1871–1872	William B. Clerke
1872–1873	Edward King
1873–1874	Henry G. Chapman
1874–1875	George H. Brodhead
1875–1876	George W. McLean
1876–1877	Salem T. Russell
1877–1878	Henry Meigs Jr.
1878–1880	Brayton Ives
1880–1882	Donald Mackay
1882–1883	Frederick N. Lawrence
1883–1884	Alfrederick S. Hatch
1884–1886	J. Edward Simmons
1886–1888	James D. Smith
1888–1890	William L. Bull
1890–1892	Watson B. Dickerman
1892–1894	Frank K. Sturgis
1894–1898	Francis L. Eames
1898–1903	Rudolph Keppler
1903–1904	Ransom H. Thomas
1904–1907	Henry K. Pomroy
1907–1912	Ransom H. Thomas
1912–1914	James B. Mabon
1914–1919	Henry George Stebbins Noble
1919–1921	William H. Remick
1921–1924	Seymour L. Cromwell
1924–1930	Edward H. H. Simmons
1930–1935	Richard Whitney
1935–1938	Charles R. Gay
1938–1941	William McChesney Martin, Jr.
1941–1951	Emil Schram
1951–1967	G. Keith Funston
1967–1972	Robert W. Haack
1972–1975	Richard M. Burdge
1980–1984	John J. Phelan, Jr.
1985–1988	Robert J. Birnbaum
1988–1995	Richard A. Grasso
1996–2001	William R. Johnston
Presidents and Co-Chief Operating Officers
2002–2005	Robert G. Britz
2002–2008	Catherine R. Kinney
2006–2007	Gerald D. Putnam
2007–2008	Duncan L. Niederauer
No President between May 2008 and May 2014
President
2014–2018	Thomas W. Farley
2018–2021	Stacey Cunningham
2022–present	Lynn Martin
