= Robert W. Haack =

American banker

President of the New York Stock Exchange
- In office 1967–1972
- Preceded by: G. Keith Funston
- Succeeded by: John J. Phelan Jr. (in 1980)

Personal details
- Born: Robert William Haack; February 15, 1917 Wauwatosa, Wisconsin, U.S.
- Died: June 14, 1992 (aged 74–75) Potomac, Maryland, U.S.
- Spouse: Catharine Rademaker (m. 1942; died 1984) Ann Thornett Miller (m. 1990)
- Children: 4
- Education: Hope College; Harvard Business School

Robert William Haack (February 15, 1917 – June 14, 1992) was an American banker who served as president of the New York Stock Exchange and chairman of the Lockheed Aircraft Corporation.

== Early life ==
Haack was born in Wauwatosa near Milwaukee, Wisconsin, on February 15, 1917. His father founded and headed a Mutual of New York insurance agency, which was later run by his brother Frank Haack.

In 1938, he graduated from Hope College, a private, Christian liberal arts college in Holland, Michigan. After Hope, he attended Harvard Business School on a scholarship provided by Milwaukee alumni, where he graduated in 1940.

== Career ==
In 1940, he returned to Milwaukee where he began his career in the securities industry as a stockbroker with Robert W. Baird & Company. After moving from trader to head of the department, then syndicate manager and later institutional sales manager, he became a partner at Baird in 1950 before moving to Washington in 1964.

On April 1, 1964, he became president of the National Association of Securities Dealers (predecessor to the Financial Industry Regulatory Authority). He left the NASD in 1967 to become the fourth full-time president of the New York Stock Exchange, the nation's largest stock exchange. While president of the Exchange, "he put a high priority on development of several automation programs, including one intended to reduce the physical movement of securities from one brokerage house to another." During the near collapse of the financial markets in 1970, dozens of brokerage firms either collapsed or were forced into mergers, including prominent firms like Hayden Stone, Inc. and F. I. du Pont. Haack responded by working with Congress to develop the Securities Investor Protection Corporation. Prior to the end of his term, Haack was an early and strong advocate for ending fixed commission rates at the NYSE and moving to the negotiated rates we have today. After his term as president ended in 1972, there was no president of the Exchange between May 1972 until May 1980 when John J. Phelan, Jr. assumed the presidency.

He served as a director of Merrill Lynch, Pierce, Fenner & Smith Inc., Nabisco, Inc. and several other corporations.

In 1976, after several international bribery scandals which involved the Lockheed Aircraft Corporation and other American companies, Haack was named chairman of the Lockheed Aircraft Corporation. During his twenty months as chairman, he worked to "restore confidence in the company and revised its finances based around a Federal loan guarantee." He retired in September 1977.

== Personal life ==
In 1942, Haack married Catharine Rademaker, the daughter of Walter Rademaker and the granddaughter of Godfrey Augustyn, a past president of the Marine National Bank in Milwaukee. After the passing of Catharine in 1984, Haack married Ann (Née Thornett) Miller in 1990 (1930–2004), the daughter of Geoffrey Matthew Thornett former wife of Allison N. Miller Jr. He was the father of four children, one son, Thomas Haack, and three daughters, Barbara Haack Sexton, Elizabeth Haack Barr, and Linda Haack Brooks.

Haack died of complications from kidney failure at his home in Potomac, Maryland.
