= Martin W. Kellogg =

American portrait painter (1905–1989)

Martin W. Kellogg (July 2, 1905 – December 26, 1989) was an American portrait painter.

== Biography ==
He was born in Hartford, Connecticut at his family home, which had been passed down through many generations. In his final years, he lived in Nashville. As a young man he had lived in the Boston area where he attended the Boston Art School, and was in the Class of 1929 at Amherst College. He painted a portrait of Stephanie Zimbalist (the sister of Efrem Zimbalist, Jr.) when she was a young woman, but would not sell it to her parents as he didn't want the picture "out there". He was also in the habit of making his subjects cover any "imperfections" they might have with their clothing, because he adamantly refused to simply paint them out.

Some of his best-known portraits include:

- John Hill, who was president of Aetna insurance in Hartford in the 1960s
- Frank L Boyden, headmaster of Deerfield Academy (MA) (1902–1968)
- Wallace W. Robbins, Minister of the First Unitarian Church in Worcester, MA from 1956 to 1975
- G. Keith Funston, President of Trinity College
- Benjamin L. Holland, President of the Phoenix Mutual Life Insurance Company.

He also painted several Governors of Tennessee, including Winfield Dunn, Frank G. Clement and James Nance McCord, which may be seen at the Tennessee State Museum.

In addition to painting, he had a passion for English Setters, which he bred, raised, trained and showed in championship field trial competitions.
