= Henry Noble =

Henry Noble may refer to:

- Henry Bloom Noble (1816–1903), philanthropist and businessman in the Isle of Man
- Henry George Stebbins Noble (1859–1946), president of the New York Stock Exchange
- Henry Winston Noble (1909–1964), member of the Queensland Legislative Assembly
