= William Seymour Jr. =

American banker (1818–1882)

President of the New York Stock Exchange
- In office 1870–1871
- Preceded by: William H. Neilson
- Succeeded by: William B. Clerke
- In office 1864–1865
- Preceded by: Henry G. Stebbins
- Succeeded by: Robert L. Cutting

Personal details
- Born: October 2, 1818 Albany, New York, U.S.
- Died: January 9, 1882 (aged 63) New York City, New York, U.S.
- Resting place: Woodlawn Cemetery
- Spouse: Jane Rice Schmelzel

William Seymour Jr. (October 2, 1818 – January 9, 1882) was an American banker who twice served as president of the New York Stock Exchange.

== Early life ==
Seymour was born in Albany, New York on October 2, 1818. He was a son of William Seymour Sr. (1795–1866) and the former Jane Bradt (1797–1832).

His paternal grandparents were Truman Seymour and Zabiah (née Packard) Seymour.

== Career ==
In early 1837, he came to New York and began working with Phenix Bank there. After Phenix Bank, he founded the brokerage firm of Seymour & Hays, located at 54 Wall Street, with DeWitt C. Hays, who later became president of the Union Bank. The firm, which dealt in "paper, uncurrent money, and stocks" quickly ranked among the most respectable firms on Wall Street and operated until their mutually agreed to dissolve.

Seymour joined the New York Stock Exchange in 1847 and became involved in the various councils of that organization. He was twice chosen to serve as president of the Exchange, first in 1864 until 1865, and secondly in 1870 until 1871. Seymour is credited with "harmonizing conflicting interests and bringing about a coalition of the three old rival stock boards," thus creating the present day Stock Exchange. He focused on stringent, comprehensive laws of the Exchange and, reportedly, it was his idea to establish a system of safety vaults under the Exchange Building.

For the last ten years of his life, Seymour devoted himself to his own personal affairs. Six months before his death, he sold his seat in the Stock Exchange.

== Personal life ==
Seymour was married to Jane Rice Schmelzel (1820–1869), a daughter of John Blazius Schmelzel and Jane (née Ostheim) Schmelzel. Together, they were the parents of:

- Jane S. Seymour (1846–1857)
- Julia Seymour (1847–1875)
- William Webb Seymour (1850–1904)
- John Seymour (b. 1855)
- Mary W. Seymour (1857–1882), who married Luther Ainsworth Milbank, an 1864 Columbia Law School graduate.
- George Seymour (1859–1877)
- Emma Seymour (1861–1917), who married Albert Edward Gunther (1860–1918).

His wife died on June 13, 1869. After suffering from Bright's disease of the kidneys, Seymour died on January 9, 1882. After a funeral held at his residence, 45 West 56th Street, he was buried at Woodlawn Cemetery in the Bronx.
