= John A. Searing =

American politician (1805–1876)

Member of the U.S. House of Representatives from New York's 1st district
- In office March 4, 1857 – March 3, 1859
- Preceded by: William Valk
- Succeeded by: Luther C. Carter

Sheriff of Queens County, New York
- In office 1843–1846

Member of the New York State Assembly from the Queens County district
- In office 1854–1854
- Preceded by: Sylvanus S. Smith
- Succeeded by: James Rider

Personal details
- Born: John Alexander Searing; May 14, 1805 North Hempstead, New York, U.S.
- Died: May 6, 1876 (aged 70) Mineola, New York, U.S.
- Resting place: Greenfield Cemetery, Uniondale, New York
- Party: Democratic
- Occupation: Politician, sheriff

John Alexander Searing (May 14, 1805 – May 6, 1876) was an American politician who served one term as a U.S. representative from New York from 1857 to 1859.

== Biography ==
Born in North Hempstead, New York, Searing completed preparatory studies. He served as sheriff of Queens County, New York from 1843 to 1846. He was a member of the New York State Assembly (Queens County) in 1854.

=== Congress ===
Searing was elected as a Democrat to the 35th United States Congress (March 4, 1857 – March 3, 1859). He served as chairman of the Committee on Accounts (Thirty-fifth Congress). He declined to be a candidate for renomination in 1858.

=== Death and burial ===
He died in Mineola, New York on May 6, 1876. He was interred in Greenfield Cemetery in Uniondale, New York.

New York State Assembly
Preceded by Sylvanus S. Smith	New York State Assembly; Queens County; 1854	Succeeded by James Rider
U.S. House of Representatives
Preceded by William Valk	Member of the U.S. House of Representatives from New York's 1st congressional district 1857–1859	Succeeded by Luther C. Carter
