= Wessel S. Smith =

American politician from New York

Member of the New York State Assembly from Queens County
- In office 1847–1849
- Preceded by: John Willis
- Succeeded by: Joseph S. Snedeker

Wessel S. Smith (also spelled Wessell S. Smith) was an American politician from New York. He served as a member of the New York State Assembly from 1847 to 1849, representing Queens County.

== Political career ==
Smith was elected to the New York State Assembly and served in the 1847, 1848, and 1849 sessions, representing Queens County. In 1848, he was a member of the Legislative Committee on the removal of the quarantine, which investigated moving the state's Quarantine Establishment from Staten Island to Sandy Hook, New Jersey. He resided in Jamaica, Queens County.

== Personal life and death ==
His burial location is unknown.

== Notes ==
New York State Assembly
| Preceded by | New York State Assembly; Queens County; 1847–1849 | Succeeded by |
