= Henry K. Pomroy =

American banker (1854–1925)

President of the New York Stock Exchange
- In office 1903–1907
- Preceded by: Ransom H. Thomas
- Succeeded by: Ransom H. Thomas

Personal details
- Born: Henry Keney Pomroy; August 14, 1854 New York City, New York, U.S.
- Died: December 22, 1925 (aged 71) New York City, New York, U.S.
- Spouse: Anna Tuffle Moseley (m. 1881; died 1920)
- Parent(s): Daniel Pomroy; Fanny Belden Pomroy
- Education: Columbia School of Mines

Henry Keney Pomroy (August 14, 1854 – December 22, 1925) was an American financier who served as president of the New York Stock Exchange.

== Early life ==
Pomroy was born in New York City on August 14, 1854. He was the eldest child of Daniel Pomroy of Coventry, Connecticut, and his wife, Fanny Belden, of Simsbury, a descendant of Horace Belden.

After his father died when he was just twelve years old, his mother, brother and sisters moved to Stamford, Connecticut, before Henry attended boarding school at Mount Carmel and in Ossining, New York, before studying at the Columbia School of Mines for one year.

== Career ==
After spending some time in Europe with his family, in 1875 he joined his uncle, A. Hamilton Pomroy, a dealer in commercial paper. On January 3, 1878, he was elected a member of the New York Stock Exchange. In 1888, he was elected to the Board of Governors of the Exchange, serving until his death in 1925. He was vice president for three terms, from May 1901 to May 1904, followed by three terms as president from 1904 to 1907.

In 1914, Pomroy testified before the U.S. Senate Committee on Banking and Currency and expressed his "approval of legislature prohibiting certain evils of the stock market sought to be corrected by the bill before the committee, incorporating stock exchanges, and excluding from the mails and interstate wires quotations of exchanges not fully complying with its provisions."

At the time of his death, Pomroy was a special partner with the firm of J. W. Davis & Co., and previously was a partner with his brother Arthur in a firm known as Pomroy Brothers.

== Personal life ==
On December 8, 1881, Pomroy was married to Anna Tuffle Moseley (1857–1920). The Pomroy's had a home known as Duneside near Georgica Pond in Wainscott, a hamlet in the southwest corner of Easthampton, New York.

Pomroy died at his residence, 127 East 40th Street in Manhattan, on December 22, 1925. His estate was valued at $2,310,178, of which $2,183,422 was bequeathed to his sister, Mrs. Josephine Belden (née Pomroy) Hendrick, and $15,000 in cash to his brother, A. Arthur Pomroy.

In 1976, his niece, Grace (née Hendrick) Eustis Phillips, and her husband, Rear Admiral Neill Phillips, donated Midsummer Twilight by Willard Leroy Metcalf to the National Gallery of Art, which Grace had inherited from Pomroy.

Business positions
Preceded by Ransom H. Thomas	President of the New York Stock Exchange; 1904 – 1907	Succeeded by Ransom H. Thomas
