= Luther C. Carter =

American politician

Chairman of the U.S. House Committee on the District of Columbia
- In office March 4, 1859 – March 3, 1861
- Preceded by: William Osborne Goode
- Succeeded by: John F. Potter

Member of the U.S. House of Representatives from New York's 1st district
- In office March 4, 1859 – March 3, 1861
- Preceded by: John A. Searing
- Succeeded by: Edward H. Smith

Personal details
- Born: February 25, 1805 Bethel, Massachusetts, US (now Maine)
- Died: January 3, 1875 (aged 69) New York City, US
- Resting place: Green-Wood Cemetery, Brooklyn, New York
- Party: Republican
- Spouse: Mary L. Converse (m. 1829)
- Children: 10
- Occupation: Businessman; Farmer

Luther Cullen Carter (February 25, 1805 – January 3, 1875) was a U.S. representative from New York.

== Biography ==
Carter was born in Bethel in Massachusetts' District of Maine on February 25, 1805, a son of Dr. Timothy Carter and Frances "Fanny" (Freeland) Carter. He was educated in Maine, and pursued a business and mercantile career in Saco. At age 20, he moved to New York City, where he continued his business career and served as president of the Market Savings Bank.

In addition to his business career, Carter served as a member of the Board of Education of New York City for several years beginning in 1853. He later moved to Long Island City, where he lived in semi-retirement as a gentleman farmer.

Carter was elected as a Republican to the 36th Congress (March 4, 1859 – March 3, 1861). During his term, Carter served as chairman of the Committee on the District of Columbia. He was an unsuccessful candidate for reelection in 1860 to the 37th Congress.

Carter died in New York City January 3, 1875. He was interred in Brooklyn's Green-Wood Cemetery, Section 113, Lot 18623.

== Family ==
On September 29, 1829, Carter married Mary L. Converse (d. 1882) of Palmer, Massachusetts. They were the parents of 10 children, three of whom lived to adulthood. Carter's siblings included Timothy J. Carter, who also served in Congress.

U.S. House of Representatives
Preceded by John A. Searing	Member of the U.S. House of Representatives from New York's 1st congressional district 1859–1861	Succeeded by Edward H. Smith
