= Joseph S. Snedeker =

American politician from New York

Member of the New York State Assembly from Queens County
- In office 1850–1850
- Preceded by: Wessel S. Smith
- Succeeded by: James Maurice

Joseph S. Snedeker was an American politician from New York. He served as a member of the New York State Assembly in 1850, representing Queens County.

== Political career ==
Snedeker was elected to the New York State Assembly and served in the 1850 session, representing Queens County. He was succeeded in the Assembly by James Maurice, who took office in 1851.

== Personal life and death ==
His burial location is unknown.

New York State Assembly
Preceded by Wessel S. Smith	New York State Assembly; Queens County; 1850	Succeeded by James Maurice
