= Sylvanus S. Smith =

American politician (1803–1888)

Member of the New York State Assembly from Queens County
- In office 1852–1853
- Preceded by: James Maurice
- Succeeded by: John A. Searing

Personal details
- Born: July 4, 1803 Herricks, Queens County, New York, U.S.
- Died: March 11, 1888 (aged 84) North Hempstead, Queens County (now Nassau County), New York, U.S.
- Spouse: Elizabeth Louisa Treadwell ()

Sylvanus S. Smith (July 4, 1803 – March 11, 1888) was an American politician from New York. He served as a member of the New York State Assembly in 1852 and 1853, representing Queens County.

== Early life ==
Smith was born on July 4, 1803, in Herricks, Queens County, New York (now part of Nassau County). He married Elizabeth Louisa Treadwell (1806–1839).

== Political career ==
Smith was elected to the New York State Assembly and served in the 1852 and 1853 sessions, representing Queens County. He was succeeded in the Assembly by John A. Searing, who took office in 1854.

== Later life and death ==
Smith died on March 11, 1888, in North Hempstead, Queens County (now Nassau County), New York, at the age of 84. His burial location is unknown.

New York State Assembly
Preceded by James Maurice	New York State Assembly; Queens County; 1852–1853	Succeeded by John A. Searing
