= Ransom H. Thomas =

American banker (1852–1922)

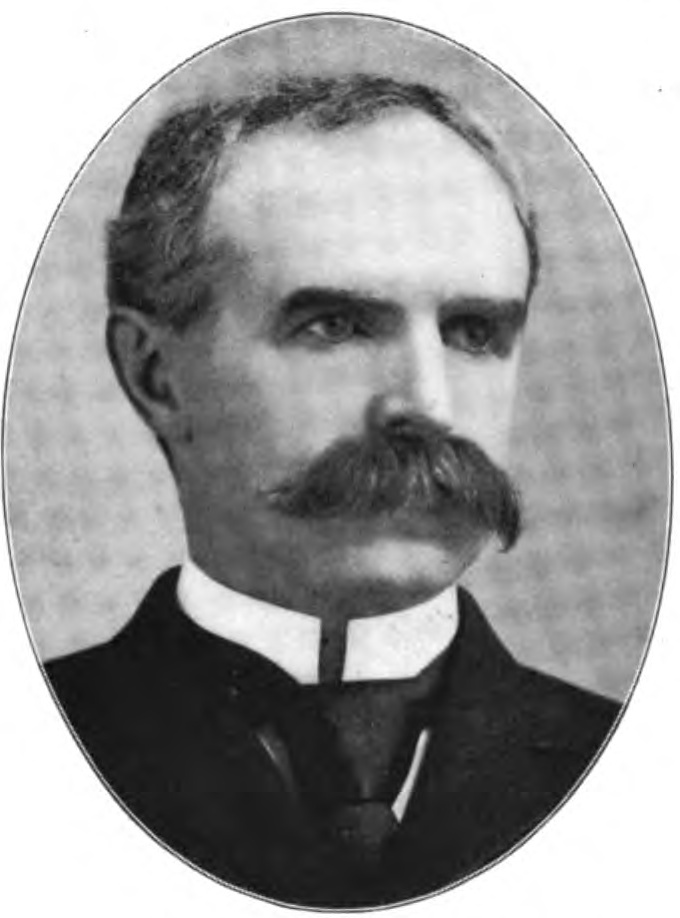

President of the New York Stock Exchange
- In office 1907–1912
- Preceded by: Henry K. Pomroy
- Succeeded by: James B. Mabon
- In office 1903–1904
- Preceded by: Rudolph Keppler
- Succeeded by: Henry K. Pomroy

Personal details
- Born: Ransom Halloway Thomas; August 9, 1852
- Died: October 19, 1922 (aged 70) New York City, U.S.
- Resting place: Sleepy Hollow Cemetery
- Spouse: Susan Reed Herrick (m. 1880)
- Children: 4

Ransom Halloway Thomas (August 9, 1852 – October 19, 1922) was an American banker who served as president of the New York Stock Exchange during the Panic of 1907.

== Early life ==
Thomas was born on August 9, 1852, and named after Ransom Halloway, a former U.S. Representative from New York's 8th congressional district.

== Career ==
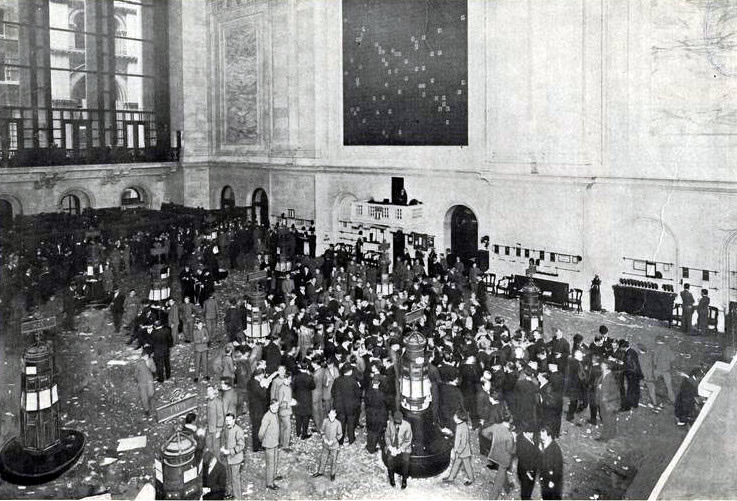
Floor of the New York Stock Exchange (pictured in 1908)

In 1885, he was a member of the banking firm of Titus & Thomas located at 4 Broad Street. Thomas established the firm of R. H. Thomas & Son, which was located at 100 Broadway. Shortly before his death, he sold his seat as a board member of the Exchange after nearly fifty years of membership (having acquired his seat on November 5, 1874). Throughout his time with the Exchange, he was associated with the chief committees of the Exchange and was President of the Stock Exchange Building Company at the time of his death.

In 1903, Thomas succeeded Rudolph Keppler as president of the New York Stock Exchange. He served as president of the Exchange during the Panic of 1907. Through Thomas' efforts, J. Pierpont Morgan and 14 bank presidents pledged $23.6 million to keep the stock exchange afloat.

In addition to his banking career, Thomas was an avid golfer and served as president of the United States Golf Association from 1905 to 1906. He was a member of the Morris County Golf Club in Convent, New Jersey, and was a former member of the executive committee of the United States Golf Association.

== Personal life ==
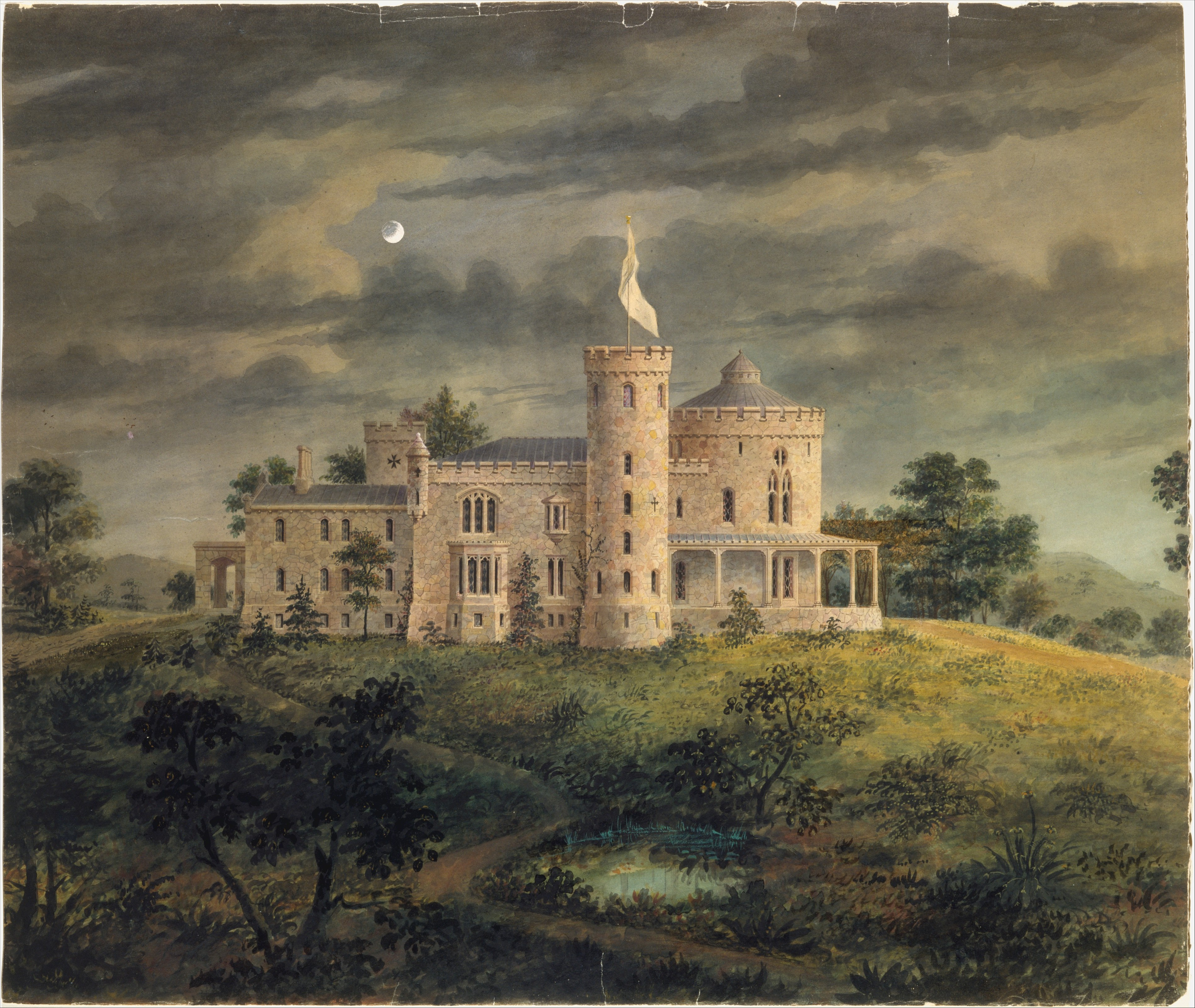
Ericstan, the country residence of Thomas' father-in-law.

In 1880, Thomas was married to Susan Reed "Susie" Herrick (1857–1942), a daughter of merchant John J. Herrick and Jane Eliza (née Van Buskerck) Herrick. Susie's father moved to Tarrytown, New York, in 1859 where "he had built one of the largest and finest castellated residences in America." The house known as Ericstan, was designed by Alexander Jackson Davis and demolished in 1944. Together, they were the parents of:

- Ransom Hallaway Thomas Jr. (1882–1939), a graduate of Harvard University, who married pilot Anna Ward (1907–1959).
- Frederick Herrick Thomas (1884–1940), a Yale University graduate. He died on the golf course in 1940.
- DeWitt Van Buskerck Thomas. He was listed on the New York Social Register in 1923. After his brother's death in 1939, he married his widow Anna.
- Elizabeth Herrick Thomas (1894–1911), who died aged 16.

In September 1901, Thomas purchased fellow enthusiast William K. Vanderbilt Jr.'s famous Daimler Phoenix automobile known as the "White Ghost." Vanderbilt had purchased the 23-hp car, the first four-cylinder road car, in Germany in 1900. Thomas later sold the car to John B. Drake of Chicago.

Following a three week illness, Thomas died of a throat ailment at the Memorial Hospital in New York City. He had been living at the Morristown Inn in Morristown, New Jersey, for the last six years. After services at St. Peter's Episcopal Church in Morristown, he was buried at Sleepy Hollow Cemetery in Tarrytown.
