= James B. Mabon =

American banker (1865–1941)

President of the New York Stock Exchange
- In office May 1912 – May 1914
- Preceded by: Ransom H. Thomas
- Succeeded by: Henry George Stebbins Noble

Personal details
- Born: James Brown Mabon; July 16, 1865 New Brunswick, New Jersey
- Died: March 10, 1941 (aged 75) New York City, New York, U.S.
- Spouse: Elise Howell Smith (m. 1898)
- Children: 5

James Brown Mabon (July 16, 1865 – March 10, 1941) was an American banker who served as president of the New York Stock Exchange.

== Early life ==
Mabon was born in New Brunswick, New Jersey on July 16, 1865. A son of Emiline (née Deas) Mabon and the Rev. Dr. William Van Vranken Mabon, a professor at the New Brunswick Theological Seminary. Among his siblings was the Rev. Dr. Arthur Mabon, and John Scott Mabon, Elisabeth Van Vranken Mabon, William Van Vranken Mabon, George Deas Mabon, and the Rev. Samuel Cliffton Mabon.

== Career ==
He began his career as an office boy with Brown Brothers, staying with them for many years before he formed a brokerage firm with his co-worker and close friend, William M. Kingsley, known as Kingsley, Mabon & Co., with offices at 45 Wall Street. Kingsley later retired from the firm and became chairman of the board of the United States Trust Company.

From May 1912 to May 1914, he served as president of the New York Stock Exchange, where he became a member in 1891. He served on most of the important committees of the Exchange in a period of twenty-nine years, and at various times was chairman and trustee of the gratuity fund, director and president of the New York Quotation Company, and director of president of the New York Stock Exchange Safe Deposit Company. In 1912, he was questioned by Samuel Untermyer during the Pujo Committee's money trust investigation.

On April 5, 1929, he resigned as a governor of the Exchange (where he had served since 1900), and in September 1931, after forty years on the Exchange, he sold his seat to Rudolph Nadel, who became a partner in Mabon & Co. At the time of his death, he was the senior partner of Mabon & Co. (later Mabon, Nugent & Co. and Mabon Securities Corp.) and one of the oldest trustees of the Bank of New York.

== Personal life ==
On January 6, 1898, Mabon was married to Elise Howell Smith (1875–1961) at the Collegiate Church at West End and 77th Street in New York. Smith, a daughter of Judge Abel I. Smith, was a member of the Colonial Dames of America. They lived at 420 Park Avenue in Manhattan and had a country home in Norfolk, Connecticut. Together, they were the parents of:

- James Brown Mabon Jr. (1899–1977), who married Mary Frost, a daughter of Sterling Frost of St. Louis and Florence, at the Church of Saint-Germain-des-Prés in 1929. She was a niece of Frederick A. Sterling, the American Minister to the Irish Free State.
- Laura Mabon (1901–1979), who married Harvey Childs III in 1921.
- Janet Mabon (1904–1965), who married William W. Schott, the second chargé d'affaires in Budapest.
- Kingsley Mabon, who married Martha Hall in 1938.
- Lisa Van Vranken Mabon (c. 1918–1993), who married John Martin Trent in 1941.

His portrait was painted by S. Seymour Thomas in 1922.

Mabon died suddenly of a heart attack at his residence, 420 Park Avenue, in March 1941. His widow, who was then living at 570 Park Avenue, died at Litchfield County Hospital in Winsted, Connecticut in May 1961.

Business positions
Preceded by Ransom H. Thomas	President of the New York Stock Exchange; 1912 – 1914	Succeeded by Henry George Stebbins Noble
