= William McChesney Martin =

American business executive (1906–1998)

William Martin
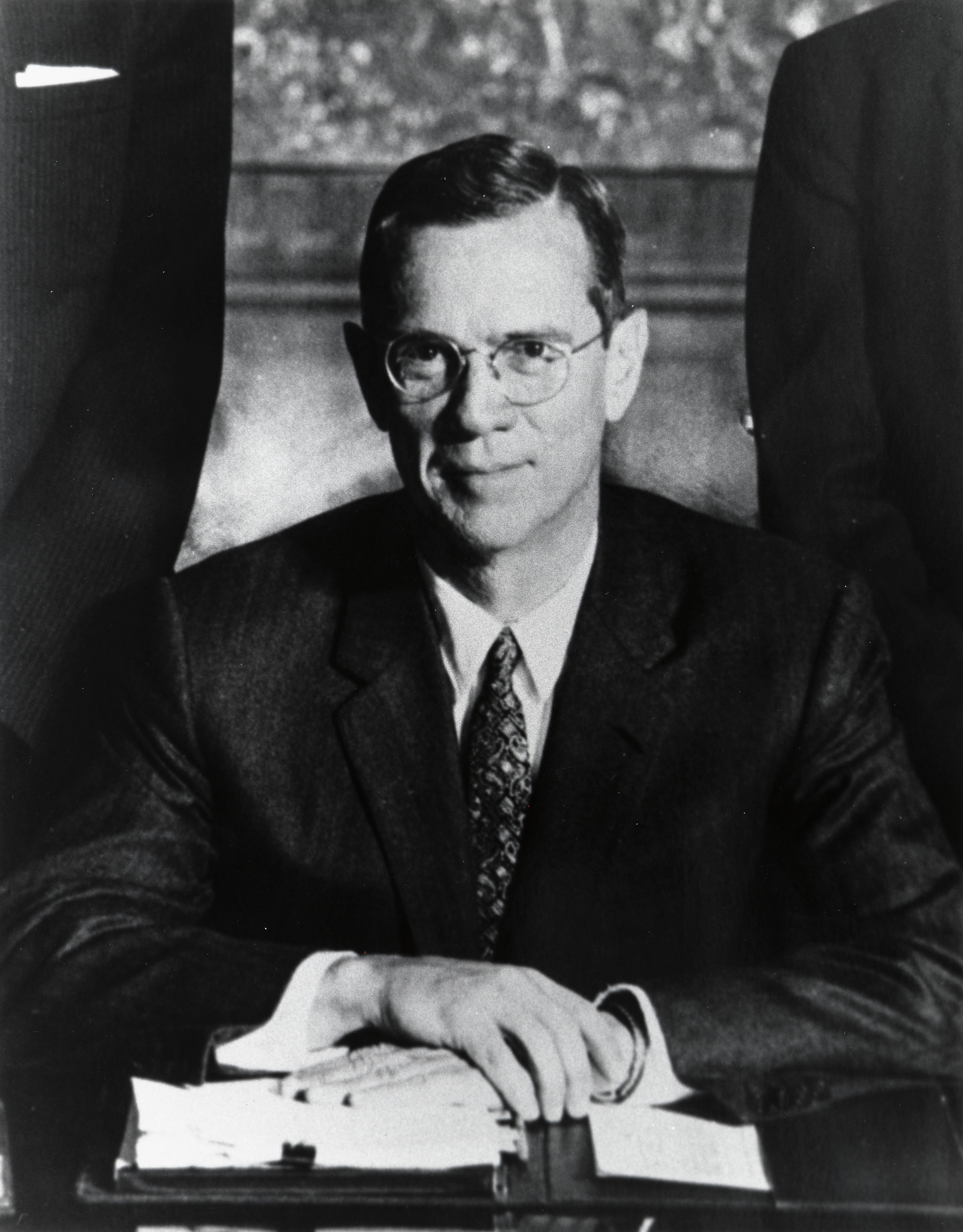

9th Chairman of the Federal Reserve
- In office April 2, 1951 – January 31, 1970
- President: Harry S. Truman; Dwight D. Eisenhower; John F. Kennedy; Lyndon B. Johnson; Richard Nixon
- Deputy: C. Canby Balderston; James Robertson
- Preceded by: Thomas B. McCabe
- Succeeded by: Arthur F. Burns

Member of the Federal Reserve Board of Governors
- In office April 2, 1951 – February 1, 1970
- President: Harry S. Truman; Dwight D. Eisenhower; John F. Kennedy; Lyndon B. Johnson; Richard Nixon
- Preceded by: Thomas B. McCabe
- Succeeded by: Arthur F. Burns

President of the New York Stock Exchange
- In office May 1938 – May 1941
- Preceded by: Charles R. Gay
- Succeeded by: Emil Schram

Personal details
- Born: William McChesney Martin Jr. December 17, 1906 St. Louis, Missouri, U.S.
- Died: July 27, 1998 (aged 91) Washington, D.C., U.S.
- Party: Democratic
- Education: Yale University (BA); Columbia University (attended)

William McChesney Martin Jr. (December 17, 1906 – July 27, 1998) was an American business executive who served as the 9th chairman of the Federal Reserve from 1951 to 1970, making him the longest holder of that position. He was nominated to the post by President Harry S. Truman and reappointed by four of his successors. Martin, who once considered becoming a Presbyterian minister, was described by a Washington journalist as "the happy Puritan".

== Early life ==
William McChesney Martin Jr. was born in St. Louis to William McChesney Martin and Rebecca Woods. Martin's connection to the Federal Reserve was forged through his family heritage. In 1913, Martin's father was summoned by President Woodrow Wilson and Senator Carter Glass to help write the Federal Reserve Act that would establish the Federal Reserve System on December 23 of that year. His father later served as a governor and then president of the Federal Reserve Bank of St. Louis.

Martin graduated from Yale University, where his formal education was in English and Latin rather than finance. However, he still maintained an intense interest in business through his father. His first job after graduation was at the St. Louis brokerage firm of A. G. Edwards & Sons, where he became a full partner after only two years. From there, Martin's rapid rise in the financial world landed him in 1931 a seat on the New York Stock Exchange (NYSE), just two years after the Wall Street crash of 1929 at the outset of the Great Depression. Martin pursued graduate study in Economics at Columbia University from 1931 to 1937; however, he did not receive a degree. During the early part of that decade, Martin's work towards increasing regulation of the stock market led to his election to the NYSE's board of governors in 1935. There, he worked with the U.S. Securities and Exchange Commission (SEC) to reestablish confidence in the stock market and prevent future crashes. He eventually became president of the New York Stock Exchange at age 31, leading newspapers to label him the "boy wonder of Wall Street." During his presidency, Martin worked with the SEC on regulatory measures for the stock exchange.

During World War II he was drafted into the United States Army as a private and rose to the rank of colonel. While in the service, he supervised the disposal of raw materials on the Munitions Allocation Board. He was also a liaison between the Army and Congress, as well as the supervisor of the lend-lease program with the Soviet Union.

== Career ==
=== Director of the Export-Import Bank ===
Martin's return to civilian life was also a return to the financial world, but this time it was in the Federal government. Harry S. Truman, a fellow Democrat, appointed Martin director of the Export-Import Bank, which he operated for three years (1946–1949). It was at this institution that he was publicly viewed as a "hard banker." He insisted that loans be sound, secure investments; on that principle he opposed the State Department on multiple occasions for making loans that he saw as being politically motivated. On those grounds he would not permit the Export-Import Bank to be used as a fund for international relief.

Martin left the Export-Import bank when he was summoned to the Treasury to serve as assistant secretary for monetary affairs. Martin served at the Treasury for about two years when its conflict with the Federal Reserve Board reached its climax. During the period immediately preceding the final negotiations with the Fed, Secretary of the Treasury John W. Snyder was hospitalized. In this situation, Martin became the chief negotiator for the Treasury. From the Treasury's perspective, Martin was a valuable representative, for he had a thorough understanding of the Federal Reserve System and of financial markets. Furthermore, he was viewed as an ally of Truman, who strongly opposed the Fed's independence. During negotiations, Martin re-established communication between the Treasury and Fed, which had been forbidden by Snyder.

=== Chairman of the Federal Reserve Board ===
With Robert Rouse, Woodlief Thomas, and Winfield Riefler of the Fed, Martin negotiated the 1951 Accord. The Federal Open Market Committee (FOMC) and Secretary Snyder accepted the Accord, and it was approved by both institutions. The chairman of the Board of Governors at the time of ratification was Thomas B. McCabe (1893–1982), who would officially resign from his position just six days after the statement of the Accord was released. The Truman Administration viewed McCabe's resignation as an opportunity to influence Federal Reserve leadership. Truman appointed Martin to serve as the next chairman of the Board of Governors, and the Senate approved his appointment on March 21, 1951.

Martin served as chair of the Federal Reserve from April 2, 1951, to January 30, 1970, under five presidents. He was able to pursue independent monetary policies while still paying heed to the desires of various presidential administrations. Martin's monetary policies aimed at achieving low inflation and economic stability through a comprehensive analysis of multiple economic indicators (an example of oversimplification) and instead made policy decisions by examining a wide array of economic data. As chairman, he institutionalized this strategy in the proceedings of the FOMC, gathering the opinions of all governors and presidents within the System before making decisions. As a result, his decisions were often supported by unanimous votes on the FOMC. The task of the Federal Reserve, he famously said, is "to take away the punch bowl just as the party gets going," that is, raise interest rates just when the economy reaches peak activity after a recession.

Martin was designated as administrator of the Emergency Stabilization Agency, an initiative established by President Dwight D. Eisenhower in 1958 that would serve in the event of a national emergency, and that became known as the Eisenhower Ten.

After the presidential election of 1960, Republican Party candidate Richard Nixon blamed his defeat on Martin's tight-money policies.

From 1955 to 1973, Martin was variously chair of the Board of Trustees and Acting President of Berry College.

Martin was elected to the American Academy of Arts and Sciences in 1963 and the American Philosophical Society in 1972.

In 1966, he underwent successful prostate surgery.

Martin was often viewed as a key decision-maker at the Fed, although some have debated the extent of his influence. Throughout his tenure, he defended the right of the Fed to take actions that would sometimes conflict with presidential goals. He regularly asserted that the Fed is responsible to the US Congress and not to the White House. Richard Nixon anticipated Martin's resignation at the beginning of his administration in 1969, but Martin chose to remain in his post. Pursuing a tight-money policy to suppress inflation, by mid-1969 Martin ran afoul of Nixon's concern that the Fed was in danger of pushing the nation into economic recession, a belief that had been publicly stated by conservative economist Milton Friedman. At a White House meeting on October 15, 1969, Nixon confronted Martin over his tight-money policy, but Martin declined to yield. Two days later, the White House announced that Arthur Burns would replace Martin as chairman of the Federal Reserve on Feb. 1, 1970.

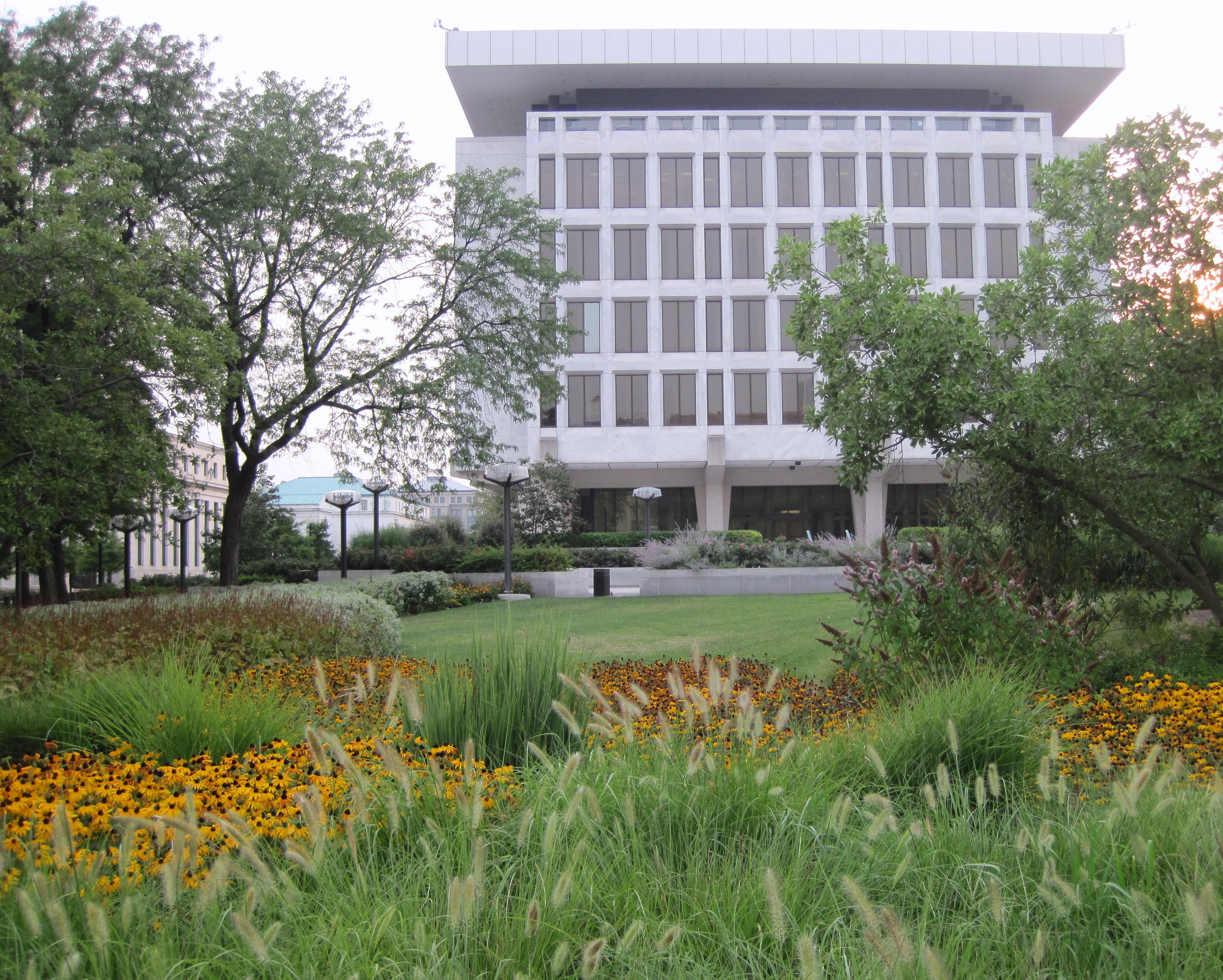
The 1974 William McChesney Martin Jr. Federal Reserve Board Building

Martin ended his tenure as chairman of the Board of Governors on January 30, 1970. After his tenure at the Federal Reserve, Martin held directorships in various corporations and nonprofit organizations, such as the Rockefeller Brothers Fund.

Martin was an avid tennis player who played tennis nearly every day on the tennis court located outside the Federal Reserve Board Building in Washington, D.C. Martin would go on to serve as president of the National Tennis Foundation and chair of the International Tennis Hall of Fame after retiring from the Federal Reserve.

He died of a heart attack at his home in Washington, D.C., on July 28, 1998, at the age of 91.

== Legacy ==
The 1974 Federal Reserve Annex next to the Eccles Building is named for him.

== See also ==
- History of the United States (1945–1964)
- History of the United States (1964–1980)
- Bretton Woods system

Business positions
Preceded by Charles R. Gay	President of the New York Stock Exchange; 1938–1941	Succeeded by Emil Schram
Government offices
Preceded by Thomas B. McCabe	Member of the Federal Reserve Board of Governors; 1951–1970	Succeeded by Arthur F. Burns
Preceded by Thomas B. McCabe	Chairman of the Federal Reserve; 1951–1970	Succeeded by Arthur F. Burns
