= Edward H. Smith (politician) =

American politician

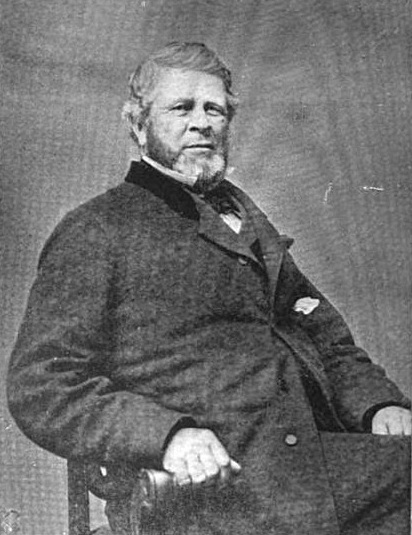

Member of the U.S. House of Representatives from New York's 1st district
- In office March 4, 1861 – March 3, 1863
- Preceded by: Luther C. Carter
- Succeeded by: Henry G. Stebbins

Personal details
- Born: May 5, 1809 Smithtown, New York, US
- Died: August 7, 1885 (aged 76) Smithtown, New York, US
- Party: Democratic

Edward Henry Smith (May 5, 1809 – August 7, 1885) was an American politician who served one term as a U.S. representative from New York during the American Civil War.

== Biography ==
Born in Smithtown, Long Island, New York, Smith attended private schools. He engaged in agricultural pursuits. He served as Justice of the Peace in the township of Smithtown 1833–1843, assessor 1840–1843, and supervisor 1856–1860.

=== Congress ===
Smith was elected as a Democrat to the Thirty-seventh Congress (March 4, 1861 – March 3, 1863) defeating incumbent Luther C. Carter in the election.

=== Later career and death ===
He was not a candidate for renomination in 1862. He resumed farming in Suffolk County, New York.

He died in Smithtown, New York on August 7, 1885. He was interred in St. James' Protestant Episcopal Cemetery, St. James, Long Island, New York.

U.S. House of Representatives
Preceded by Luther C. Carter	Member of the U.S. House of Representatives from New York's 1st congressional district 1861–1863	Succeeded by Henry G. Stebbins
