= Frank K. Sturgis =

American banker (1847–1932)

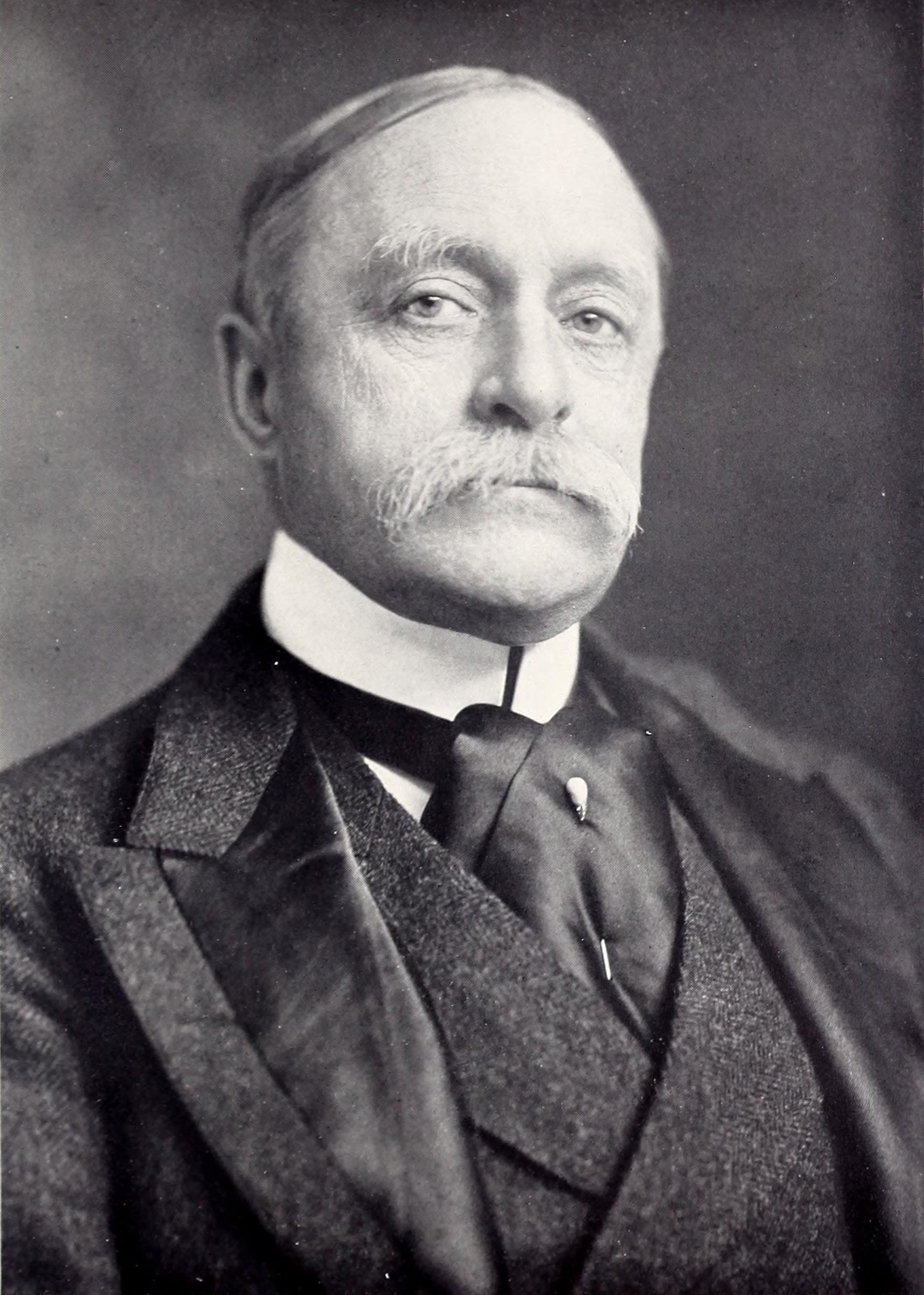

President of the New York Stock Exchange
- In office 1892–1894
- Preceded by: Watson B. Dickerman
- Succeeded by: Francis L. Eames

Personal details
- Born: Frank Knight Sturgis; September 13, 1847 New York City, New York, U.S.
- Died: June 15, 1932 (aged 84) New York City, New York, U.S.
- Resting place: Island Cemetery, Newport, Rhode Island
- Spouse: Florence Lydig (m. 1872; died 1922)
- Relations: Thomas Sturgis (brother); William F. Sturgis (grandfather); Ellen Sturgis Hooper (aunt); Marian Hooper Adams (cousin)
- Parent(s): William Sturgis Jr. Elizabeth Hinckley Sturgis

Frank Knight Sturgis (September 13, 1847 – June 15, 1932) was an American banker who served as president of the New York Stock Exchange and became a prominent member of New York society during the Gilded Age.

== Early life ==
Sturgis was born in New York City on September 13, 1847. He was the son of William Sturgis Jr. (1806–1895) and Elizabeth Knight (née Hinckley) Sturgis (1809–1849). Among his siblings was Annie Sturgis Freeman, William Sturgis (who married Anna Sprague), and Thomas Sturgis (who married Helen Rutgers), who became a rancher in Wyoming. His father was a prominent merchant of New York, Boston and London and his mother was from an old Yarmouth, Massachusetts family.

Sturgis traced his earliest American ancestry back to Edward Sturgis, who was born in England in 1613, and arrived in America in 1630. His paternal grandfather was William F. Sturgis, a Boston merchant in the China trade, the California hide trade and the Maritime fur trade. His paternal aunt was Ellen Sturgis Hooper, a Transcendentalist poet who was the wife of Dr. Robert William Hooper (and the mother of society hostess Marian Hooper Adams, the wife of Henry Adams of the Adams political family). His paternal uncle was Russell Sturgis (the head of Baring Brothers in Londong and the father of Boston architect John Hubbard Sturgis and novelists Julian and Howard Sturgis).

He was educated in the public schools in New York before beginning his business career.

== Career ==
At the age of sixteen, Sturgis joined a mercantile firm as a clerk. In January 1868, he joined the banking firm of Capron, Strong & Company, quickly becoming a partner of the firm in 1869 at the age of twenty-two. The original firm became known as Work, Strong & Company in 1871 and in 1896, it became Strong, Stugis & Company.

On January 12, 1869, he was admitted to membership in the New York Stock Exchange, serving on the governing committee (since 1876) and later becoming its vice president. In 1892, he was elected as president of the exchange. While serving as president, "it was largely at his suggestion and through his labors, in association with other leading financiers, that the Clearing House was established." He was re-elected the following year and served during the Panic of 1893 until 1894. Sturgis testified before the Pujo Committee in the U.S. House of Representatives, set up to investigate the so-called "money trust" and, reportedly, gave "quick and incisive replies to the severe examination of Samuel Untermyer".

In 1914, Sturgis, who was known as "the Beau Brummel of his day", was honored with a resolution from its members praising his record of service and expressing their gratitude for his part in expanding the Exchange and upgrading its standards. He retired from active business at the age of seventy-two in 1919. Upon his death in 1932, the governing committee of the Exchange adopted a resolution praising his services, stating:

"The death of Frank K. Sturgis has deeply moved those members of the New York Stock Exchange who remember the closing years of the nineteenth century. The Exchange at that time was a local institution dealing mainly in American railroad securities and had not yet developed into the great world market of today. In those earlier years, when the foundations were being laid for the present international market in New York, Mr. Sturgis was a conspicuous leader both as president and as governor of the Exchange. His clear judgment, his high ideals, as well as his charming personality, gave him a unique and commanding position among his fellow-members."

=== Society life ===
In 1892, both Sturgis and his wife were both included in Ward McAllister's "Four Hundred", purported to be an index of New York's best families, published in The New York Times. Conveniently, 400 was the number of people that could fit into Mrs. Astor's ballroom. He was a member of the Union Club, the Knickerbocker Club (serving as vice president), and the New York Yacht Club. He was also a founder and president (in 1911) of the Metropolitan Club in New York. In Newport, he served as president of the Newport Casino and was a director of the Redwood Library and president of the Newport Historical Society. Sturgis was close friends with James Gordon Bennett Jr., fellow sportsman who was the publisher of the New York Herald.

Sturgis, a well-known sportsman, was a member of the Coaching Club and served as its president in 1916. He was a member of the Board of Directors of the Coney Island Jockey Club, operators of the Sheepshead Bay Race Track. He bred horses and served as president of the National Horse Show Associations, Madison Square Garden (from 1891 until it dissolved in 1912), and the American Society for the Prevention of Cruelty to Animals.

== Personal life ==
On October 16, 1872, Sturgis was married to Florence Lydig (d. 1922). She was the daughter of Philip Mesier Lydig, the family that owned the land that subsequently became the Bronx Park; the park now contains the New York Botanical Garden. Florence and Frank, who did not have any children together, resided at 17 East 51st Street in New York, a classical townhouse designed in 1905 by prominent architect Ogden Codman, Jr., another cousin of Sturgis. The townhouse was built of limestone, with giant fluted pilasters, and was similar to a house designed by Robert Adam at 20 St James's Square in London.

The Sturgis' owned a summer home in Lenox, Massachusetts known as Clipston Grange, where Frank bred horses. The home was originally built in 1870 in the village, but was moved to Kemble Street in 1893, shortly before the Sturgis' bought it in 1894 and had it enlarged into a colonial revival mansion.

In Newport, they owned a villa known as Faxon Lodge on Cliff Avenue. Faxon Lodge was designed for the Sturgis' in 1903, also by Codman. The home was purchased by former U.S. Ambassador to Mexico, Belgium, and Italy, Henry P. Fletcher in 1936. Today, the home is owned by Salve Regina University and is known as Conley Hall.

His wife died in New York in March 1922 and was buried at Island Cemetery in Newport, Rhode Island. Upon his wife's death, in her honor, he endowed the Florence Lydig Sturgis Endowment Fund for the purpose of purchasing birds for the Zoological Park collection of the New York Zoological Society. In her will, she left the Lenox estate to Frank. After four years of near invalidism, Sturgis died on June 15, 1932, also at his home in New York City. After a funeral at Grace Church which was officiated by the church's rector, Rev. Dr. Stanley C. Hughes, he was buried beside his wife at Island Cemetery in Newport.

=== Estate ===
In his will, he left $55,000 in cash bequests to four public institutions, $1,300,000 to his relatives, and the residue of his multi-million dollar estate to the Winifred Masterson Burke Relief Foundation. In October 1932, 210 items from his estate were auctioned off including twelve paintings by English artists such as J.F. Herring, John Boultbee, Harry Hall, Charles Cooper Henderson, and Dean Wolstenholme.

Business positions
Preceded by Watson B. Dickerman	President of the New York Stock Exchange; 1892 – 1894	Succeeded by Francis L. Eames
