= Charles R. Gay =

American banker

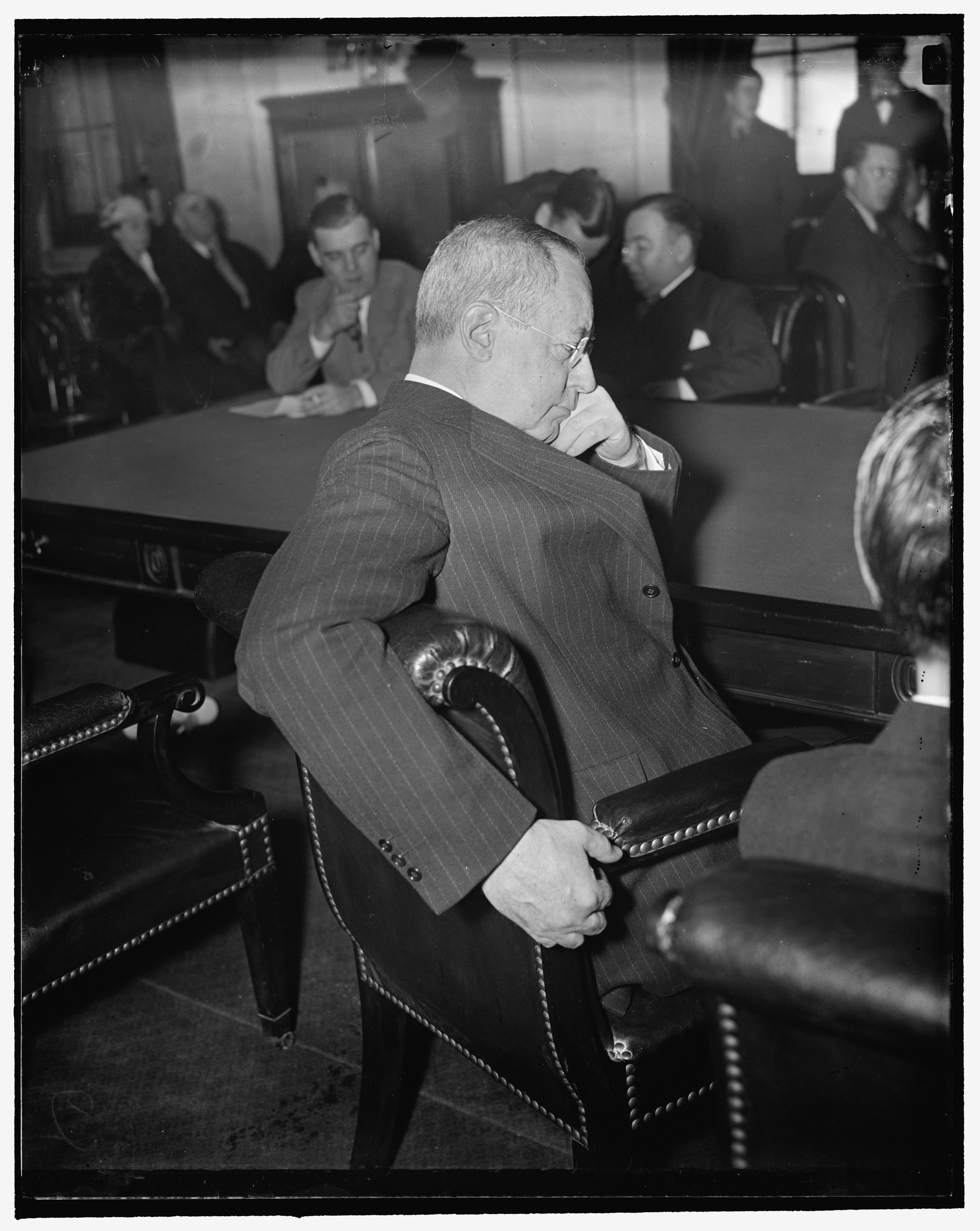
- Gay at Senate hearing in Washington, 1937

President of the New York Stock Exchange
- In office May 1935 – May 1938
- Preceded by: Richard Whitney
- Succeeded by: William McChesney Martin

Personal details
- Born: Charles Richard Gay; September 14, 1875 Brooklyn, New York, U.S.
- Died: March 24, 1946 (aged 70) Brooklyn, New York, U.S.
- Spouse: Jennie Campbell Bowdish (m. 1898)
- Children: William Campbell Gay
- Education: Brooklyn Polytechnic Institute

Charles Richard Gay (September 14, 1875 – March 23, 1946) was an American banker who served as president of the New York Stock Exchange.

== Early life ==
Gay was born in Brooklyn on September 14, 1875. He was a son of Charles Abram Gay and Anna Mitchell (née Campbell) Gay. His younger brother was Robert Malcolm Gay, a prominent English professor.

He was educated at Brooklyn Public School 35 before attending Brooklyn Polytechnic Institute (today, part of the New York University Tandon School of Engineering).

== Career ==
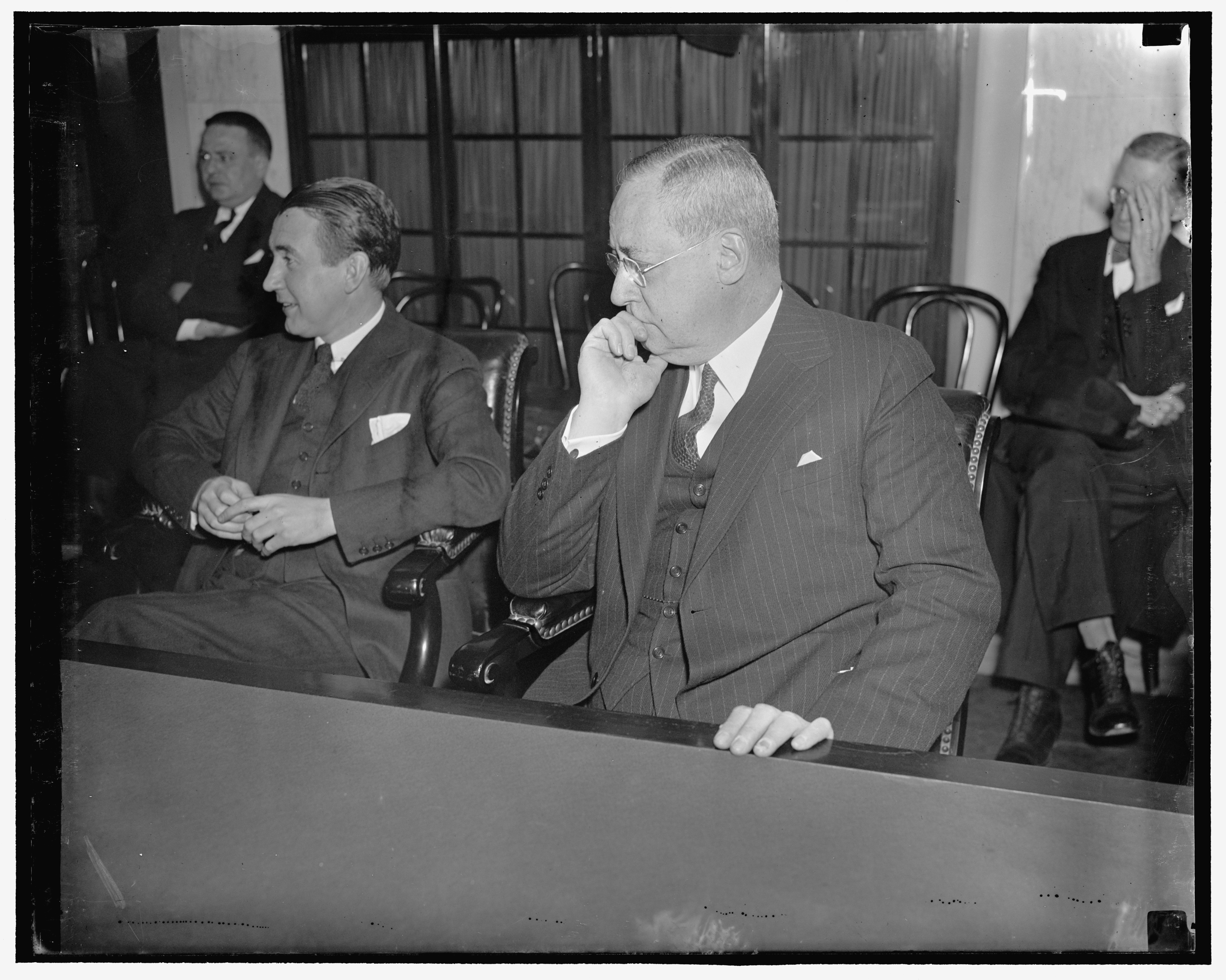
Gay at Senate hearing in Washington listening to testimony during hearing of the Senate Railroad Financing Committee, 1937.

After "engaging in the fire insurance, banking and wholesale coal businesses," he purchased his seat and became a member of the New York Stock Exchange in 1911, four years later forming the firm of Gay & Goepel. In 1919, he merged his firm (then known as Charles R. Gay & Co.) with Whitehouse & Co., was reportedly the oldest firm on the Exchange.

In 1935, when he was senior partner at Whitehouse & Co. (with offices on the 20th floor of 1 Wall Street), he was elected president of the Exchange, succeeding Richard Whitney. Gay served three terms as president, retiring in May 1938. He was president during a trying time for the Exchange and financial markets and often traveled to Washington, D.C. to meet with the Securities and Exchange Commission and to participate with Senate inquiries.

After his tenure as president of the Exchange, he became the head of Winthrop, Whitehouse & Co., a longtime securities firm established in 1828. At the time of his death, he was serving on the board of directors of the Dime Savings Bank.

== Personal life ==
In 1898, he married Jennie Campbell Bowdish, a daughter of the Rev. Wellesley Wellington Bowdish and Jennie Elizabeth (née Campbell) Bowdish. They lived at 440 East 19th Street in the Flatbush section of Brooklyn. Together, Jennie and Charles were the parents of one son:

- William Campbell Gay, who was also a member of the New York Stock Exchange and who lived in Halesite on Long Island. He married Evelyn W. Sherman.

He was a trustee of the Brooklyn Methodist Hospital and St. Mark's Methodist Episcopal Church of Brooklyn and a member of the board of Dickinson College in Carlisle, Pennsylvania, the Flatbush Boys Club and the YMCA

He died at the Methodist Hospital in Brooklyn on March 23, 1946. A memorial was held for Gay at Trinity Church in Manhattan.

Business positions
Preceded by Richard Whitney	President of the New York Stock Exchange; 1935 – 1938	Succeeded by William McChesney Martin
