= Francis L. Eames =

American banker and historian

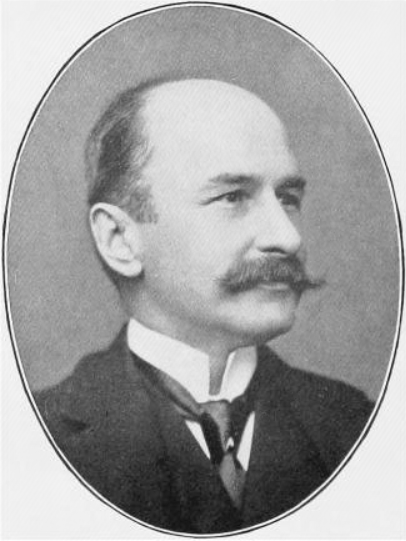

President of the New York Stock Exchange
- In office 1894–1898
- Preceded by: Frank K. Sturgis
- Succeeded by: Rudolph Keppler

Personal details
- Born: Francis Luther Eames; June 29, 1844 Fall River, Massachusetts, U.S.
- Died: November 10, 1912 (aged 68) Brooklyn, New York, U.S.
- Spouse: Sarah Wright (m. 1875; died 1898)
- Children: 2

Francis Luther Eames (June 29, 1844 – November 10, 1912) was an American banker and historian who served as president of the New York Stock Exchange.

== Early life ==
Eames was born in Fall River, Massachusetts on June 29, 1844. He was a son of Asa Eames Jr. (1809–1885) and, his first wife, Harriet (née Seabury) Eames (1812–1852). After the death of his mother in 1852, his father remarried to Rebekah Potter in 1854.

His paternal grandparents were Asa Eames and Anna (née Havens) Eames.

== Career ==
After receiving his education in the schools of Fall River, he began his career as a clerk in several banking houses, including L. P. Morton & Co. (the firm founded by former U.S. Vice President Levi P. Morton). In 1870, he formed Eames & Moore, a brokerage partnership with H. Ramsdell Moore, becoming senior member of the firm in 1885.

In 1866, he became a member of the New York Stock Exchange and was elected a member of the Governing Committee of the Exchange in 1879. In 1892, he devised and put in operation the Clearing House of the Exchange. In recognition of the value of the Clearing House, the members of the Exchange presented Eames with a " handsome silver service." In 1894, he was elected president of the Exchange and served in that role for four years. The same year he assumed the presidency from Frank K. Sturgis, he authored History of the New York Stock Exchange, which was published in 1895.

In December 1902, he announced that he would retire from active business on January 1, 1903, but served as a trustee of the Brooklyn Savings Bank, the Long Island Historical Society, the Stock Exchange Gratuity Fund, and a director of the Brooklyn Hospital. He was also a member of the Sons of the Revolution, the Society of Colonial Wars, the Chamber of Commerce of New York and the Hamilton Club of Brooklyn.

== Personal life ==
On October 1, 1875, Eames was married to Sarah Wright (1847–1898), a daughter of William Wright and Emily (née Carpenter) Wright. Together, they lived in Brooklyn, had a summer home in Kennebunkport, Maine, and were the parents of two daughters:

- Ethel Eames (1877–1917), who married Rev. Edward Frederick Sanderson in June 1912. Sanderson was pastor of the Congregational Church of the Pilgrims in Brooklyn Heights and one of the founders of Goodwill Industries.
- Helen Eames (1879–1883), who died young.

Eames died at his home, 125 Remsen Street in Brooklyn on November 10, 1912.

=== Descendants ===
Through his daughter Ethel, he was a grandfather of David Eames Sanderson (1915–1970).

Business positions
Preceded by Frank K. Sturgis	President of the New York Stock Exchange; 1894 – 1898	Succeeded by Rudolph Keppler
