= William L. Bull =

American banker (1844–1914)

President of the New York Stock Exchange
- In office 1888–1890
- Preceded by: James D. Smith
- Succeeded by: Watson B. Dickerman

Personal details
- Born: William Lanman Bull; August 23, 1844 New York City, U.S.
- Died: January 2, 1914 (aged 69) New York City, U.S.
- Party: Republican
- Spouse: Sara Newton Worthington (m. 1871)
- Children: 3
- Education: College of the City of New York

William Lanman Bull Sr. (August 23, 1844 – January 2, 1914) was an American banker who served as president of the New York Stock Exchange.

== Early life ==
Bull was born on August 23, 1844, in New York City. He was the seventh child and youngest son of Frederic Bull and Mary Huntington (née Lanman) Bull. Among his siblings were Elizabeth Atwater Bull (wife of merchant Augustus Oscar van Lennep), Frederic Bull, and Anna Chester Bull.

His paternal grandparents were Elizabeth (née Atwater) Bull and Jireh Bull (a descendant of Rhode Island Governor Henry Bull) and his maternal grandparents were Peter Lanman and Abigail (née Trumbull) Lanman (a sister of U.S. Representative and Connecticut governor Joseph Trumbull). Through his mother, he was a first cousin of scholar Charles Rockwell Lanman.

After receiving a preparatory education, he studied at the College of the City of New York, where he graduated in 1864.

== Career ==
After graduation, Bull began his business career by joining Edward Sweet & Co., a banking house founded in 1854 (with offices at the southwest corner of Wall and Broad Street) where his brother-in-law was the senior partner. In 1867, he became a partner, a position he held uninterruptedly for over forty-five years. The prominent firm became known as "a Vanderbilt and Rockefeller house" and E. H. Harriman did business for the firm when he was a broker. Bull served as a director of several companies, including the Northern Pacific Railway, the East Tennessee, Virginia and Georgia Railway, the New York, Susquehanna and Western Railway, and the Atchison, Topeka and Santa Fe Railway.

In 1869, Bull joined the New York Stock Exchange and was "one of fifty brokers who secured his membership for $1,000 a piece when the Stock Exchange was consolidated with the gold board." He later became a member of the Exchange's board of governors and in May 1888, he was elected president of the Exchange, and served two terms until he was succeeded by Watson B. Dickerman in 1890.

He retired from business in 1908. Shortly after his death, Edward Sweet & Co., which was then at 34 Pine Street, was dissolved and its business taken over by Chandler Brothers & Co. of New York and Philadelphia. Sweet partner Lewis E. Waring became a partner in Chandler, although his fellow partners Frederic Bull (his son) and Louis Livingston (his daughter-in-law's brother) did not.

== Personal life ==
On February 15, 1871, Bull was married to Sara Newton "Tasie" Worthington. Tasie was the daughter of prominent businessman and inventor Henry Rossiter Worthington and Sara Jane (née Newton) Worthington (a daughter of Admiral Newtown of the U.S. Navy). Together, they resided at 805 Fifth Avenue and were the parents of:

- Frederic Bull (1871–1948), who married his second cousin, Mary Helen Robinson in 1895. They divorced on December 2, 1926, and six days later he married Susan Fish Dresser (1890–1929), daughter of D. LeRoy Dresser and niece of Edith Stuyvesant Gerry. After her death, he married Corinne (née Howell) Strange (1880–1962), a widow of Albert Bruton Strange, in 1938.
- Henry Worthington Bull (1874–1958), who married Maud Maria Livingston (1875–1962), a daughter of Robert Cambridge Livingston and Maria (née Whitney) Livingston, in 1904. Her niece, Phyllis Livingston Potter, was the wife of Fred Astaire.
- William Lanman Bull Jr. (1880–1912), who married Matilda E. Heppenheimer, a daughter of Otto Heppenheimer, in 1904.

He was a member of the Chamber of Commerce, the Society of Mayflower Descendants, the American Museum of Natural History, the Metropolitan Museum of Art, the New-York Historical Society, the Sons of the American Revolution, the New York Zoological Society. He was affiliated with the Century Association, Grolier Club, Union Club, Metropolitan Club, Republican Club, Ardsley Club, Church Club, City Club, Midday Club, Alpha Delta Phi, Manhattan Society, and the Phi Beta Kappa honorary fraternity.

Bull died of heart disease on January 2, 1914, at his residence in New York. After a funeral at Grace Church, he was buried in the family vault in Green-Wood Cemetery in Brooklyn.

Business positions
Preceded by James D. Smith	President of the New York Stock Exchange; 1888–1890	Succeeded by Watson B. Dickerman
