= James Maurice =

American lawyer and politician (1814–1884)

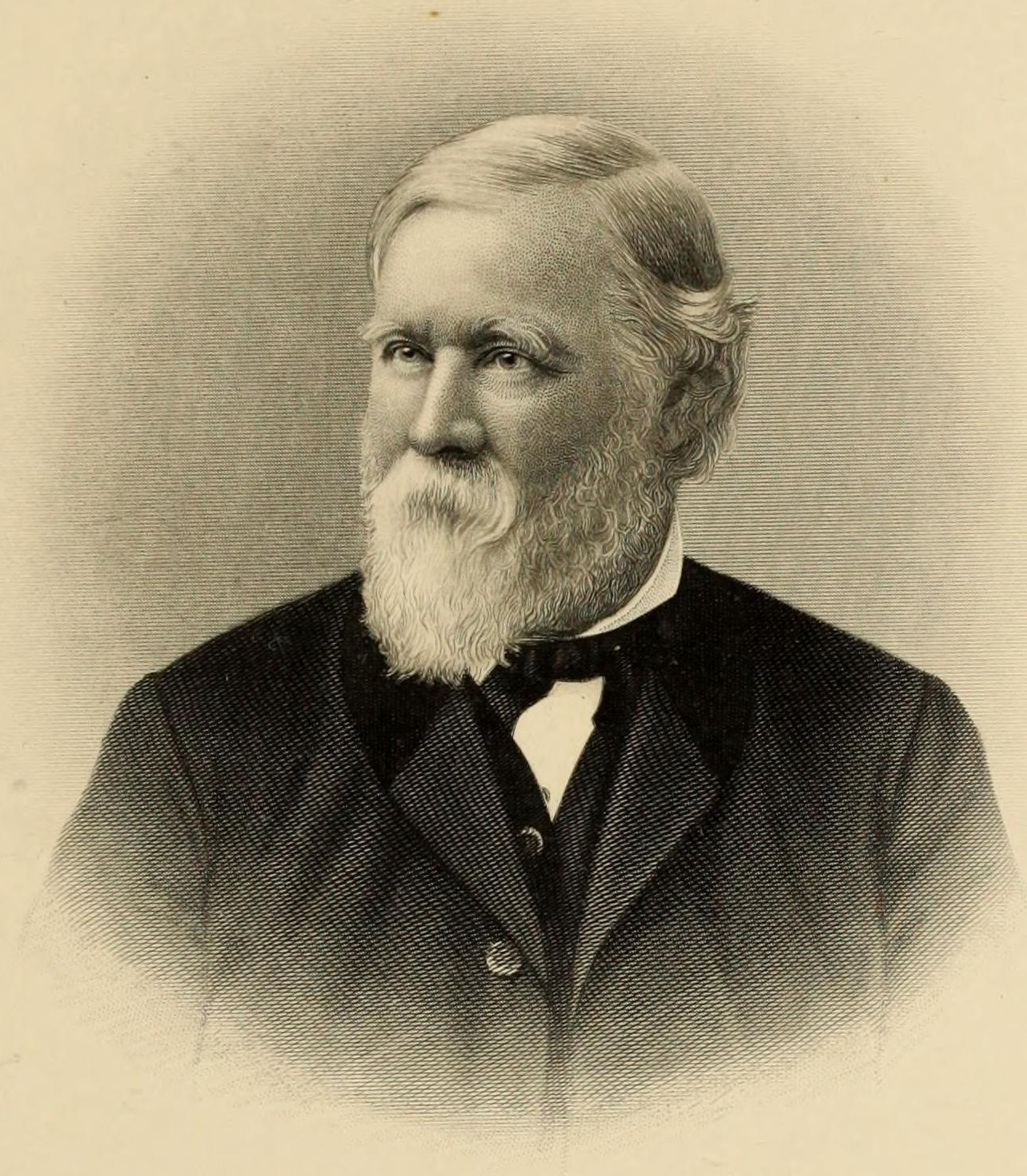

Member of the U.S. House of Representatives from New York's 1st district
- In office March 4, 1853 – March 3, 1855
- Preceded by: John G. Floyd
- Succeeded by: William Valk

Member of the New York State Assembly from the Queens County, 2nd district
- In office 1866–1866
- Preceded by: Charles McNeil
- Succeeded by: William B. Wilson

Member of the New York State Assembly from the Queens County district
- In office 1851–1851
- Preceded by: Joseph S. Snedeker
- Succeeded by: Sylvanus S. Smith

Personal details
- Born: November 7, 1814 New York City, New York, U.S.
- Died: August 4, 1884 (aged 69) Maspeth, Queens, New York City, U.S.
- Resting place: Mount Olivet Cemetery, Queens
- Party: Democratic
- Occupation: Lawyer, politician

James Maurice (November 7, 1814 – August 4, 1884) was an American lawyer and politician who served one term as a U.S. representative from New York from 1853 to 1855. He also served in the New York State Assembly in 1851 and again in 1866.

== Early life ==
Maurice was born on November 7, 1814, in New York City. He attended Broad Street Academy and became a clerk in a law office at the age of twelve. He studied law, was admitted to the bar in 1835, and began practicing law in Maspeth.

== Political career ==
A Democrat, Maurice was a member of the New York State Assembly (Queens County) in 1851. He was a delegate to the Democratic state conventions of 1851, 1853, and 1856.

=== Congress ===
Maurice was elected as a Democrat to the 33rd United States Congress, holding office from March 4, 1853, to March 3, 1855. After his term, he resumed the practice of law and declined the nomination as justice of the New York Supreme Court in 1865.

He was again a member of the State Assembly (Queens County, 2nd District) in 1866.

== Death ==
Maurice died in Maspeth on August 4, 1884, at the age of 69. He was interred in Mount Olivet Cemetery in Queens.

New York State Assembly
Preceded by John S. Snedeker	New York State Assembly; Queens County; 1851	Succeeded by Sylvanus S. Smith
Preceded by Charles McNeil	New York State Assembly; Queens County, 2nd District; 1866	Succeeded by William B. Wilson
U.S. House of Representatives
Preceded by John G. Floyd	Member of the U.S. House of Representatives from New York's 1st congressional district 1853–1855	Succeeded by William Valk
