= Watson B. Dickerman =

American banker (1846–1923)

President of the New York Stock Exchange
- In office 1890–1892
- Preceded by: William L. Bull
- Succeeded by: Frank K. Sturgis

Personal details
- Born: Watson Bradley Dickerman; January 4, 1846 Mount Carmel, Connecticut, U.S.
- Died: April 5, 1923 (aged 77) New York City, U.S.
- Spouse(s): Martha Elizabeth Swift (m. 1869; died 1908) Florence Elaine Calkin (m. 1917)
- Parent(s): Ezra Dickerman; Sarah Jones Dickerman
- Education: Williston Seminary

Watson Bradley Dickerman (January 4, 1846 – April 5, 1923) was an American banker who founded Dominick & Dickerman and served as president of the New York Stock Exchange.

== Early life ==
Dickerman was born on January 4, 1846, in Mount Carmel, Connecticut. He was the ninth and youngest child of son of Ezra Dickerman (1800–1860) and Sarah (née Jones) Dickerman (1806–1890). Among his siblings were brothers George Sherwood, Henry Street and Ezra Day Dickerman.

He was educated at Williston Seminary, a prep school established in 1841 in Easthampton, Massachusetts.

== Career ==
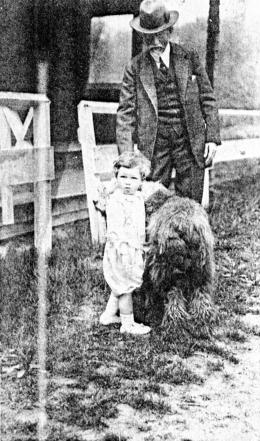
Watson Dickerson

Dickerman began his finance and banking career as a young employee and trainee of Jacob Bunn in the J. Bunn Bank of Springfield, Illinois, before coming to New York City in 1868 and joining the Open Board of Brokers, which was consolidated with the New York Stock Exchange in 1869.

On June 15, 1870, he formed the stock brokerage firm of Dominick & Dickerman with Chicago-born William Gayer Dominick. Dominick had purchased membership on the New York Stock Exchange in 1869 where he met Dickerman. Dominick's brothers, George and Bayard Dominick, also joined the Exchange and became partners in the firm. In 1889, the firm opened its first branch in Cincinnati where it was one of only two exchange members.

From 1889 to 1891, Dickerson was Receiver of the Norfolk Southern Railway, until its reorganization in 1891 when he began serving as its president from 1891 to 1899. He also served as a director of the Long Island Loan & Trust Company.

In 1890, Dickerman left his firm when he was elected to succeed William L. Bull as president of the New York Stock Exchange. He served as president of the Exchange from 1890 to 1892, after which Frank K. Sturgis became president and he was again elected a Governor of the Exchange. In 1892, Dickerman returned to the firm and three years later, his co-founder William Dominick died of typhoid fever in 1895. In 1899, William C. Sheldon & Co. and Dickerman's firm provided financing for an iron and steel corporate combine called Republic Iron & Steel Company, which absorbed the Springfield Iron Company run by John Whitfield Bunn, brother of Dickerman's Springfield mentor. Both brothers had been personal friends of Abraham Lincoln. Dickerman retired from active business life in 1909.

He also served as president of the New York Zoological Society, where he served on the board of managers for fifteen years and was a member of the Executive Committee. He was also a member of the Metropolitan Club, the Union Club, the Century Association, and the Brook and Riding Clubs.

== Personal life ==
On February 18, 1869, Dickerman was married to Martha Elizabeth Swift (1847–1908), a daughter of Samuel Swift and Mary (née Phelps) Swift of Brooklyn. Together, they were the parents of:

- Watson Bradley Dickerman (1871–1873), who died young.

After the death of his first wife, he remarried to Florence Elaine Calkin at the Grace Church chantry on April 12, 1917. Florence was a daughter of Freeman Brant Calkin of Yonkers, and according to their New York Times wedding announcement, "Dickerman is many years the senior of his wife." Together, Watson and Florence were the parents of:

- Watson Bradley Dickerman Jr. (1918–1955), a Harvard graduate who became an assistant vice president at J.P. Morgan & Co. before his death at age 37 in 1955. He married Mary McBurney Philbin, a granddaughter of the New York County District Attorney Eugene A. Philbin. Her sister was the first wife of journalist and political activist Blair Clark.

After his retirement in 1909, he devoted his time to breeding "trotting horses and Guernsey cattle" at Hillandale Farm, his country place on Weaver Street, Quaker Ridge in Scarsdale, New York. He first bought the property in 1884 and over the years, added to it until it reached nearly 500 acres in Mamaroneck and New Rochelle.

Dickerman died at 998 Fifth Avenue, his home on Manhattan's Upper East Side (an Italian Renaissance Palazzo-style luxury cooperative building designed by McKim, Mead & White and built by James T. Lee), on April 5, 1923. His funeral was held at Grace Episcopal Church in New York. After leaving $20,000 each to the New York Zoological Society and the Home for Incurables, the remainder of his roughly $5,000,000 estate was left to his widow and surviving son. The inheritance tax was $274,153, "the largest inheritance tax levied upon a Westchester estate in many months." Two codicils revoked bequests made totaling more than $500,000 to relatives and charity. His son died in 1955 and his widow died in 1963.

Business positions
| Preceded by William L. Bull | President of the New York Stock Exchange; 1890 – 1892 | Succeeded by Frank K. Sturgis |
