= William Valk =

American politician

Member of the U.S. House of Representatives from New York's 1st district
- In office March 4, 1855 – March 3, 1857
- Preceded by: James Maurice
- Succeeded by: John A. Searing

Personal details
- Born: October 12, 1806 Charleston, South Carolina, US
- Died: September 20, 1879 (aged 72) Washington, D.C., US
- Party: Know Nothing

William Weightman Valk (October 12, 1806 – September 20, 1879) was a soldier in the American Civil War and a U.S. Congressman.

Valk earned a degree in medicine, graduating from the University of South Carolina at Columbia in 1830. He opened a practice in Connecticut. He joined the Navy during the Mexican–American War and became chief surgeon on the USS Constellation. Valk joined the California Gold Rush in 1849 and, upon failure, opened a practice on Long Island. From March 4, 1855, to March 3, 1857, Valk served in New York's 1st District in the United States House of Representatives.

Finally settled in Flushing, New York, and continued the practice of medicine until elected to Congress. He was elected as a candidate serving in New York's 1st District, as a member of the American Party to the Thirty-fourth Congress (March 4, 1855 – March 3, 1857). He was an unsuccessful candidate for reelection. Upon the breakout of Civil War, he volunteered as chief surgeon of the 2nd Maryland Infantry Regiment of the Union Army. He later became a pension office clerk in Washington, D.C. He was interred in Flushing Cemetery.

U.S. House of Representatives
Preceded by James Maurice	Member of the U.S. House of Representatives from New York's 1st congressional district 1855–1857	Succeeded by John A. Searing
