= John Willis (New York politician) =

American politician from New York

Member of the New York State Assembly from Queens County
- In office 1846–1846
- Preceded by: Elbert Floyd-Jones
- Succeeded by: Wessel S. Smith

John Willis was an American politician from New York. He served as a member of the New York State Assembly in 1846, representing Queens County.

== Political career ==
Willis was elected to the New York State Assembly and served in the 1846 session, representing Queens County. He was one of the assembly members from Queens County during that session.

== Personal life and death ==
His burial location is unknown.

New York State Assembly
Preceded by Elbert Floyd-Jones	New York State Assembly; Queens County; 1846	Succeeded by Wessel S. Smith
