= Emil Schram =

American businessman (1893–1987)

- Emil Schramm (1939)

President of the New York Stock Exchange
- In office 1941–1951
- Preceded by: William McChesney Martin
- Succeeded by: G. Keith Funston

Personal details
- Born: November 23, 1893 Peru, Indiana, U.S.
- Died: September 18, 1987 (aged 93) Peru, Indiana, U.S.
- Spouse(s): Mabel Miller; Margaret Beauchamp.

Emil Schram (November 23, 1893 – September 18, 1987) was the president of the New York Stock Exchange from 1941 to 1951. In the wake of the Great Depression, Schram helped restore confidence in investment and stocks. Before his appointment, Schram did not own any stocks and had never been a Wall Street trader, making him the first outsider to become president of the exchange in 155 years.

== Early life ==
Schram was born in Peru, Indiana, where he attended local schools through high-school. He was accepted into Harvard and Wharton, but couldn't afford tuition. Instead, he went to work in a timber and coal company with local offices. At age 21 he proved himself to be an effective farm manager, making investment decisions that dramatically increased the output of a local farm under the firms control.,

== Career ==
Schram's early success in farm management led him accept a position as chairman of the National Drainage Association, an agricultural trade group. While working for the Association, Schram applied for loans with the Reconstruction Finance Corporation which was a Depression/New Deal era government corporation tasked with making loans to infrastructure projects and businesses and helping banks resume normal operations.

In 1933, Schram joined the Reconstruction Finance Corporation. In 1939 he became the chairman of the Board of Directors of the RFC. His chairmanship was short lived, however, because less than two years later he was offered the position that would define his career.

In 1941 the New York Stock Exchange was still feeling the effects of the Great Depression. Trade volume was very low, seats were sold cheaper than in previous decades, and the exchange had been the target of political attacks. A selection committee was formed to find a new president, and they selected Schram. Before his appointment, Schram did not own any stocks and had never been a Wall Street trader, making him the first outsider to become president of the exchange in 155 years.

Schram reformed the management structure of the Exchange, removing many of the traditional committees in favor of a top-town approach. He spent $500,000 per year on nationwide advertising programs encouraging the public to hold on to war bonds in an effort to keep small-time investors out of the market. Under Schram's leadership, the NYSE recovered, and public confidence was restored.

=== Later career ===
In 1951, at age 58, Schram retired from the Exchange and returned home to Peru, Indiana. Schram was succeeded by G. Keith Funston. In his later life he remained active in civic organizations including the local council of the Boy Scouts of America and the U.S.O.

== Personal life ==
Emil Schram's first wife was Mabel Miller, with whom he had three sons, Robert Schram, Daniel Schram, and James Schram. Mabel died in 1969, and Schram later married Margaret Beauchamp.

Schram died in 1987 in Peru, Indiana.

== Honors ==
In 1968, Emil Schram was awarded an honorary doctorate from Indiana University, Bloomington.

Business positions
Preceded by William McChesney Martin, Jr.	President of the New York Stock Exchange; 1941 – 1951	Succeeded by G. Keith Funston
