= Robert J. Birnbaum =

American financial executive (1927–2021)

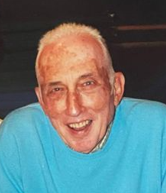

President of the New York Stock Exchange
- In office May 6, 1985 – 1988
- Preceded by: John J. Phelan Jr.
- Succeeded by: Richard Grasso

Personal details
- Born: Robert Jack Birnbaum; September 3, 1927 Bronx, New York, U.S.
- Died: December 23, 2021 (aged 94) Boca Raton, Florida, U.S.
- Spouse(s): Joy E. Birnbaum (d. 1990); Gloria J. Birnbaum
- Occupation: Wall Street executive, attorney

Robert Jack Birnbaum (September 3, 1927 – December 23, 2021) was an American financial executive who served as president of the American Stock Exchange and president of the New York Stock Exchange. He was the president of the NYSE during the Stock market crash of 1987, dubbed Black Monday. He contributed to the adoption of changes in the exchange's operations after the event, including circuit breakers as trade curbing mechanisms during periods of intense volatility. Birnbaum had earlier worked for the Securities Exchange Commission, where his studies recommended the introduction of the forerunner of the modern National Market System in securities trading.

== Early life ==
Birnbaum was born on September 3, 1927, in the Bronx to Beatrice (née Herman) and Joseph Birnbaum. His mother worked various accounting jobs while his father was a furniture store owner. His parents had earlier immigrated to the United States from Russia. Birnbaum studied at the DeWitt Clinton High School and later went to the New York University where he received a Bachelor of Business Administration degree in 1957. He studied law, dividing his time between the University of California, Hastings College of the Law and Georgetown University in Washington, where he would receive his Bachelor of Laws degree in 1962.

== Career ==
=== Early career ===
Birnbaum started his career with the Government Accountability Office, a US federal agency, before joining the Securities and Exchange Commission (SEC) in 1961. During his time at the SEC, he was part of a team that studied securities markets and he specifically focused on sections of the study as it pertained to the Over-the-Counter (OTC) market. The team's report, titled Special Study of Securities Markets, made recommendations that would later result in structural changes of market exchanges in what would serve as a precursor to the National Market System. The system enabled the setting up of a national price quotation mechanism to give all market participants both a common and an accurate view of securities prices, and led to the creation of a central clearing house that matched two sides of a trade for all trades in stocks as well as stock options. He later worked as a branch chief for OTC regulation at the SEC.

In 1967, Birnbaum joined the American Stock Exchange and, in 1977, he became president of the exchange, serving in that role for eight years until 1985. During his time at the exchange, in 1984, he helped uncover an insider trading case relating to Wall Street Journal columnist R. Foster Winans, whose column, Heard on the Street, was leaked to a stockbroker ahead of its publication. The case was one of the most high-profile cases of insider trading in the history of securities markets.

=== New York Stock Exchange ===
In April 1985, Birnbaum was named president and chief operating officer of the New York Stock Exchange, effective May 6, 1985, with a salary of $500,000 per year. Birnbaum's appointment was "the first time a senior officer of the Amex has taken a ranking post with its larger rival". In 1986, Birnbaum angered traders of the New York Futures Exchange by stating "N.Y.F.E. is not a major player".

Birnbaum served as president during the market crash of 1987, when US stock prices dropped more than 22 percent, or 508 points, in a single day on October 19, 1987. The day would later be dubbed "Black Monday". His actions during the incident included freezing of trading, but restarting as normal the very next day. The New York Times described his actions as having "helped soothe investors and prevent a frenzied sell-off from continuing".

Subsequently, Birnbaum would bring together leaders of all major exchanges to study the event and put in place a common set of rules to halt trading. In a meeting that Birnbaum convened between leaders from various exchanges, including John J. Phelan Jr. and William J. Brodsky, at the Four Seasons Hotel in Manhattan, they would agree to establish circuit breakers as trade curbing mechanisms during periods of excess volatility.

In 1988, Birnbaum was replaced as president by Richard Grasso, who had been the executive vice president for capital markets since 1986 and was a member of the Exchange's management committee. In a statement by former Exchange president and then Chairman, John J. Phelan Jr. said about Birnbaum: "His many years of experience in operations and extensive knowledge of securities industry issues contributed significantly to the NYSE’s ability to operate smoothly and efficiently during the market crisis." Others have noted that his initiatives shaped modern securities markets.

In 2000, he was a director of the Chicago Board Options Exchange. In February 2009, after financial markets had experienced a severe downturn and Wall Street's reputation was diminished, he stated: "It's taken a hit, but so what? We don't need all the bright people going to Wall Street, chasing money. There's a lot of things bright people can do. Like find a cure for cancer."

== Personal life ==
Birnbaum was married to the late Joy E. Birnbaum, with whom he was the father of Gregg Birnbaum (b. 1960), a journalist and professor, and Julie Duffy (b. 1965, married to Lawrence Duffy), an interior designer. In 1993, he married Gloria J. Birnbaum (b. 1942), and became stepfather to three children, Jeremy, Simon, and Jenny. He had seven grandchildren.

Birnbaum died in Boca Raton, Florida, on December 23, 2021, at the age of 94.
