= Rudolph Keppler =

German-American banker (1845–1923)

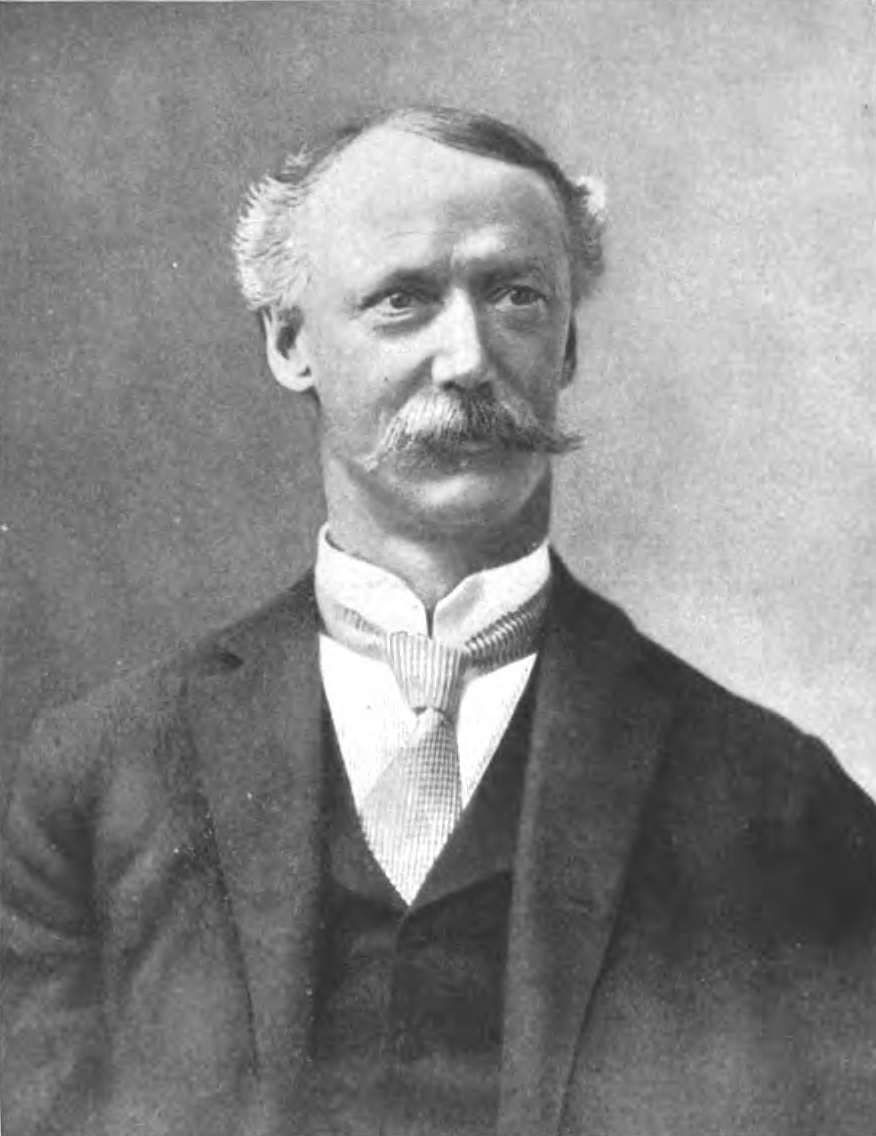

President of the New York Stock Exchange
- In office 1898–1903
- Preceded by: Francis L. Eames
- Succeeded by: Ransom H. Thomas

Personal details
- Born: February 27, 1845 Konstanz, Grand Duchy of Baden
- Died: June 4, 1923 (aged 78) New York City, U.S.
- Spouse: Elise Augusta Gramm (m. 1868; died 1917)
- Children: Emil Alexander Carl Keppler

Rudolph Keppler (February 27, 1845 – June 4, 1923) was a German-American banker who served as president of the New York Stock Exchange.

== Early life ==
Keppler was born in Konstanz, Grand Duchy of Baden on February 27, 1845. He was a son of Carl Friedrich Keppler and the former Anna Maria Zogelmann. He came to New York City in the 1850s as a boy, and was educated in New York.

== Career ==
A banker for many years, he was head of the firm of Keppler & Co. until his retirement in 1914, at which time his son took over the business. The firm was later bought and renamed Hellwig & Reutter.

In 1875, he joined the New York Stock Exchange and remained a member for forty-four years. He served as president of the Exchange for five years from 1898 through 1902. While he was president of the Exchange, much of his time was devoted to the supervising the construction of the building at 11 Wall Street. When President William McKinley was assassinated in 1901 in Buffalo during the Pan-American Exposition, "it was said that Mr. Keppler's conservative judgment and the trust in which he was held by Wall Street were important factors in preventing a panic and allaying nervous fears." In 1913, he was questioned by Samuel Untermyer during the so-called Pujo Money Trust Investigation.

Keppler was succeeded in the presidency by Ransom H. Thomas. Upon his retirement from business in 1914, Keppler resigned from the board of governors of the Exchange, on which he had served for thirty-two years, and was succeeded by Arthur Turnbull.

== Personal life ==
In 1868, Keppler was married to Elise Augusta Gramm (1847–1917), a daughter of Ferdinand Gramm and Emilie (née Lubke) Gramm. Together, they were the parents of Emil Alexander Carl Keppler (1872–1942), who succeeded his father as senior member of Keppler & Co.

Keppler died at his home, 11 West 84th Street in Manhattan, on June 4, 1923. He was buried at Kensico Cemetery in Valhalla, New York. In his will, Keppler left a total of $85,000 to seven hospitals and welfare institutions. His son Emil received $250,000 cash, his country home at Twin Lakes, Connecticut, and his personal effects which were valued at $30,000.
