= Henry George Stebbins Noble =

President of the New York Stock Exchange

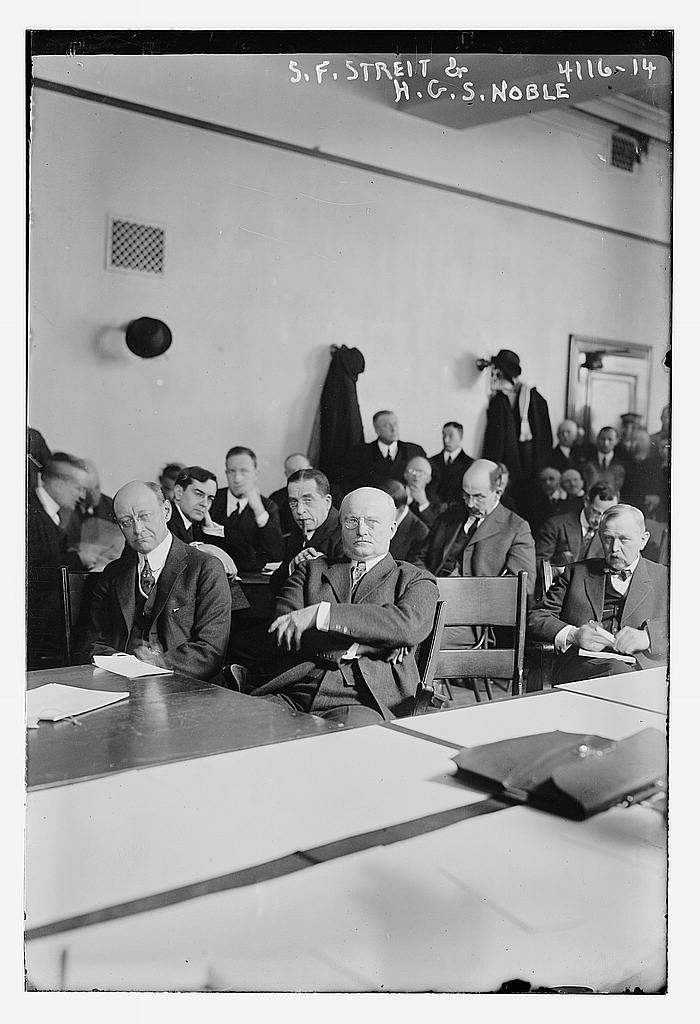

President of the New York Stock Exchange
- In office May 1914 – May 1919
- Preceded by: James B. Mabon
- Succeeded by: William H. Remick

Personal details
- Born: March 9, 1859 New York City, New York
- Died: February 6, 1946 (aged 86) Manhattan, New York City
- Spouse: Clemencia Mestre
- Parent(s): Fitzgerald Noble; Fanny Juliet Stebbins
- Relatives: Henry George Stebbins (grandfather)
- Education: City College of New York

Henry George Stebbins Noble (March 9, 1859 – February 6, 1946) was president of the New York Stock Exchange from 1914 to 1919.

== Early life ==
Henry George Stebbins Noble was born in New York City, New York on March 9, 1859, and named after his maternal grandfather. He was a son of Timothy Fitzgerald Noble (b. 1827) and Fanny Juliet Stebbins (1834–1907).

His maternal grandfather was Henry George Stebbins, a U.S. Representative from New York who also served as president of the New York Stock Exchange from 1851 to 1852, 1858–1859 and 1863–1864. His cousin, Rowland Stebbins, was a stockbroker and stage producer who won a Pulitzer Prize for The Green Pastures.

Noble graduated from City College in 1880, where he was a member of Delta Kappa Epsilon.

== Career ==
In 1880 after his graduation from college, he joined Henry G. Stebbins & Son, which was founded by his grandfather in 1847. From 1885 to 1888, he was member of Noble, Mestre & Doubleday. He later became a partner in Noble, Mestre & Doremus and Noble & Mestre. In 1902, he joined De Coppet & Doremus and remained a full partner until 1927 when he became a special partner.

Beginning in 1882 when he bought his seat from his grandfather, he was a member of the New York Stock Exchange for fifty-six years until 1938. (Note: When John D. Rockefeller died in 1937, he was the oldest member of the New York Stock Exchange, but in respect to length of membership, he was junior to Noble by one year.) He served five consecutive terms as president of the New York Stock Exchange from May 1914 to May 1919. Upon his retirement in 1938, his seat went to his grandson, Henry Stebbins Noble, a partner in De Coppet & Doremus.

== Personal life ==
On October 10, 1882, Noble was married to Clemencia Mestre (1864–1947), who was born in Havana, Cuba. Clemencia was a daughter of Jose Manuel Mestre and Paulina (née Alfonza) Mestre. Together, they were listed on the Social Register and were the parents of:

- Floyd Clark Noble (1884–1980), who married Dorothy Thayer (1889–1946), a daughter of Harry Bates Thayer, president and chairman of AT&T. After her death, he married his wife's younger sister, Ruth Thayer, a widow of Webb William Weeks.
- Gwendolyn Noble (1889–1986), who married John Burke Shethar, a son of Edwin Hall Shethar.

He died on February 6, 1946, at 521 Park Avenue, his home in Manhattan.
