= John J. Phelan Jr. =

American financier (1931–2012)

John Joseph Phelan Jr.
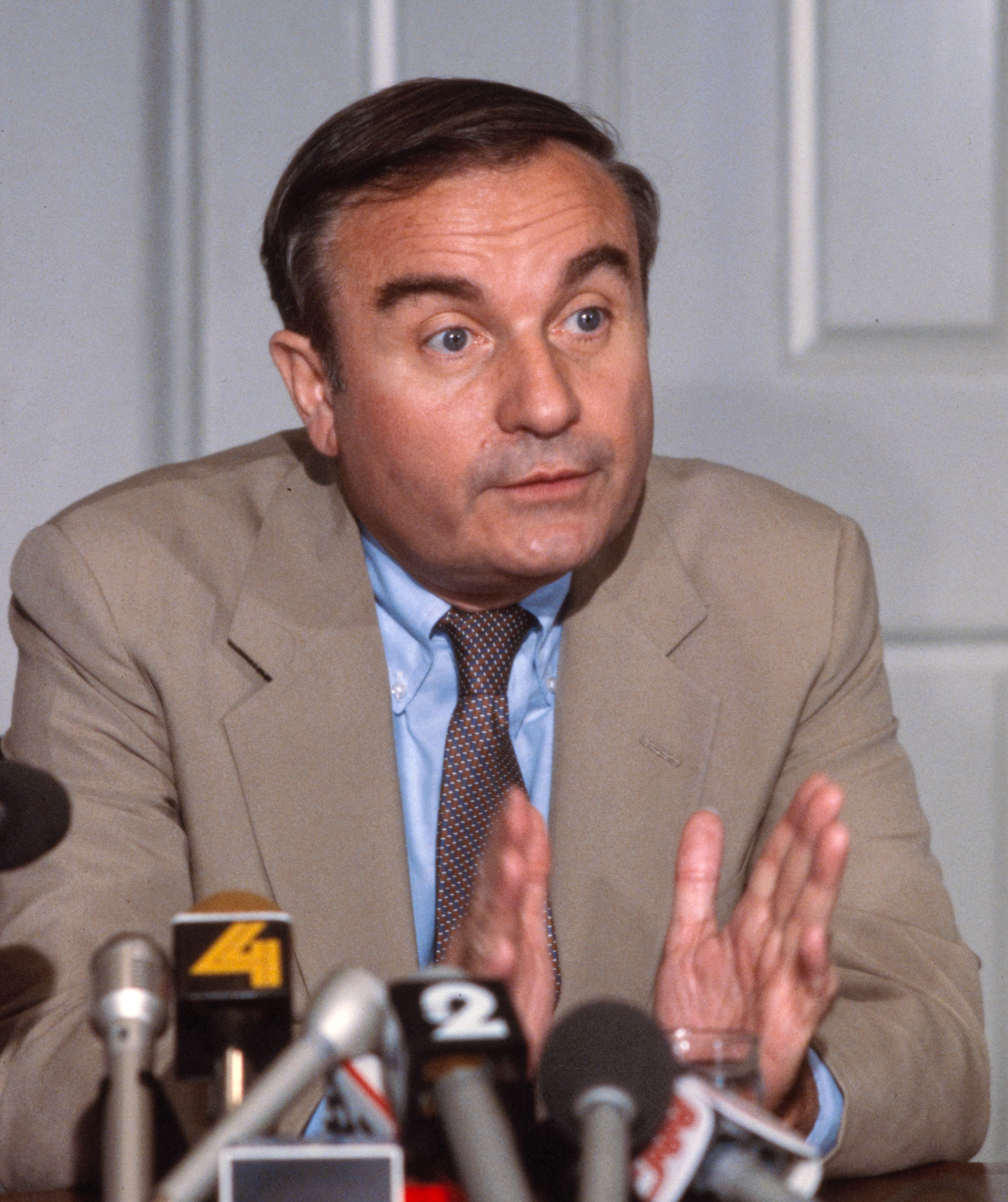
- Phelan in 1983 or 1984

President of the New York Stock Exchange
- In office 1980–1984
- Preceded by: No President between May 1972 and May 1980
- Succeeded by: Robert J. Birnbaum

Chairman of the New York Stock Exchange
- In office 1984–1990

Personal details
- Born: May 7, 1931 Manhattan, New York City
- Died: August 4, 2012 (aged 81) Manhattan, New York City
- Spouse: Joyce Phelan
- Education: Adelphi College (BA)
- Occupation: financier
- Known for: introduced computerized trading technology

John Joseph Phelan Jr. (May 7, 1931 – August 4, 2012) was an American financier who served as president and later chairman and chief executive of the New York Stock Exchange, where he introduced computerized trading technology. Phelan's leadership tenure at the NYSE included the 1987 stock market crash, during which he declined to halt trading. Phelan's calm and confident manner was widely praised. After the crash, Phelan helped to implement trading curbs also known as "circuit breakers" to help prevent rapid stock selloffs in the future.

== Biography ==
Phelan was born in Manhattan, New York City, on May 7, 1931, to John Phelan Sr., a financier and member of the NYSE, and Edna Kelly. He started college in 1949, but left after two years to serve in the US Marine Corps. After returning from the Marines, Phelan went to work as a floor trader with his father's firm, Phelan & Co. and attended Adelphi University, where he received a bachelor's degree in business administration.

John Phelan Jr. died on August 4, 2012, in Manhattan, New York City at age 81 from cancer.
