= G. Keith Funston =

American businessman

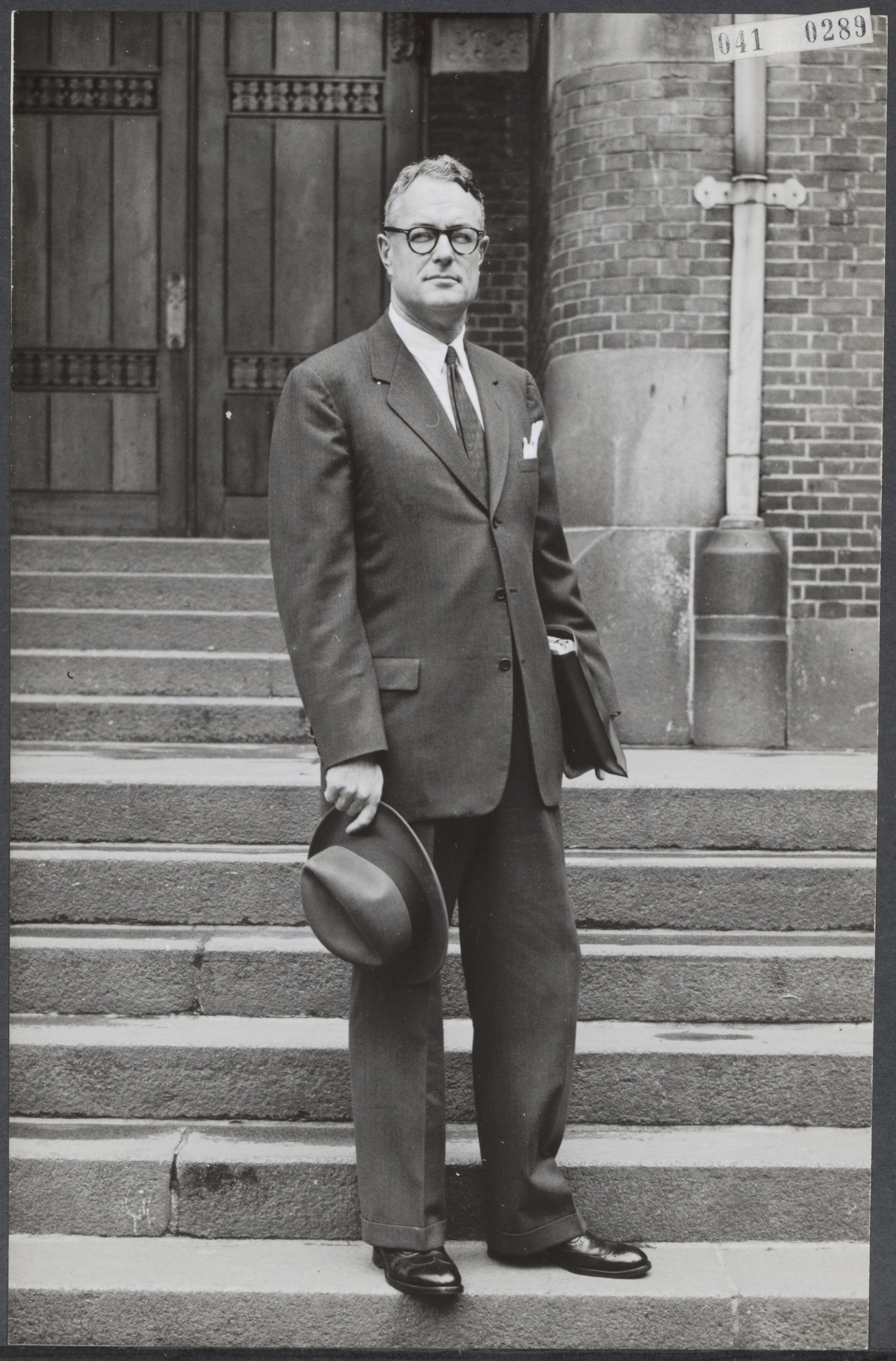
- G. Keith Funston (1956)

President of the New York Stock Exchange
- In office September 1951 – 1967
- Preceded by: Emil Schram
- Succeeded by: Robert W. Haack

President of Trinity College
- In office 1945 – September 1951
- Preceded by: Arthur Howard Hughes
- Succeeded by: Arthur Howard Hughes

Personal details
- Born: George Keith Funston; October 12, 1910 Waterloo, Iowa, U.S.
- Died: May 15, 1992 (aged 81) Greenwich, Connecticut
- Spouse: Elizabeth Kennedy
- Children: 3
- Education: Trinity College; Harvard Business School

George Keith Funston (October 12, 1910 – May 15, 1992) was an American businessman who served as president of Trinity College, Hartford, from 1945 to 1951 and president of the New York Stock Exchange from 1951 to 1967.

== Early life ==
Funston was born on October 12, 1910, in Waterloo, Iowa, and spent most of his youth in Sioux Falls, South Dakota, after moving there in 1915. He was the son of Genevieve (née Keith) Funston and Dr. George Edwin Funston, a dentist turned small-town banker.

He graduated from Trinity College in 1932, as a member of Phi Beta Kappa, president of the senior honor society and the class valedictorian. While at Trinity, he worked as a chauffeur to then president, Remsen Brinckerhoff Ogilby. He graduated from Harvard Business School in 1934.

== Career ==
After a year spent as a researcher, he worked at American Radiator and Standard Sanitary Corporation in 1935 as a sales executive, eventually working in the treasurer's office by 1938. In 1940, he joined Sylvania Electric Products as director of sales planning, before quickly becoming director of purchasing.

In 1941, he became a special assistant to Sidney J. Weinberg, and then to Donald M. Nelson, chairman of the War Production Board. In 1944, he became assistant director of the Industrial Readjustment Branch of the Navy, and held the rank of lieutenant commander.

Chosen in 1944, the then 34-year old Funston began serving as president of his undergraduate college, Trinity College in 1945. He served in that role for six years until he accepted the presidency of the exchange in September 1951.

In 1951, he succeeded Emil Schram to become the president of the New York Stock Exchange. During his time on Wall Street, the Exchange greatly expanded and trading increased dramatically. During his tenure, he was known as a "demanding boss" who had "high standards of excellence, a fantastic memory and the ability to keep many balls in the air at the same time."

== Personal life ==
In 1939, he married the former Elizabeth Kennedy (1912–2002), and they became the parents of three children, G. Keith Funston Jr., Marguerite Funston Thatcher, and Gail Funston Wasson.

Funston, who lived most of the year in Sanibel, Florida, died at his summer home in Greenwich, Connecticut, on May 15, 1992.

Business positions
Preceded by Emil Schram	President of the New York Stock Exchange; 1951 – 1967	Succeeded by Robert W. Haack
