= Catherine R. Kinney =

President of the New York Stock Exchange
- In office 2002–2008

Personal details
- Education: Iona University

Catherine R. Kinney was President of the New York Stock Exchange from 2002-08.

== Biography ==
Mrs. Kinney joined the NYSE in 1974 and rose through the ranks, holding management positions in several divisions, including Technology Planning, Sales and Marketing, and Regulation.

Mrs. Kinney graduated magna cum laude from Iona College and attended the thirteen-week Advanced Management Program, Harvard Business School. She has received honorary degrees from Georgetown University and Rosemont College.
