= Lynn Martin (banker) =

American market executive (born c.1977)

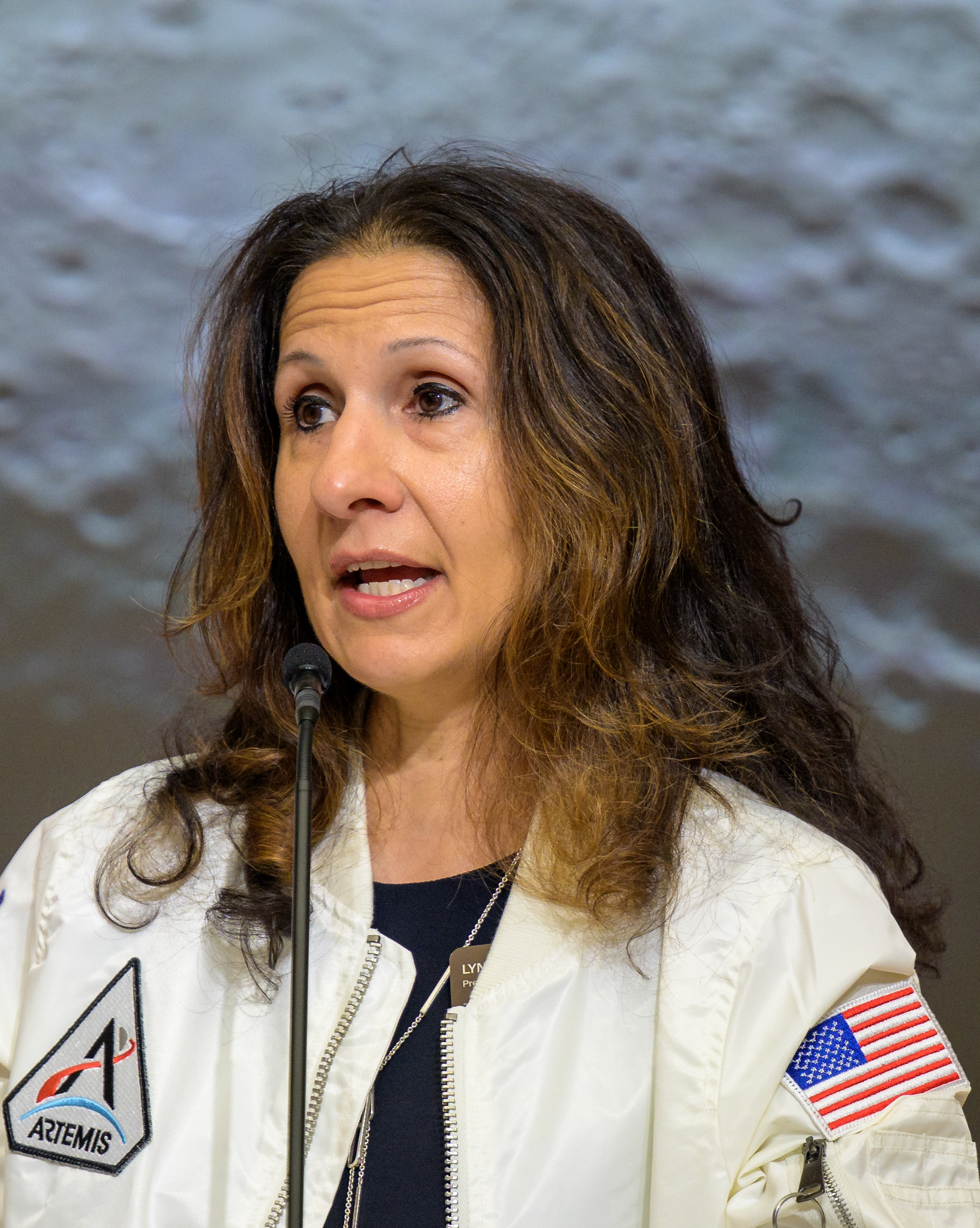
- Lynn Martin

President of the New York Stock Exchange
- Incumbent
- Assumed office January 3, 2022
- Preceded by: Stacey Cunningham

Personal details
- Born: 1976 or 1977 (age 49–50)
- Education: Manhattan College (BS); Columbia University (MA)
- Occupation: Computer programmer

Lynn Martin (born 1976 or 1977) is an American markets executive and computer programmer. On January 3, 2022, she became the 68th president of the New York Stock Exchange (NYSE).

Having completed degrees from Manhattan College (computer science) and Columbia University (statistics), Martin first joined the workforce as a computer programmer for IBM before eventually working her way up through positions with the London International Financial Futures and Options Exchange and the Intercontinental Exchange. In December 2021, her appointment as president of the NYSE was announced.

== Biography ==
Lynn Martin grew up in Smithtown, New York. Her father was an electrical engineer. Martin studied computer science and math at Manhattan College, and in 1998, she graduated with a major in computer science and a minor in finance. While working as a computer programmer at IBM for the next three years, Martin started a part-time graduate studies program and completed an MA in Statistics from Columbia University. She began working at the London International Financial Futures and Options Exchange in 2001. After the Intercontinental Exchange (ICE) purchased Interactive Data in 2015, Martin became head of ICE's fixed-income and data business unit.

In December 2021, Martin was announced as the incoming 68th president of the New York Stock Exchange (NYSE), with her predecessor Stacey Cunningham moving onto the NYSE's board of directors. On January 3, 2022, Martin officially began her tenure as president. She also became chair of the Fixed Income and Data Services at Intercontinental Exchange, which owns the NYSE.

Martin is a trustee at Manhattan College and a member of the Phi Beta Kappa society. She is on the board of directors for Partnership for New York City. and the Economic Club of New York.

In 2023, she ranked 45th in the Forbes list of "World's 100 most powerful women" and 56th on Fortune's list of Most Powerful Women. In 2024, Forbes ranked her 47th on its Power Women list.

Martin is married, has two sons, and lives on Long Island.
