= Henry G. Stebbins =

American politician (1811–1881)

Col. Henry G. Stebbins
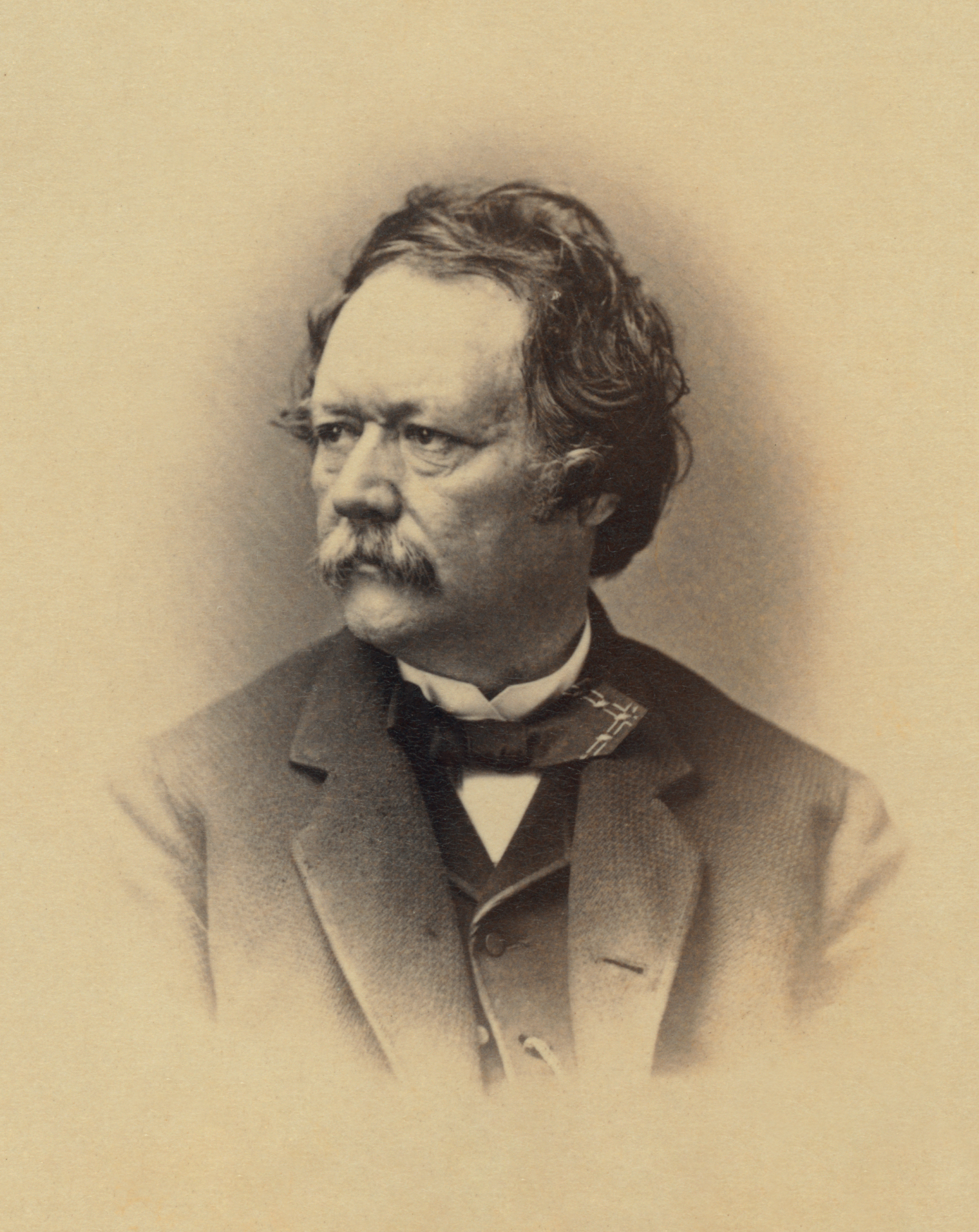
- Col. Stebbins in 1863

Member of the U.S. House of Representatives from New York's 1st district
- In office March 4, 1863 – October 24, 1864
- Preceded by: Edward H. Smith
- Succeeded by: Dwight Townsend

Personal details
- Born: September 15, 1811 Ridgefield, Connecticut
- Died: December 9, 1881 (aged 70) Manhattan, New York City, New York
- Resting place: Green-Wood Cemetery, Brooklyn, New York
- Party: Democratic
- Spouse: Sarah Augusta Weston (m. 1831)
- Children: 5
- Parent(s): John Stebbins; Mary Largin
- Relatives: Emma Stebbins (sister)

Military service
- Allegiance: United States of America
- Branch/service: (New York (state)) New York State Militia
- Rank: Colonel

Col. Henry George Stebbins (September 15, 1811 – December 9, 1881) was a U.S. Representative from New York, serving one term during the latter half of the American Civil War.

== Early life ==
Stebbins was born in Ridgefield, Connecticut, to Mary Largin (1783–1874) and John Stebbins (1783–1834), a president of the North River Bank. The sculptor Emma Stebbins was his sister. Another sister, Mary Stebbins Garland, documented her sister's life posthumously in a biography and a scrapbook, entitled Notes on the Art Life of Emma Stebbins (1888). In the scrapbook, Garland arranged images of Stebbins' works created between 1857 and 1870.

== Career ==
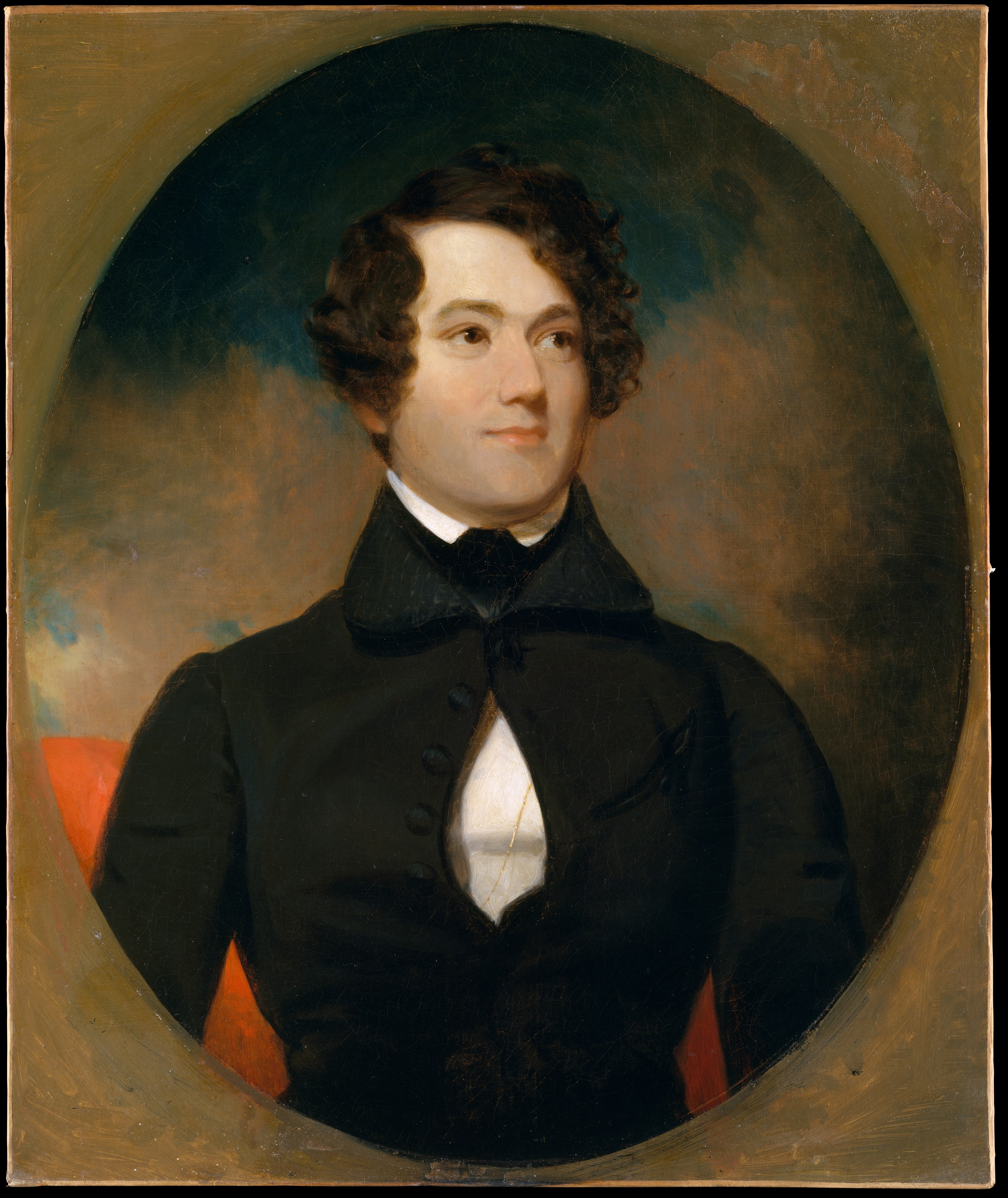
Portrait of Henry G. Stebbins by Henry Inman in the Metropolitan Museum of Art, 1838

In 1833, Stebbins became a member of the New York Stock Exchange representing the firm S. Jaudan & Co. He was the President of the Exchange for three periods: 1851–52, 1858–59 and 1863–64. In 1859, he founded the brokerage firm Henry G. Stebbins & Son. In September 1847, he was elected colonel of the Twelfth Regiment, a commission he didn't accept until May 15, 1848. He was commander of the regiment when it figured prominently in the Astor Place Riot and resigned in 1855.

=== United States Congress ===
Stebbins was elected as a Democrat to the Thirty-eighth Congress and served from March 4, 1863, until his resignation on October 24, 1864. He was a member of the Ways and Means Committee.

While in Congress, he stated that he "favored a vigorous prosecution of the war, until the authority of the Government should be reestablished over every part of the United States."

=== Later career ===
On January 7, 1868, he was elected president of the Atlantic and Great Western Railway. He was at one time vice president of the Texas Pacific Railroad. At the time of his death, he was a Director, and the real estate agent, of the New York, Lake Erie and Western Railroads.

In 1871, he took an active part in the movement to oust Boss Tweed from power and was made Chairman of the Committee of Seventy. He held this position for a few months until he resigned to accept an appointment as Commissioner of Department of Public Parks.

In 1872, he temporarily resigned as Commissioner of the Department of Public Parks so he could travel to England on urgent private business. He was temporarily succeeded by Frederick Law Olmsted. He fully resigned from the presidency again in 1873. In 1877, again put up for Park Commissioner, he was rejected by Tammany in favor of Henry D. Purroy.

He was involved in the proposed World's Fair of 1883 and served as Vice-president of the United States International Commission until March 1881 when Gen. Ulysses S. Grant resigned, then Stebbin became the president.

== Personal life ==
After moving to New York he married Sarah Augusta Weston (1808–1893) on October 8, 1831. They had five children:

- Henry Gerald Stebbins (1832–1832), who died as an infant
- Fanny Juliet Stebbins (1834–1907), who married Timothy Fitzgerald Noble (b. 1827)
- Mary Emma Stebbins (1837–1865), who married Charles Alfred Grymes (1829–1905), son of John Randolph Grymes (1786–1854)
- Cora Stebbins (b. 1839), who married William Pickering Talboys (b. 1829), son of David Alphonso Talboys (c. 1790–1840)
- Charles Henry Stebbins (b. 1841), who married Minerva Cook Vail (b. 1846), the daughter of Henry F. Vail (1812–1881), president of the National Bank of Commerce.

=== Death and burial ===
On December 9, 1881, Stebbins died at his residence, No. 2 West 16th Street in New York City, and was later interred in Green-Wood Cemetery, Brooklyn, New York. At the time of his death, he was the oldest member on the roll of the Stock Exchange.

=== Descendants ===
His grandson, Henry George Stebbins Noble (1859–1946), was also president of the New York Stock Exchange from 1914 to 1919.

His grandson, Rowland Stebbins (1882–1948), was a stockbroker and stage producer who won a Pulitzer Prize for The Green Pastures, which he reportedly made $500,000 off of. He married Marion Lyman in 1907 and had three children, Rowland Stebbins, Jr., H. Lyman Stebbins, and Marion Stebbins (Heidt).

=== Interests ===
Stebbins was appointed president of the Central Park Commission and served as Commodore of the New York Yacht Club from 1863 to 1870. He owned the schooner-yacht Phantom when he was Commodore of the New York Yacht Club. Since 1870, Stebbins was succeeded by James Gordon Bennett Jr. Stebbins was also a trustee of the American Museum of Natural History and president of the Arcadian Club, the Dramatic Fund Association and the Academy of Music. He was a member of the Union Club, Union League, and Manhattan Club.

U.S. House of Representatives
Preceded by Edward H. Smith	Member of the U.S. House of Representatives from New York's 1st congressional district March 4, 1863 - October 24, 1864	Succeeded by Dwight Townsend
