= Mildred Seydell =

American journalist (1889–1988)

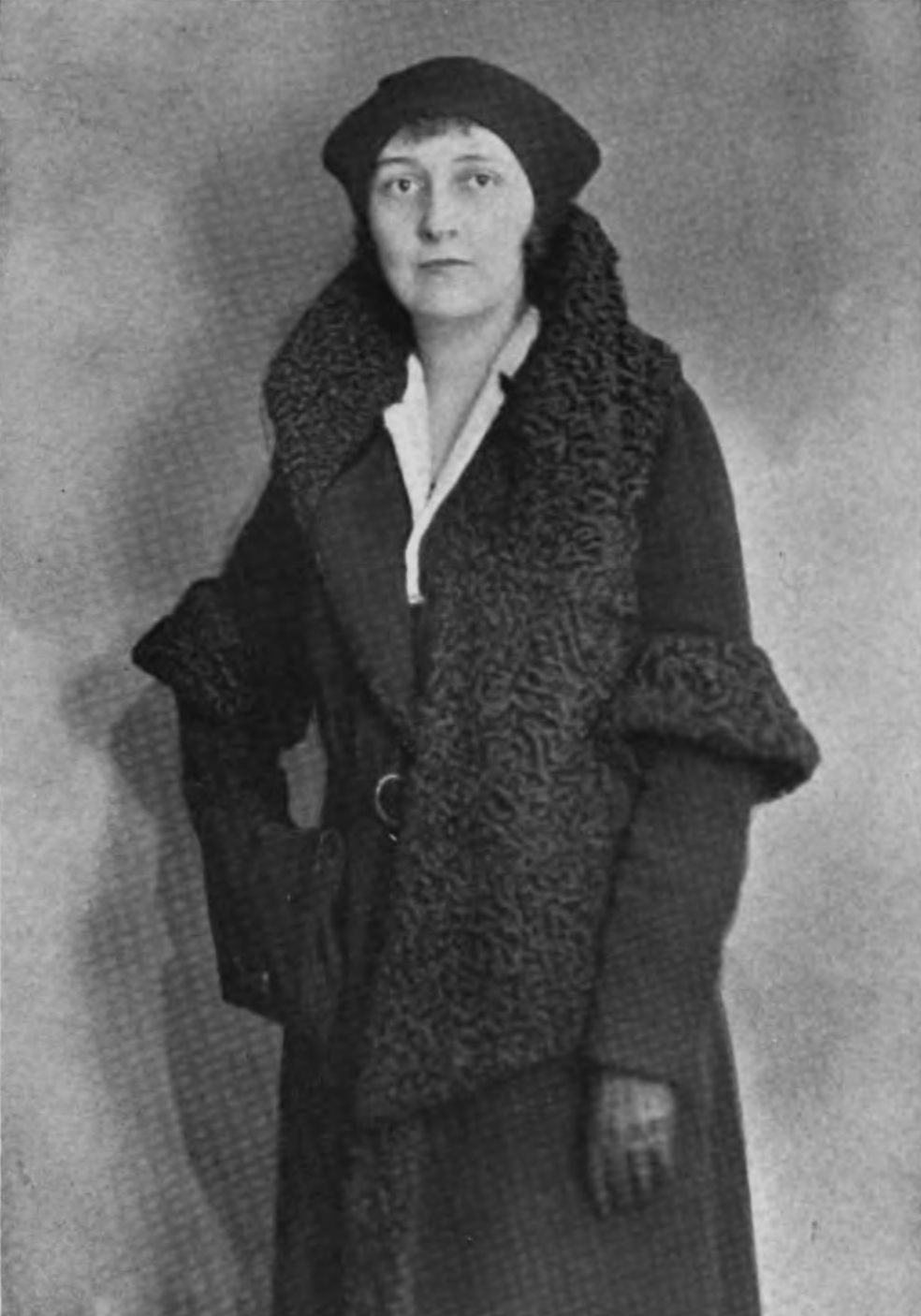
- Seydell c. 1931
- Born: Mildred Rutherford Wooley; March 21, 1889; Atlanta, Georgia, U.S.
- Died: February 20, 1988 (aged 98); Roswell, Georgia, U.S.
- Occupation: Writer
- Spouse(s): First husband Paul Bernard Seydel, married February 5, 1910
- Children: 2

Mildred Seydell (born Mildred Rutherford Woolley; March 21, 1889 – February 20, 1988) was an American pioneering journalist in Georgia. Seydel wrote as a syndicated columnist and founded the Seydell Journal, a quarterly journal that was the successor to The Think Tank. The Think Tank was a short-lived biweekly journal of poetry, articles and reviews (1940–1947). She founded the Mildred Seydell Publishing Company, and regularly gave speeches.

== Early life ==
Seydell's parents were Vasser Woolley, an attorney and businessman from Atlanta, and Bessie Cobb Rutherford, the daughter of Colonel John Cobb Rutherford, who was also an attorney. Named after her grandfather's sister Mildred Lewis Rutherford, Seydell was the elder of two children. Her brother Vasser Woolley, Jr., six or seven years younger than her, would follow their father in business. Seydell attended the Lucy Cobb Institute in Athens, Georgia, an institute that her great-aunt and namesake was involved in before her death, but Seydell soon left in order to attend the Sorbonne.

== Career ==
In 1922, she began her career as a journalist with the Charleston Gazette, a West Virginia newspaper. In 1924 she moved to Atlanta as a correspondent for that paper. She was affiliated with the Atlanta Georgian, one of William Randolph Hearst's string of newspapers, working there from 1926 until its closing in 1938.

Seydell was twice married. Her first marriage which lasted from 1910 to 1944 was to Paul Bernard Seydel, a Belgian chemist/scientist whom she met while studying at the Sorbonne. Their children were Paul and John. After her husband died from complications of a colectomy, she married Max Seydel, her first husband's brother, in 1947. For two decades, Belgium was their home, until their return in 1967 to Atlanta. She adopted his last name with two "L"s as her pen name at the beginning of her journalistic career.

She reported on the Scopes Monkey Trial in 1925. It was her first major story. She interviewed Harold E. "Red" Grange, and was pictured doing his hand reading, a technique she used to "break the ice" with an interview subject. During the Scopes trial, Seydell was sent a picture of a monkey's hand, and she was photographed comparing the hands of the Bible toting judge John T. Raulston, Clarence Darrow and William Jennings Bryan to it.

During her career, she interviewed Italian Prime Minister Benito Mussolini in 1926, Risto Ryti, the Finnish President and Jean Sibelius were interviewed by her while she was on tour in Finland and Lapland. Other notable personages interviewed by her included (in alphabetical order): the wife of Edvard Beneš, George Cukor, Ève Curie, Marion Davies, and Bette Davis. She was quoted as having once opined that she "much preferred to set the stage for adventure rather than the table for dinner". Her interviews appeared in her column, Talks with Celebrities, (Hollywood celebrities mostly) which was carried in 27 Hearst papers and the Universal News Service. Other columns included What Would You Do? (advice column from 1926 to 1931) renamed as Mildred Seydell Says... in 1933, and All in a Day.

In her columns, she detailed the suffering of the unemployed in the 1930s, and offered advice.

Seydell became intertwined with the National Woman's Party and the struggle for equal rights following the passage of the 19th Amendment. In 1931 and 1932, she was Chairperson of Atlanta and Georgia, respectively. In 1935 she became associate editor of Equal Rights, its national publication.

Other women's organizations in which she was active included: the League of Women Voters, the League of American Pen Women (on March 13, 1931, after meeting with its national president, she was one of 15 Charter members of the Atlanta Branch), the National Federation of Press Women, the Pan American League, the Atlanta Women's Chamber of Commerce; and the Atlanta Woman's Club. From 1941-43, Seydell served as President of the Atlanta Federation of Women's Clubs. Seydell was active in the Federation of American Women's Club Overseas (in Belgium) and the American Woman's Club of Brussels.

Seydell was an enthusiastic supporter of the Tallulah Falls School, "the only school in the United States which is owned and operated by a state federation of women's clubs." It was founded in 1909 by the Georgia Federation of Women's Clubs. As Seydell wrote in the Atlanta Georgian, "The school is called the 'Light in the Mountains' because ignorance is darkness and knowledge is light."

She was an accomplished traveler, having gone to at least 52 "far lands during her career."

In 1973, she was honored with the Order of Leopold by the Belgian government for her cultural exchange contributions between Belgium and the United States.

She wrote and planned to publish her autobiography The Record on the Wall. It was not published. The manuscript is at the Emory Library.

== Legacy ==
Her papers and memorabilia (67.5 feet (20.6 m) linear) at Emory University are collected.

A collection of early and rare Belgian poetry and masterpiece books was created by her at the Emory University Library in 1971 in honor of her late husband Paul. It was a gift of the charitable foundation, organized in 1982, which bears their names.

In a Georgia State Capitol ceremony on Martin Luther King Day in 2012, Georgia Governor Nathan Deal quoted Chins Up! by Mildred Seydell: "Great men don't hate. They are too busy with their accomplishments. Hate flourishes in the breasts of those who have time to feel their wrongs. Hate is the weapon of the defeated, love that of the victor. No man ever won by hating, but many have conquered by loving."

== Published works ==
- Secret Fathers. New York: Grosset & Dunlap. 1930.
- Chins Up!. New York: Grosset & Dunlap. 1939.
- Seydell, Mildred (January 1969). Come Along to Belgium. T S Denison & Co. ISBN 978-0-513-00521-1.
- Poetry profile of Belgium. Wauthier-Braine, Belgium: Mildred Seydell Pub. Co. c. 1967.
