= Seney–Stovall Chapel =

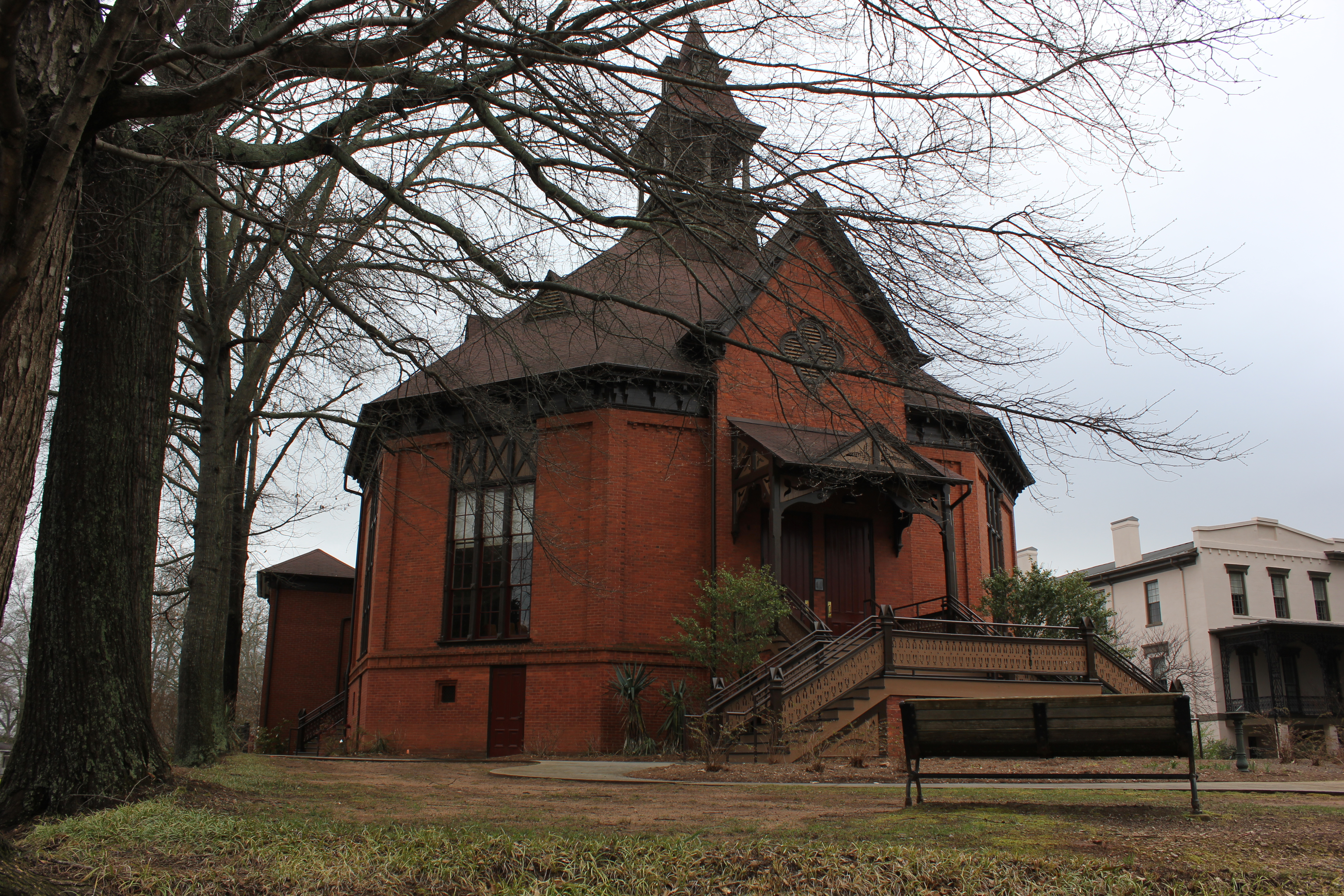
- The building in 2015
- Seney–Stovall Chapel
- 33°57′22″N 83°23′21″W
- Location: Athens, Georgia
- Country: U.S.

Architecture
- Architect: William Winstead Thomas
- Completed: 1881 (145 years ago)

Seney–Stovall Chapel is a church building in Athens, Georgia, United States. Part of Cobbham Historic District, it is located in the grounds of the former Lucy Cobb Institute, itself now part of the University of Georgia. It is named for George I. Seney and Nellie Stovall.

Mildred Lewis Rutherford (or "Miss Millie"), then head of the Lucy Cobb Institute, decided the girls needed a chapel and had them write seeking funding for one. In 1881, Nellie Stovall wrote "a beautiful and girlish letter" to George I. Seney, who responded with the funding for the $10,000 structure, an octagonal red brick building called the Seney-Stovall Chapel. It was designed by a local architect William Winstead Thomas.

When Rutherford stepped down from the role of principal in 1895, she was replaced at the school's helm by her sister, Mary Ann Lipscomb. Rutherford and Lipscomb were nieces of Thomas Reade Rootes Cobb.

In 1986, R.E.M. recorded two songs—their own song, "Swan Swan H", and a cover of Boudleaux Bryant's "Dream (All I Have to Do)"—in the chapel for the documentary Athens, GA: Inside/Out.
