= William Winstead Thomas =

American architect

William Winstead Thomas (1848–1904) was an American insurance company president and an architect.

He was president of the Southern Mutual Insurance Company.

Several of his works are listed on the U.S. National Register of Historic Places for their architecture.

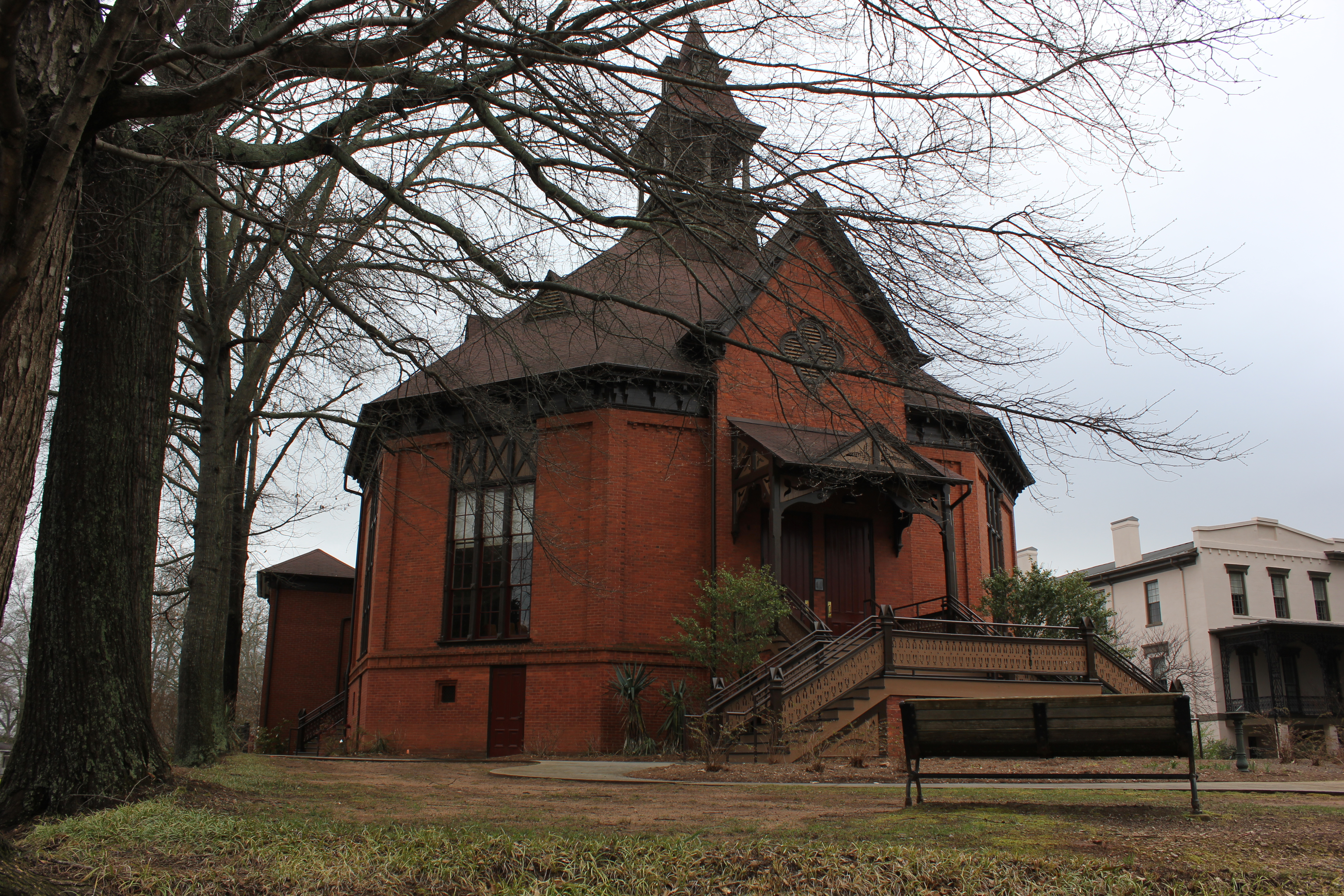
Seney–Stovall Chapel in 2015

He designed the Octagon Mode Seney–Stovall Chapel, a $10,000 structure octagonal red brick building funded by George I. Seney.

His architectural works include:

- Jackson County Courthouse (1879), Jefferson, Georgia, one of his earlier works, NRHP-listed
- Seney-Stovall Chapel (1882–85), Lucy Cobb Institute Campus, 200 N. Milledge Ave., University of Georgia campus Athens, Georgia (Thomas, W.W.), NRHP-listed
- Oconee County Courthouse (no longer extant)
- Thomas-Carithers House, 530 S. Milledge Ave. Athens, Georgia, NRHP-listed
- White Hall, Whitehall and Simonton Bridge Rds., outside Atlanta in Whitehall, Georgia, NRHP-listed. One of his most notable residential works.
- McDaniel-Tichenor House, 319 McDaniel St. Monroe, Georgia, NRHP-listed
- One or more works in NRHP-listed McDaniel Street Historic District, S. Broad and McDaniel Streets, Monroe, Georgia
