= George Seney =

George Seney may refer to:

- George E. Seney (1832–1905), American politician, lawyer and judge from Ohio
- George I. Seney (1826–1893), American banker, art collector, and benefactor from New York City
