= Mildred Lewis Rutherford =

White supremacist and historian general of the United Daughters of the Confederacy

- "Miss Millie" Rutherford
- Born: July 16, 1851; Athens, Georgia, United States
- Died: August 15, 1928 (aged 77); Georgia, United States
- Resting place: Oconee Hill Cemetery
- Occupation: Writer Propagandist Educator
- Writing career
- Literary movement: White supremacy

Mildred Lewis Rutherford (July 16, 1851 – August 15, 1928) was a prominent white supremacist speaker, educator, and author from Athens, Georgia. She served in the Lucy Cobb Institute, as its head and in other capacities, for over forty years, and oversaw the addition of the Seney-Stovall Chapel to the school. Heavily involved in many organizations, she became the historian general of the United Daughters of the Confederacy (UDC), and a speech given by her for the UDC was the first by a woman to be recorded in the Congressional Record. She was a prolific writer in historical subjects and an advocate of the Lost Cause narrative. Rutherford was distinctive in dressing as a southern belle for her speeches. She held strong pro-Confederacy, proslavery views and opposed women's suffrage.

== Biography ==
=== Family background ===
Mildred Rutherford was born July 16, 1851, in Athens, Georgia; she was the daughter of Laura Cobb Rutherford (Howell and Thomas's sister) and Williams Rutherford, a professor of mathematics at the University of Georgia. Mildred Rutherford was the granddaughter of John Addison Cobb, whose involvement in agriculture (he owned a plantation with 209 slaves by 1840), the Georgia Railroad, and real estate made him "one of the area's wealthiest men". She was the niece of John's sons Howell Cobb, who served six terms as a Democratic Congressman and Speaker of the House for two years, and the lawyer Thomas R. R. Cobb, one of the founders of the University of Georgia School of Law – he "codified Georgia's state laws", "wrote the wartime state constitution of 1861", and was a prominent proslavery propagandist; T.R.R. Cobb founded the Lucy Cobb Institute in response to a letter that Laura Rutherford had sent anonymously to the local paper.

=== Education and career ===
Rutherford entered the Lucy Cobb Institute at the age of eight "in the school's first session". She was graduated from there at the age of sixteen in 1868.

==== Educator ====
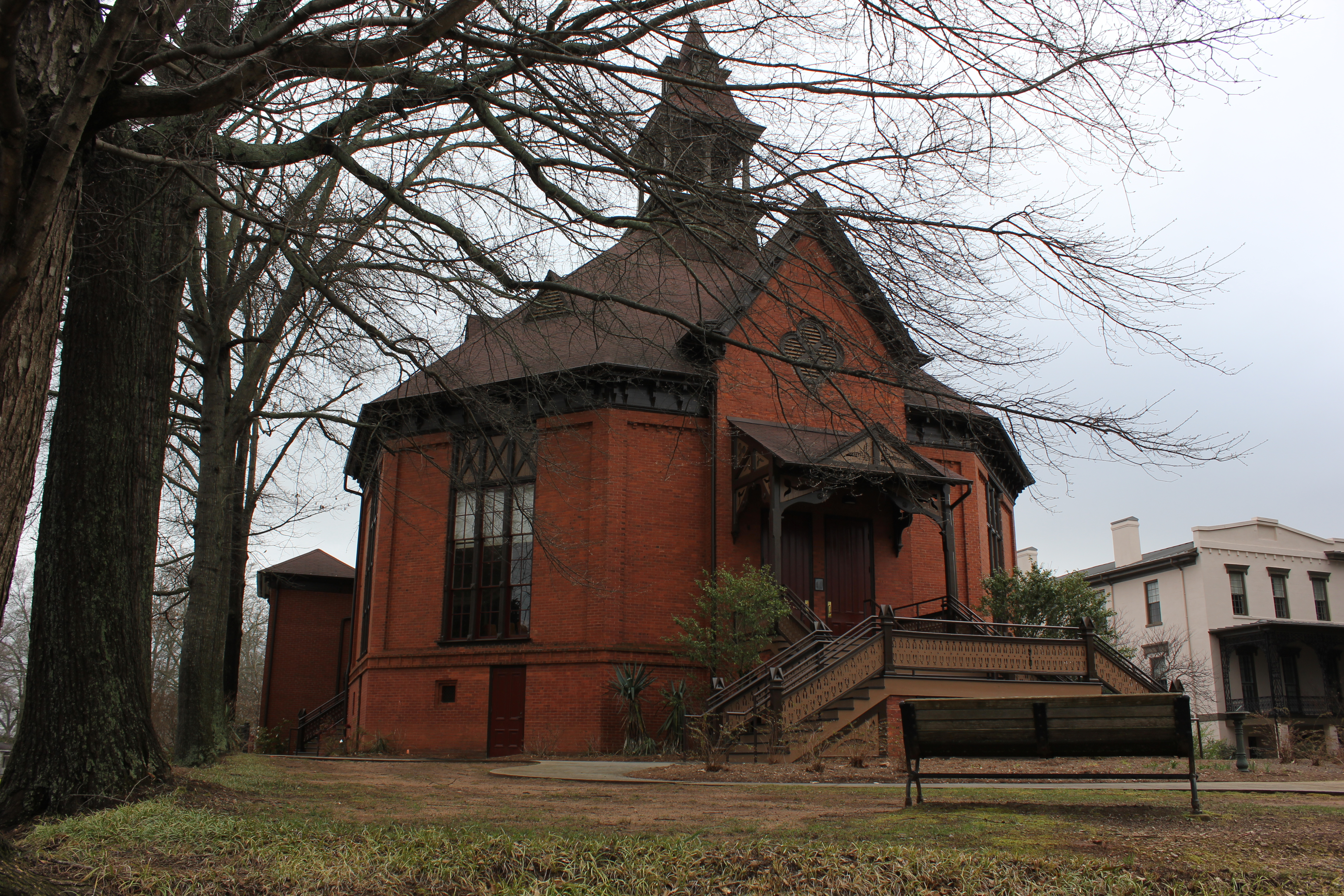
Seney–Stovall Chapel in 2015

After teaching in Atlanta for eight years, Rutherford served as the principal of the Lucy Cobb Institute in Athens from 1880 to 1895 and lived in a house directly across the street until it burned c. 1926, continuing to serve the school in various capacities for over forty years (including several years again at its head "with the title of 'president' signaling the school's college-level ambitions"). According to Sarah Case,

Rutherford took over a struggling institution and rebuilt it into one of the most prestigious schools for young women in Georgia. She immediately went to work improving its academic standards, beautifying the physical plant, and increasing enrollment. In agreeing to head the school, Rutherford had insisted that the all-male board of directors cede to her its control of the budget and power to hire and fire staff.

She decided the students needed a chapel and had them write seeking funding for one. In 1881, Nellie Stovall wrote "a beautiful and girlish letter" to George I. Seney, who responded with $10,000 in funding (and a challenge to the town for an additional $4,000) for the structure, an octagonal red brick building called the Seney–Stovall Chapel.

Case further describes Lucy Cobb under Rutherford's direction:

Rutherford's deep concern with propriety and feminine modesty should not obscure the fact that the school prepared women for more than traditional domestic roles. Lucy Cobb recognized that many of its alumnae would seek employment, and by teaching students marketable, and at the same time, respectable, skills, as well as genteel decorum and dress, Lucy Cobb created a new image of elite white single womanhood that combined aspects of the new woman and the southern belle, what I call the "new belle." As early as 1885, a Lucy Cobb commencement speaker argued that women ought to be allowed into more professions.

==== Orator and historian ====
Rutherford was an accomplished public speaker – she ofttimes dressed as a southern belle when orating – who addressed a great number of local organizations, including the YMCA, the Ladies Memorial Association (for which she served as president), and the Athens chapter of the United Daughters of the Confederacy (UDC), and in November 1912 addressed the national assembly of the UDC as their historian general.

She "became perhaps the best-known amateur historian in the early twentieth century for her extensive writings and speeches, her historical journal, published from 1923 to 1927, and her promotion of historical work among the UDC as that organization's Historian General from 1911 to 1916". She gave "the first speech by a woman to be printed in the Congressional Record" in 1916 at a UDC convention.

== Death and legacy ==
In 1927 Rutherford became seriously ill. Late on Christmas night, as she convalesced, her house suffered a devastating fire, consuming many of her personal papers and belongings, including "most of her private collection of Confederate artifacts". She died on August 15, 1928, and was interred in Oconee Hill Cemetery, in East Hill, one of the two original sections of the cemetery. Her great niece Mildred Seydell was named in her honor and became a well-known journalist, one of the first in Georgia, and a nationally syndicated columnist.

Rutherford has a student dormitory named after her at the University of Georgia.

== Views ==
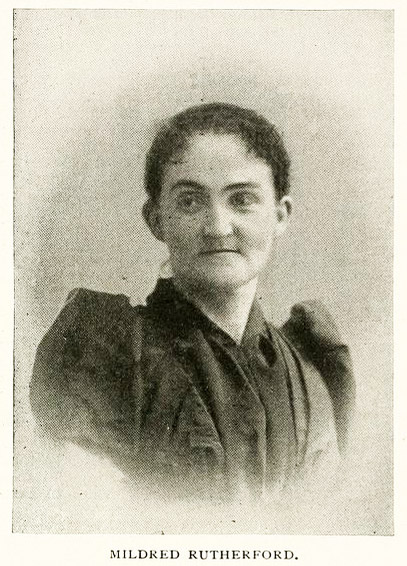
Mildred Rutherford, circa, 1897

Rutherford was Baptist with a strong faith and expressed a "deep preoccupation with propriety and morality" in her textbooks, criticizing "authors who openly portrayed sexuality or themselves lived in ways Rutherford found immoral". She lauded the works of Southern writers and female writers.

According to University of Georgia historian Ann E. Marshall, she was a "tireless advocate of the 'Lost Cause' version of southern history" (referring to the Lost Cause of the Confederacy). Goals of her writing included "establishing the South's contribution to United States history, legitimizing secession, and idealizing the antebellum plantation", and she defended American slavery, thinking its only problem was the burden it put upon the white slaveholders. She viewed "true history" – the way she saw, defined, and proselytized it – as a potential common ground between North and South, and also believed it to be a potent political weapon in support of the causes she espoused. Specifically she fought to indoctrinate future generations by eliminating any books which did not support her views, writing to all schools and librarians, "Reject any book that says the South fought to hold her slaves". She was willing to alter the historical record to make her point—in a speech in Dallas in 1916 she claimed that "the negroes in the South were never called slaves. That term came in with the abolition crusade." Historian David W. Blight stated that she sought the vindication of the Confederacy "with a political fervor that would rival the ministry of propaganda in any twentieth-century dictatorship".

In 1914, she joined the Georgia Association Opposed to Woman Suffrage and became a "vocal opponent" of women's suffrage and the Nineteenth Amendment to the United States Constitution, which was ratified on August 18, 1920. She viewed suffrage as "not a step toward equality, but rather a way of robbing women of the only power they truly held – that of feminine influence and persuasion within their families. Rutherford never reconciled this view with the fact that she herself was one of Georgia's most publicly active and well-known women of her time". Her opposition was "formidable": Dolly Blount Lamar and Rutherford headed the organization, and in 1919 this "conservative state" became the nation's first to reject the amendment. Case asserts that while "Rutherford reserved her strongest resistance for the suffrage amendment," she "opposed all constitutional amendments, including prohibition, despite her anti-alcohol sentiments, on the basis of limiting federal power".

== Selected writings ==
Mildred Lewis Rutherford wrote 29 historically significant books and pamphlets, many printed at her own expense. They were widely read. Among them are:

- Rutherford, Mildred Lewis (1890). English Authors: A Hand-Book of English Literature from Chaucer to Living Writers. Atlanta.
- Rutherford, Mildred Lewis (1894). American authors: a hand-book of American literature from early colonial to living writers. Atlanta: The Franklin Printing and Publishing Company.
- Rutherford, Mildred Lewis (1906). The South in History and Literature: a handbook of Southern authors from the Settlement of Jamestown, 1607, to living writers. Atlanta.
- Rutherford, Mildred Lewis (1916). Address delivered by Miss Mildred Lewis Rutherford, historian general, United Daughters of the Confederacy. Thirteen periods of United States history. New Orleans, La. Thursday, November 21st, 1912. at Internet Archive.
- Rutherford, Mildred Lewis (1906). French Authors: A Hand-Book of French Literature. Froissart --Living writers. Atlanta: The Franklin Printing and Publishing Company.
- Rutherford, Mildred Lewis (1916). Four Addresses. Paul Hunter Books, Arranged and printed by The Mildred Rutherford Historical Circle. "Mildred Lewis Rutherford."
- Rutherford, Mildred Lewis (1998) [1920]. Truths of History: A Historical Perspective of the Civil War From the Southern Viewpoint. Athens, Georgia (original); Atlanta, Georgia (reprint): Southern Lion Books, Inc. ISBN 0-9662454-0-7.
- Rutherford, Mildred Lewis (1920). A measuring rod to test text books, and reference books in schools, colleges and libraries. Athens, Georgia: United Confederate Veterans.
- Rutherford, Mildred Lewis (1923). The South Must Have her Rightful Place in History. Athens, Georgia: The author?.
- Rutherford, Mildred Lewis (1926). Georgia: The Thirteenth Colony. Athens, Georgia. OCLC 1390253.
