= Carl Vinson Institute of Government =

American organisation

The Carl Vinson Institute of Government (CVIOG) is an organization that works closely with officials and employees from state and local governments in the U.S. state of Georgia and internationally to help them achieve their missions and improve public service. CVIOG is a unit of the Office of Public Service and Outreach at the University of Georgia (UGA) in Athens, Georgia.

The Institute of Government offers training programs for public officials and staff, conducts research on a broad range of questions relevant to state and local governments, and provides assistance to help those governments and agencies run more efficiently and effectively.

== History ==
Originally established at the University of Georgia as the Institute of Public Affairs in 1927, the organization was charged with providing “a forum to study international, national, state, and local affairs and to make recommendations for improved governance.” It combined research, technical assistance, training, and publications.

Over the course of the following decades, the Institute of Public Affairs expanded to address the needs of the state’s rising population, and it underwent several name changes—Institute for the Study of Georgia Problems (1938), Institute of Law and Government (1953), and Institute of Government (1965).

The organization became the Carl Vinson Institute of Government, when authorized by Federal Law in 1984, when it was renamed in honor of Georgia representative Carl Vinson, who served in the U.S. House of Representatives for more than 50 years.

The Vinson Institute moved its headquarters to its current location at the historic Lucy Cobb Complex in 1991. It also maintains offices on other parts of the UGA campus and in Atlanta, Georgia, near the Georgia State Capitol.

== Divisions ==
- Director's Office
- Governmental Training, Education, and Development
- Information Technology Outreach Services
- Office of Communications
- Office of Finance & Administration
- State Services and Decision Support
- Strategic Operations and Planning Assistance
- Workforce and Economic Development

== Areas of service ==
The Institute of Government provides:

=== Assistance ===
The Institute of Government conducts a variety of assistance programs to help governments and agencies improve their operations and plan for the future. Many of these programs are geared toward promoting efficient and effective service delivery. Faculty at the institute also perform program evaluation for departments and agencies within Georgia’s state and local governments.

There is a human resource management group that conducts classification and compensation studies, executive searches, promotional testing for public safety organizations, and other HR-related functions. The local government studies group performs annexation and consolidation studies, service delivery studies, departmental reviews, tax equity studies, and other projects about the issues facing cities and counties.

The Office of Information Technology Outreach Services (ITOS) assists government entities with the use of geographic information system (GIS) technology through application development, digital mapping, database creation, and more.

=== Training and development ===
The Institute of Government provides training and professional development to thousands of public officials and employees in Georgia annually. The training takes a variety of forms in order to develop participants’ leadership, talents, knowledge, and skills.

Local government training programs are designed for county commissioners, city council members, mayors, city and county managers and planners, municipal and county clerks, financial managers, and others involved in local government. The institute also conducts specific training for newly elected officials in city and county governments.

At the Georgia state level, the Institute of Government has coordinated the Biennial Institute for Georgia Legislators since 1958. Every two years following General Assembly elections, the members of the Georgia House of Representatives and Senate meet and attend information sessions pertaining to significant, timely issues. These sessions are conducted by Institute of Government faculty, veteran lawmakers and staff, agency administrators, and subject experts.

The Institute of Government also coordinates the Georgia Legislative Leadership Institute (GLLI), an extension of the Biennial Institute. Developed and authorized by the Georgia General Assembly Training Institute, GLLI forms the core of a leadership development program for newer members of the state legislature. The institute also operates the Georgia Leadership Institute (GLI), which provides leadership development for managers and executives in Georgia’s state agencies.

=== Applied research ===
Research faculty at the Institute of Government provide objective, timely information to policymakers and decision makers to aid them in their work. They design and conduct customized studies to collect data, gauge opinion through surveys, evaluate programs, and more. Areas of study include, but are not limited to, demography, the environment, public opinion, economic impact, and legislative policy.

=== International services ===
The Institute offers international services to work to help nations in transition strengthen governance and administrative capability. Through instructional programs, technical assistance, and research, faculty and staff work to develop more efficient, transparent, and responsive governments.

=== Student involvement ===
The Institute of Government engages undergraduate and graduate students from the University of Georgia in its work through a variety of programs. The Vinson Fellows Program is an undergraduate internship through which students are paired with faculty-mentors and gain real world experience in state and local government. The Institute of Government also coordinates the Georgia Legislative Intern Program (GLIP), a statewide program that involves undergraduates in the work of the Georgia General Assembly. The institute cosponsors UGA’s Master of Public Administration (MPA) program with the University of Georgia School of Public and International Affairs.
