= Mary Seney Sheldon =

President of the New York Philharmonic Orchestra

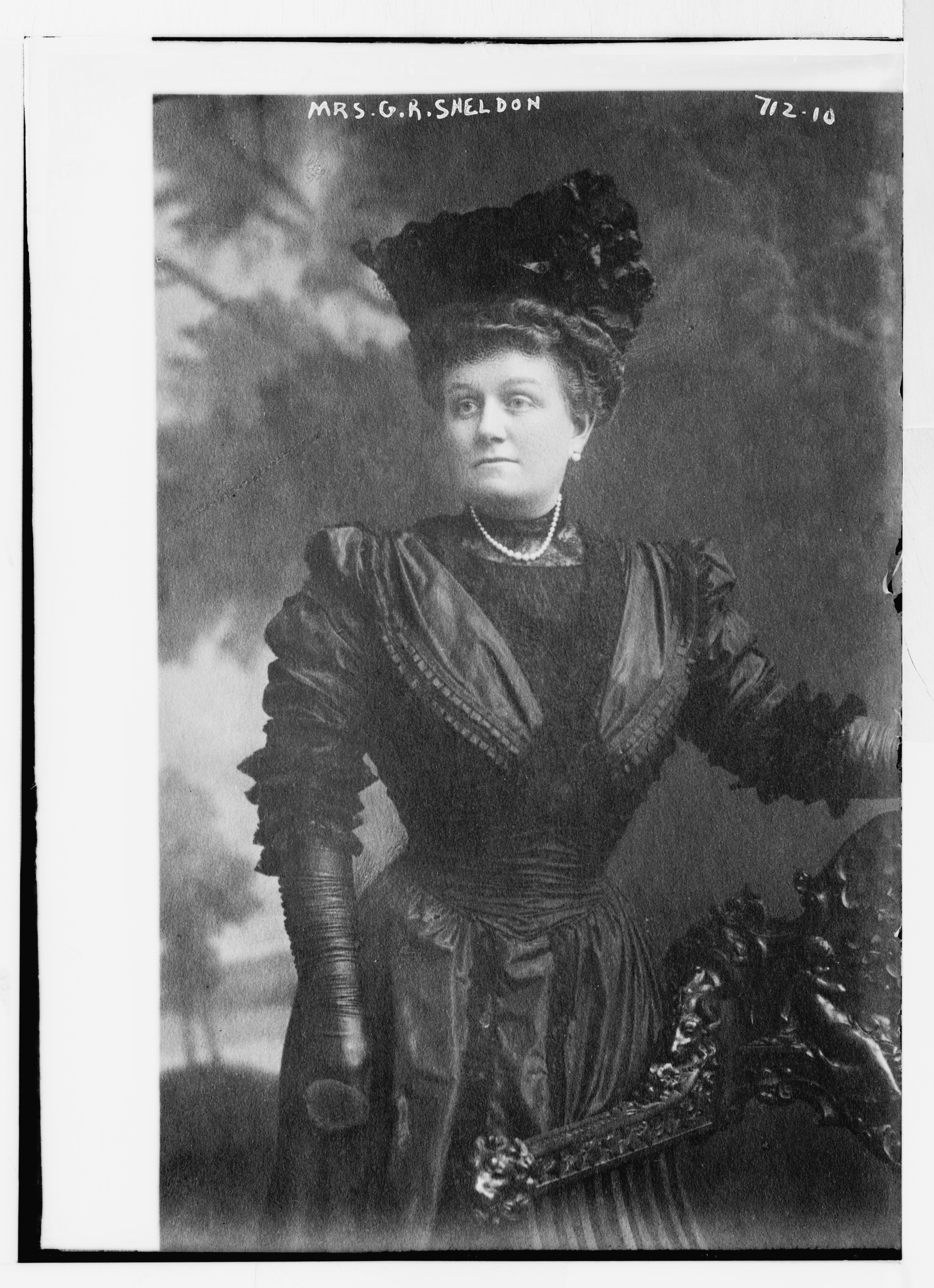
- Photograph of Mrs. Sheldon

President of the New York Philharmonic
- In office 1912–1913

Personal details
- Born: Mary Robinson Seney; July 3, 1863 Brooklyn, New York
- Died: June 16, 1913 (aged 49) Manhattan, New York
- Spouse: George R. Sheldon (after 1881)
- Parent(s): George I. Seney; Phoebe Augusta Moser

Mary Robinson Sheldon (née Seney) (July 3, 1863 – June 16, 1913) was the first female president of the New York Philharmonic. She is credited with reorganizing the orchestra into a modern institution in 1909. One of her major contributions was the hiring of Gustav Mahler.

== Childhood ==
Sheldon was one of nine children, and was born on July 3, 1863, in the Columbia Heights section of Brooklyn (today known as Brooklyn Heights). She was the descendant of men who had been actively involved in the early American republic: Joshua Seney represented Maryland in the Continental Congress and James W. Nicholson was one of the first commodores in the United States Navy. Her grandfather, Robert Seney, was a graduate of Columbia College and a Methodist minister who preached in Astoria (in present-day Queens). His son was the banker, philanthropist, and art collector George Ingraham Seney (1826–92), who was educated at Wesleyan University and New York University. George Seney married Phoebe Augusta Moser, of a prominent Brooklyn family, in 1849.

By the time she was a teenager, the Seney family was living at 4 Montague Terrace in "one of the finest houses in Brooklyn," and her father was the president of the Metropolitan Bank in Manhattan, which was a national institution. Sheldon grew up in a philanthropic family. In 1881, George Seney gave half a million dollars to establish the Methodist Hospital in what is now Park Slope, Brooklyn. That same year, he also gave away eighteen-year-old Mary as the bride of George Rumsey Sheldon, a Harvard graduate who had his own banking firm in New York City.

Within three years, as a result of the Panic of 1884, the Seney family was forced to sell its home as well as auction off nearly 300 of George Seney's fine collection of paintings to pay depositors. Despite this setback, Mary's father still made major charitable contributions to local institutions such as the Industrial Home for Homeless Children, the Eye and Ear Infirmary, the Long Island Historical Society, and the Brooklyn Library. After her father's death in 1892, Mary continued this philanthropic tradition by personally supervising many of these benefactions.

== The New York Philharmonic ==
In 1908, Mary Sheldon was a forty-five-year-old worldly woman with financial and political experience, when she maneuvered to put Mahler on the Philharmonic's podium and determined to build "the greatest orchestra America has ever heard." She had two daughters, kept a yacht at Glen Cove on Long Island, and opened her home in the Murray Hill section of Manhattan's East Side for frequent musicales. Sheldon had watched her husband, a high-level Republican Party official, help put Charles Evans Hughes in the governor's mansion in Albany in 1906 and Theodore Roosevelt and William Howard Taft in the White House in 1904 and 1908.

Her colleagues in the endeavor to reorganize the New York Philharmonic were sixty-year-old Ruth Draper, the daughter of the publisher of the New York Sun and the widow of a prominent professor of clinical medicine at Columbia, Dr. William Draper, who had also been a gifted musician; and Nelson S. Spencer, a fifty-two-year-old pioneer in the artificial silk industry and a public-interest lawyer who had been counsel for Governor Hughes in 1907. Two younger men rounded out the core of Sheldon's group: Henry Lane Eno, at thirty-seven years of age president of the Fifth Avenue Building Co. but far better known in cultural and intellectual circles as a psychologist, poet, and author (his verse play Baglioni was published in 1905); and the European-trained pianist and composer Ernest H. Schelling, age thirty-two, "a connoisseur of books, prints and objects of art", whose wife, Lucy How Draper, had been one of the signatories of the original 1903 plan.

Supporting Sheldon's reorganization efforts were sustaining members of the Guarantors' Committee who made three-year financial pledges. These included wealthy men like John D. Rockefeller, J. Pierpont Morgan, Joseph Pulitzer, August Belmont, Jr., and Thomas Fortune Ryan, but also some formidable women. Harriet (Mrs. Charles Beatty) Alexander and Mary (Mrs. Edward H.) Harriman, both prominent hostesses and philanthropists in their own right, served as Philharmonic Guarantors and, in spite of Walter Damrosch's comments about rich ladies, also as directors of the Symphony Society (so did Henry Lane Eno).

Not least among the women of the Guarantors was Minnie Carl (Mrs. Samuel) Untermyer, the daughter of a German political refugee and the wife of the prominent attorney. Their townhouse at 2 East 54th Street was open to a wide variety of artists, musicians, and statesmen. Untermyer was a delegate to the National Democratic Party conventions in 1904 and 1908 yet when it came to musical matters, political affiliations were set aside. He had served as legal counsel for Damrosch, Sheldon, and others who proposed the takeover of the Philharmonic in 1903. With Mahler in the city, Sheldon now worked with Minnie Untermyer, Ruth Draper, and others to resurrect the 1903 plan. Their Committee for the two Festival Concerts, which evolved into the Philharmonic Guarantors' Committee, drew up a circular letter in April 1908 that declared:

We feel that a man of Mr. Mahler's eminence who has entered so wholly into the spirit of training a really fine orchestra for this City, will have trained the men to such a degree of perfection, that, if in the future, another conductor should have to be considered, this orchestra already formed, shall be of such a standard of excellence as to appeal to other eminent conductors should the moment arise to engage them. Mr. Mahler sees the promise of the very best in orchestral development in this country and it only rests with us to determine whether we will support the best.

Two and a half years later, in November 1910, the Musical Courier confirmed Mary Sheldon's vision. "A woman, forceful as well as tender, with a consuming love of art and a deep love for humanity, has, by the aid of a few friends and her own determination, provided New York with a great orchestra, a thing that never existed until this new combination took matters in hand. Like almost every one who does something extraordinary for the world, this woman, outside of her immediate circle of friends and acquaintances, has not received the appreciation due her. Mrs. George R. Sheldon ... is the lady who has wrought this marvel, and it is high time the American musical public was convinced of the fact."

On May 28, 1912, Mary R. Seney Sheldon became the first woman elected president of the New York Philharmonic, a position not to be held by a woman again for nearly seven decades. She died after a long illness on June 16, 1913, a month shy of her fiftieth birthday, Mahler's age when he died just two years before. As late as May 22, she hosted in her home what was to be the last meeting of the Executive Committee of the Board of Directors before her death. The minutes of their first gathering after her death, in an unusually long tribute, express "the great affection and regard in which she was held by all its members" recording "her untiring services to the Society and the cause of music and ... the immeasurable loss which the Society and the individual members of the Board will suffer in their deprivation of her presence and of her activities."

Sheldon worked both behind the scenes and in the public eye nearly 100 years ago to strengthen the New York Philharmonic financially and artistically. Through her efforts, the sum of $300,000 (equal to $3.4 million today) was raised to support the orchestra at the very moment that Mahler assumed its musical leadership. The confluence of these two achievements was pivotal in the history of the orchestra, setting a new standard of excellence for the future. Mahler's music as interpreted by the New York Philharmonic on their historic CD collection carries Sheldon's legacy into the 21st century.

=== Critics ===
"This agitation seems to have been started by two or three restless women with no occupation and more money than they seem to know what to do with," charged an angry Walter Damrosch in the pages of The New York Times in August 1908. He then dismissed Sheldon and the nascent Philharmonic Guarantors' Committee with the opinion, "There are people to whom music is only food for nervous excitement and each successive European celebrity visiting this country a toy to play with." Damrosch was responding to an interview Sheldon gave to the Times correspondent in Paris, in which she announced that Mahler would conduct a symphony orchestra in New York for the 1909/10 season.

Sheldon had spent the spring of 1908 engaging Mahler for two festival concerts at Carnegie Hall that coming winter. In April she told The New York Times, "Mr. Mahler's influence has been deeply felt at the Metropolitan Opera House this winter and we have to thank Mr. [Heinrich] Conried for bringing him over. While he is here it would be a pity if he should not have a chance to conduct purely orchestral music with an orchestra of his own. Since the idea first came to me I have talked it over with many of my friends, and all of them have been extremely enthusiastic." By the time Sheldon spoke to the press again that summer, she had already been to Munich to solicit advice from Richard Strauss and Felix Mottl about improving the orchestra and, according to the Times, had "already raised a large subscription fund."

What peeved Damrosch, however, was not Sheldon's interest in Mahler. It was her claim that "New York orchestras at present are not worthy" and her determination "to go ahead and form another" that would be "the greatest orchestra America has ever heard." Damrosch was no doubt aggravated to read Sheldon's account of a meeting in May with Richard Arnold, revealing that the thought of a third symphony orchestra in New York had made the Philharmonic Society nervous. According to Sheldon, Arnold reportedly said: "There is not room for another orchestra in New York; let's put the two organizations together and let Mahler conduct our orchestra."

If the story is true, Sheldon must have been delighted at Arnold's capitulation to a plan she and several other wealthy New Yorkers (along with Walter Damrosch) had put forward as early as 1903 and which the orchestra—taking exception to the idea of giving up control of the organization's finances—rejected. On the other hand, it is possible that Sheldon had just executed a clever political maneuver to pressure the Philharmonic to come around to her point of view. Offering the Philharmonic to Mahler in 1909–10 came as a surprise to Times, which was under the impression that the Orchestra had committed to Wassily Safonoff. Sheldon took the opportunity of this Times interview to clearly restate the Guarantors' prerequisites:

It would be necessary to make many changes in the organization. The strings, I think, could scarcely be improved, but some of the other parts would have to be reinforced. Then a certain number of our board would have to be placed on the Philharmonic board ... [As Strauss and Mottl suggested,] it would be best to plan the season of our orchestra to last thirty weeks, and that is another arrangement which must be made with the Philharmonic, as their present season lasts only sixteen ... I shall see Mr. Arnold immediately upon my return. It would be a great help to start with the Philharmonic as a nucleus.

That winter the rumor mill abounded with reports of the potential rehabilitation of the Philharmonic. Sheldon was coy with the press; on December 9, 1908, the New York Sun wrote that she was "not quite ready to give out" details. Two days later, in a letter to the editor of the Times, Sheldon revealed what, on the surface, seemed to be a fundamental shift in her thinking since April: "So far as we can see there is nothing 'hysterical' about this plan, but a plain and commonsense attempt to save something that is very well worth saving, and benefiting thereby the musical life of New York. Nor is it, I may say, an attempt to form an orchestra for the benefit of any one conductor." The phoenix of the 1903 plan was rising from the ashes!

By February of the following year, Sheldon's proposed restructuring had indeed been accepted, paving the way for Mahler's engagement with the Philharmonic beginning in the autumn of 1909. The historic reorganization plan was signed by Mary and George Sheldon, Ruth Dana Draper, Henry Lane Eno, Ernest H. Schelling, and Nelson S. Spencer. Walter Damrosch's characterization of the Guarantors as "two or three restless women with no occupation and more money than they seem to know what to do with," as well as Loudon Charlton's remark that Mahler's subsequent troubles with the Guarantors were the result of "too many women," obscure the intelligence, business acumen, political savvy, and cultural sophistication of these women and men.

== Personal life ==
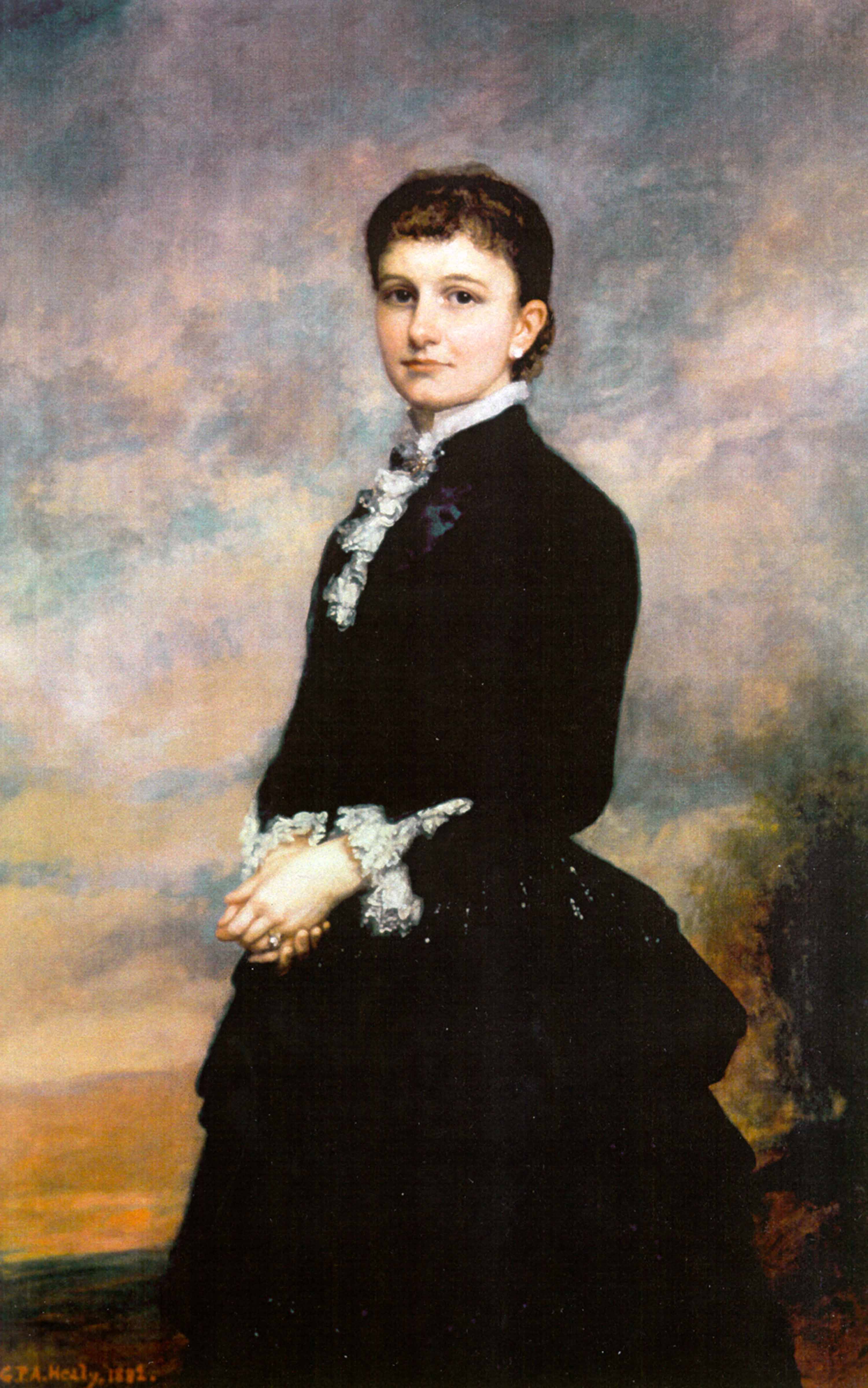
Engagement portrait for the 18-year-old Mary Seney, later Mrs. Sheldon, painted by G. P. A. Healy in 1881

In December 1881, Mary was married to George R. Sheldon (1863–1913), a son of William Crawford Sheldon and Mary Eliza (née DeForest) Sheldon. George was a banker who served as treasurer of the Republican National Committee. Together, they lived at 24 East 38th Street in Manhattan and were the parents of:

- Mary Seney Sheldon (b. 1885), who married William Fuller in 1904; they later divorced, and she married Harvard Law graduate and Police Magistrate Daniel F. Murphy. After his death in 1937, she married Col. Arthur W. Little of Baltimore in 1941.
- Gertrude Alison Sheldon (1888–1969), who married banker Samuel Stevens Sands III (1884–1913), a son of Anne Harriman (the second wife of William Kissam Vanderbilt) and Samuel Stevens Sands II, in 1910. After his death, she married Richard Whitney, a president of the New York Stock Exchange (who was later convicted of embezzling), in 1916.

She died at her home after a long illness on June 16, 1913, a month shy of her fiftieth birthday.
