= Jackson County Courthouse (Georgia) =

- U.S. National Register of Historic Places
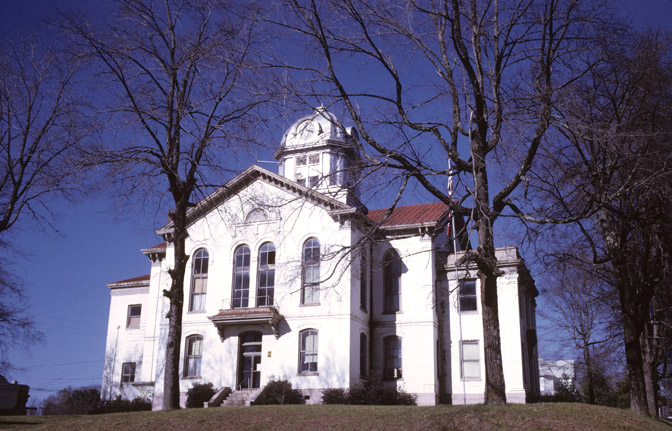
- Jackson County Courthouse, photographed c. 1970

- Location within Georgia Location within the United States
- Location: 85 Washington St., Jefferson, Georgia
- Coordinates: 34°7′6″N 83°34′28″W
- Built: 1879, 1906 (clock tower), 1978 (renovations)
- Built by: M.B. McGinty
- Architect: Thomas, W.W.
- Architectural style: Neoclassical
- MPS: Georgia County Courthouses TR
- NRHP reference No.: 80001096
- Added to NRHP: September 18, 1980

Jackson County Courthouse is a two-story brick building designed by architect W.W. Thomas and built in 1879 in Jefferson, Georgia. Its Classical Revival clock tower was added in 1906. It was one of the first post-Civil War county courthouses built in Georgia. It is unusual for surviving little-altered since construction. In 2004, a new courthouse was built in Jefferson.

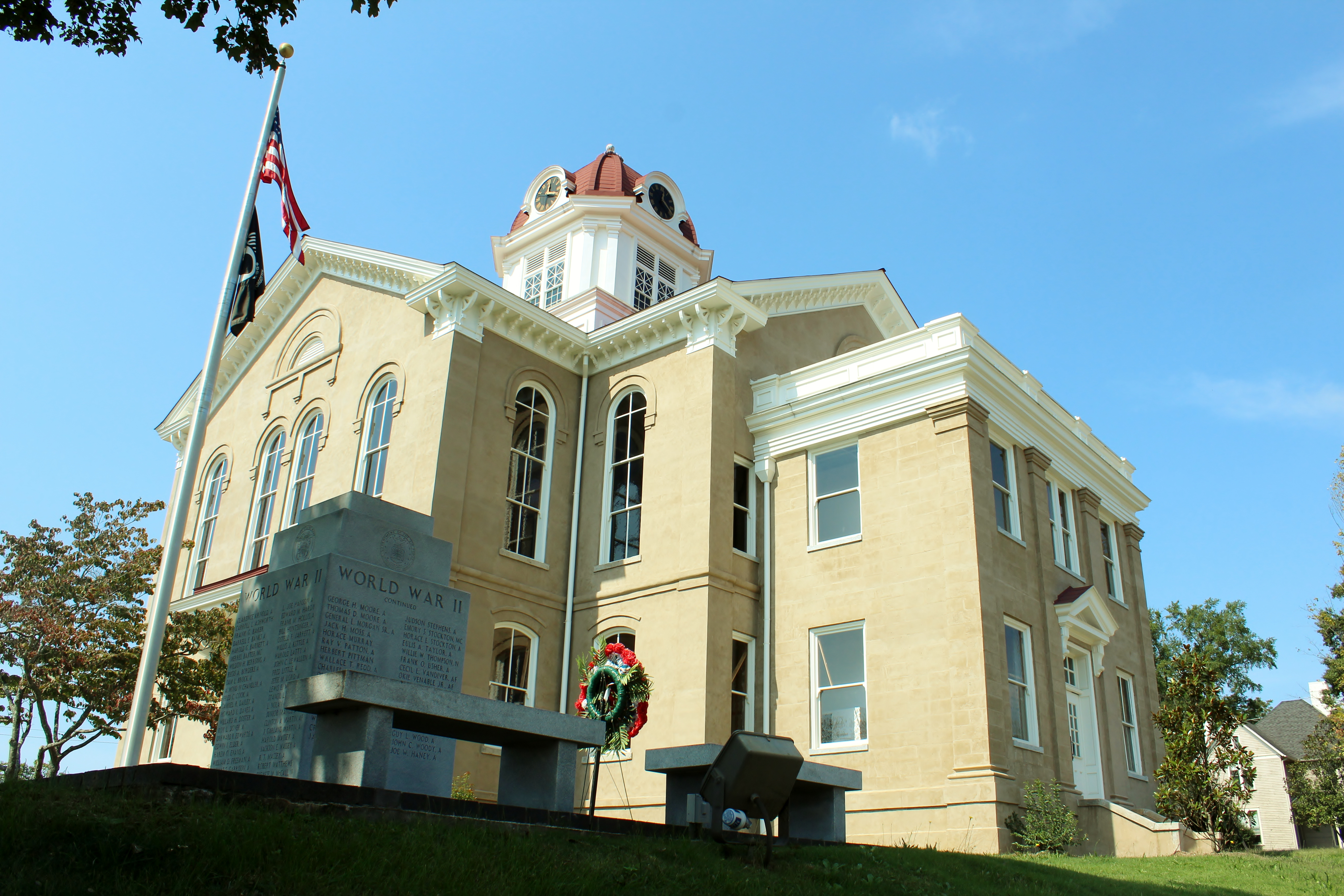
Courthouse in 2012

It was renovated in 1978.

Its courtroom has a "Cathedral quilt" pressed metal coved ceiling and egg and dart cornices.

Its architect, William Winstead Thomas (1848-1904), was president of an insurance company but also designed buildings, including the White Hall estate house outside Atlanta and at least two other courthouses.

It was listed on the National Register of Historic Places in 1980.
