= McDaniel Street Historic District =

Historic district in Georgia, United States

- U.S. National Register of Historic Places
- Location within Georgia
- Location: S. Broad and McDaniel Sts., Monroe, Georgia
- Coordinates: 33°47′27″N 83°42′56″W
- Area: 32 acres (13 ha)
- Architect: William Winstead Thomes, Francis Boddie Warfield
- Architectural style: Colonial Revival, Late Victorian
- MPS: Monroe MRA
- NRHP reference No.: 83003614
- Added to NRHP: December 28, 1983

The McDaniel Street Historic District in Monroe, Georgia is a 32 acres (13 ha) historic district which was listed on the National Register of Historic Places in 1983. The listing included 13 contributing buildings and 1 contributing site.

It includes the McDaniel-Tichenor House, which is separately listed on the National Register.
