= George R. Sheldon =

American financier and businessman

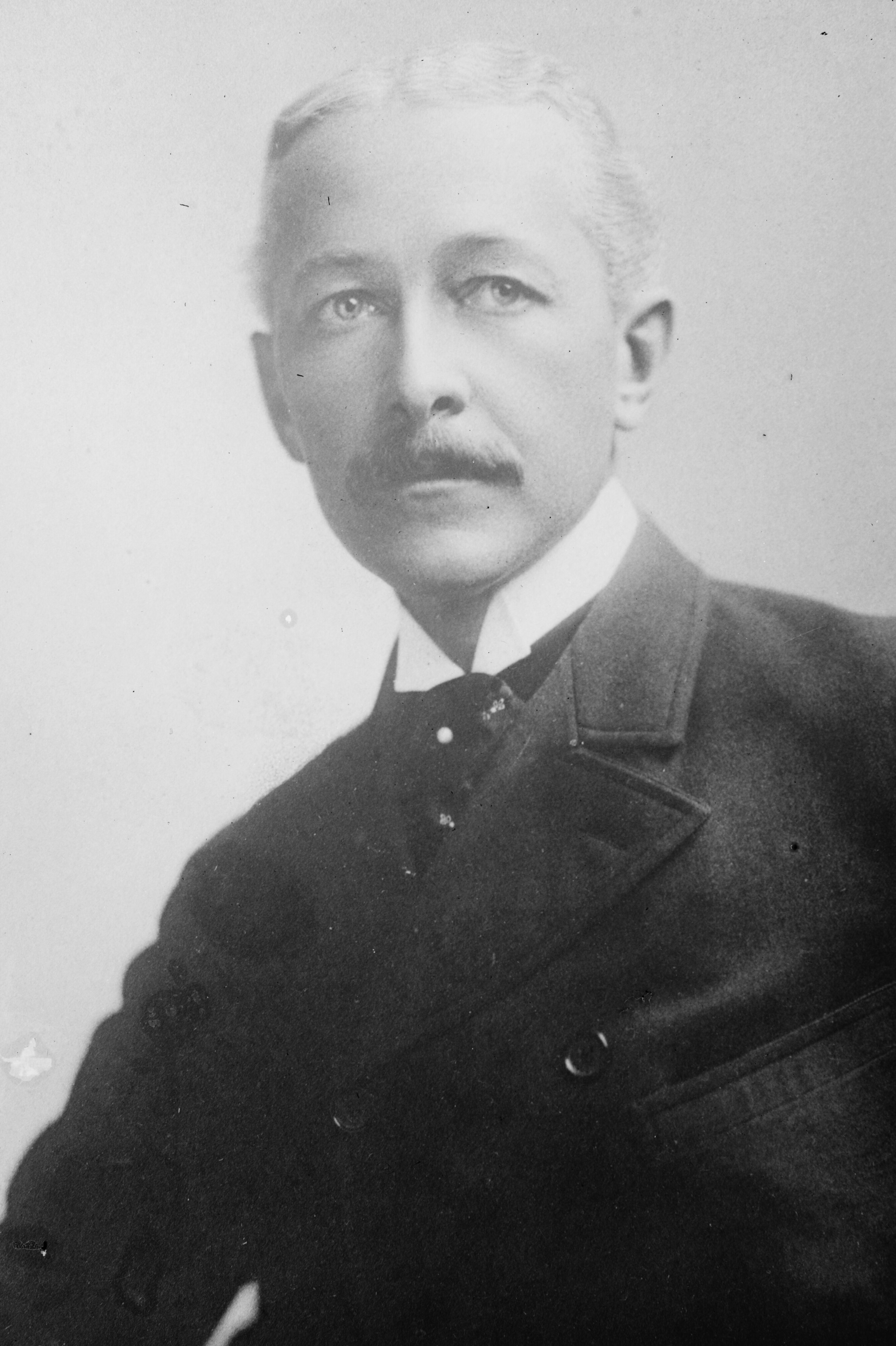
- Born: George Rumsey Sheldon; April 16, 1857; Brooklyn, New York, United States
- Died: January 14, 1919 (aged 61); Carbondale, Illinois
- Education: St. Paul's School
- Alma mater: Harvard College
- Spouse: Mary Robinson Seney (m. 1881; death 1913)
- Parent(s): William Crawford Sheldon; Mary Eliza DeForest

George Rumsey Sheldon (April 16, 1857 – January 14, 1919) was an American banker and businessman. He was a leading force in the Trust Company of America and was a director numerous railroads and power companies. He served as treasurer of the Republican National Committee.

== Early life ==
Sheldon was born on April 16, 1857, in Brooklyn, New York. He was a son of William Crawford Sheldon and Mary Eliza (née DeForest) Sheldon. Among his siblings were Catherine "Kate" DeForest Sheldon (wife of Alfred Craven Harrison), Ella Crawford Sheldon (wife of William Saterlee Packer Prentice), and fellow banker William Crawford Sheldon. His niece was Mildred, Countess von Holstein.

Sheldon was a graduate of St. Paul's School in Concord, New Hampshire, before he attended Harvard College, graduating with the class of 1870.

== Career ==
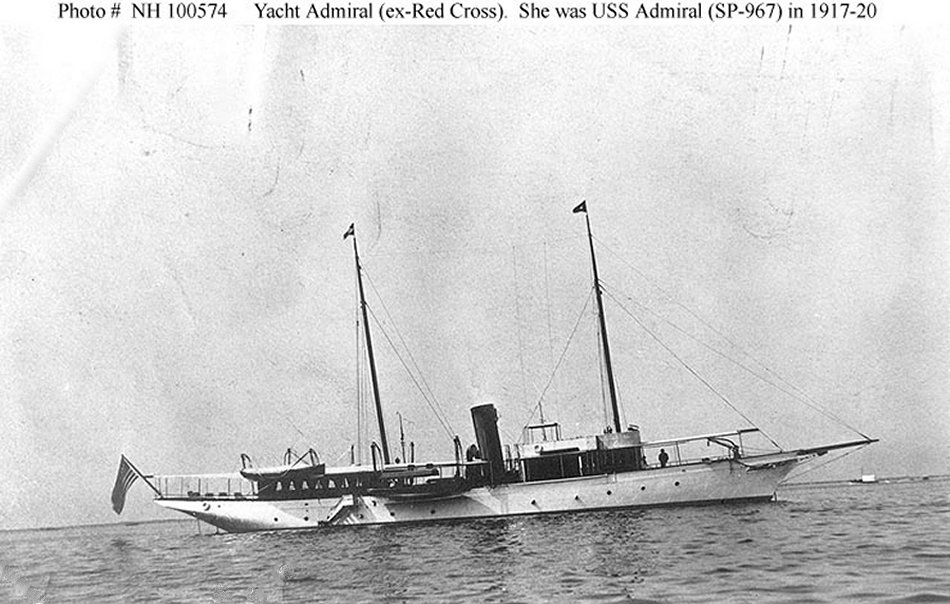
Sheldon's yacht, later known as USS Admiral

Immediately after Harvard, Sheldon started in banking, and opened his own firm in New York City, gradually branching out into other enterprises and becoming closely associated with J. Pierpont Morgan. He also established the Franklin Sugar Company, which imported and refined sugar in Pennsylvania. He was a leading force in the Trust Company of America.

He was also part of what became known as the Grape Sugar Trust, along with Hiram Bond, Thomas C. Platt, and his brother-in-law, William W. Frazier.

At the time of his death, he was a director of eighteen corporations including the American Locomotive Company, the Bethlehem Steel Company, the North American Company, the Milwaukee Electric Railway and Light Company, the Electric Securities Company, the Detroit Edison Company, the Mechanics and Metals National Bank, the Union Electric Light Company of St. Louis, the Cincinnati Northern Railway Company, the West Kentucky Coal Company and the Wisconsin Edison Company.

=== Republican politics ===
In 1908 Sheldon was chosen as treasurer of the Republican National Committee and served for eight years. He was credited with "the bringing about of the reconciliation between Theodore Roosevelt and William Howard Taft," which was considered "the greatest achievement on behalf of his party, as it disposed of the Progressive Party and brought into line all the Republican factions, making possible" the wins in 1918.

== Personal life ==
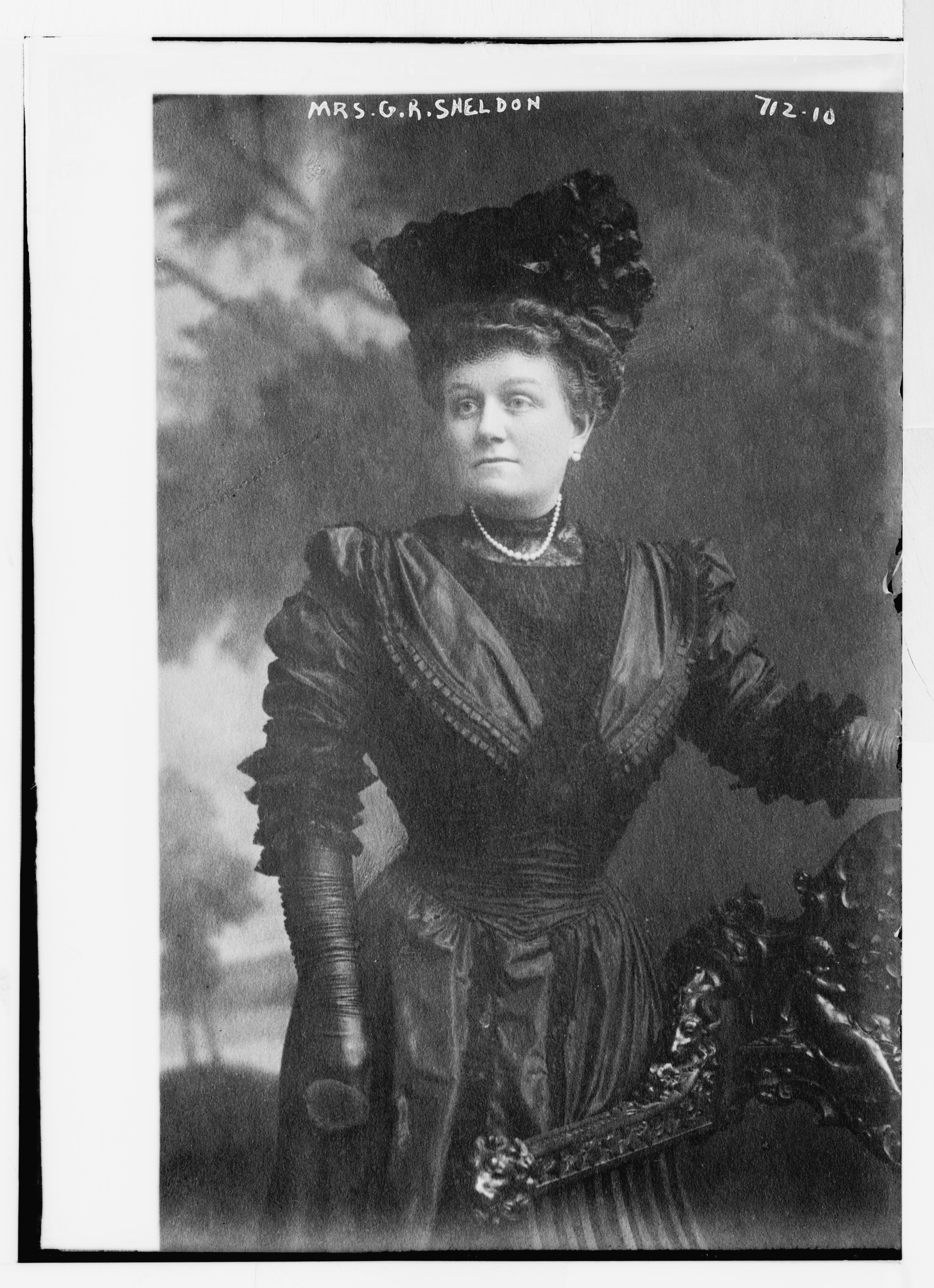
Photograph of his wife, Mary Seney Sheldon

In December 1881 Sheldon was married to Mary Robinson Seney (1863–1913), a daughter of George I. Seney, also of Brooklyn. Mary was the first female president of the New York Philharmonic and is credited with reorganizing the orchestra into a modern institution in 1909 and hiring Gustav Mahler. Together, they lived at 24 East 38th Street in Manhattan and were the parents of:

- Mary Seney Sheldon (b. 1885), who married William Fuller in 1904; they later divorced, and she married Harvard Law graduate and Police Magistrate Daniel F. Murphy. After his death in 1937, she married Col. Arthur W. Little of Baltimore in 1941.
- Gertrude Alison Sheldon (1888–1969), who married banker Samuel Stevens Sands III (1884–1913), a son of Anne Harriman (the second wife of William Kissam Vanderbilt) and Samuel Stevens Sands II, in 1910. After his death, she married embezzler Richard Whitney, a president of the New York Stock Exchange, in 1916.

He was president of the prestigious Union League Club in New York and, in 1903, purchased the 45-acre country estate of J. Harvey Ladew in Glen Cove, New York, on Hempstead Harbor.

His wife died at their home on June 16, 1913. Sheldon died on January 14, 1919, in Carbondale in Jackson County, Illinois, from injuries he suffered when inspecting a coal mine there.
