= USS Admiral (SP-967) =

Patrol vessel of the United States Navy

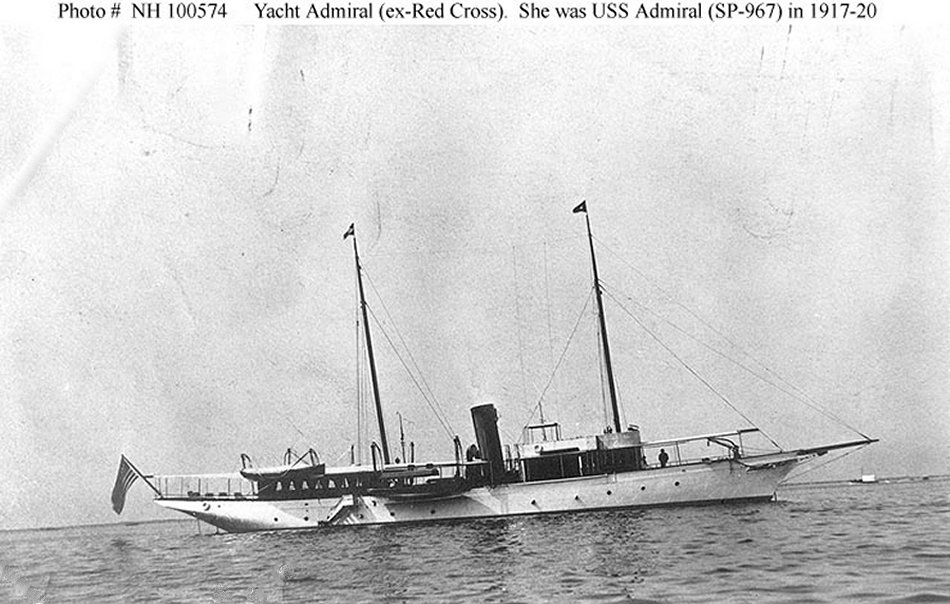
- Admiral photographed prior to World War I.

History

United States
- Name: USS Admiral (SP-967)
- Launched: 1892 as the yacht Red Cross at East Providence, RI
- Acquired: 5 July 1917
- Commissioned: USS Admiral (SP 967), 7 August 1917
- Decommissioned: 26 March 1918
- Recommissioned: 1 August 1918
- Decommissioned: 13 May 1919
- Stricken: 7 May 1919
- Fate: Sold 29 October 1920 to E. N. Goodsell of Plattsburgh, NY. Fate unknown.

General characteristics
- Displacement: 123 t
- Length: 137 ft (42 m)
- Beam: 20 ft 7 in (6.27 m)
- Draft: 7 ft 6 in (2.29 m)
- Speed: 12 knots
- Complement: 24
- Armament: two 3-pounders, two .30 cal. Colt machine guns, and one "Y" gun.

The wooden-hulled screw steam yacht Red Cross was completed in 1892 at East Providence, RI, and by 1907 had been renamed Admiral. At that time, the yacht was owned by the banker, George Rumsey Sheldon. She was next owned by Irving T. Bush (1869–1948), the founder and creator of the famed Bush Terminal in South Brooklyn, NY, before being acquired by the president of the Submarine Signal Co., of New London, Gordon Dexter (1864–1937) about 1914.

When the United States entered World War I, the American Navy sought ships to perform a variety of tasks, including local patrol. The Navy acquired Admiral from Gordon Dexter on 5 July 1917, and placed her in commission at Lawley's Ship Yard, Boston, Mass., on 7 August 1917.

Admiral, given the classification SP-967, performed routine patrol duty in the 1st Naval District through the winter of 1917 and 1918. In the course of her operations toward the end of that period, the yacht cast off from Commonwealth Pier, at the Boston Section Base, at 0055 on 26 March 1918, with one petty officer and eight enlisted men of a naval port guard detachment embarked for passage to Plymouth. Admiral proceeded uneventfully south by east until 0420, when she struck a boulder off Brant Rock, near the town of Scituate, Massachusetts, and began shipping water.

Within the hour, the situation on board had worsened to the point that the pumps could no longer hold their own against the in-rushing water. The nearby life-saving stations at Brant Rock and Gurnet dispatched boats to the scene and took off the port guard detachment and 17 men of the crew as well. Admiral herself sent a boat ashore to obtain help at 0530. The latter returned with the two Coast Guard boats soon thereafter, while Admiral's remaining men expeditiously offloaded ammunition, fittings, and stores into the ship's lifeboats, dory, and cutter. Ultimately, at 0755, Admiral sank in 11 fathoms of water.

After being raised and refitted for service, Admiral was placed in commission at Baker's Yacht Basin, Quincy, Mass., on 1 August 1918 and assigned to "Group 2, Minesweepers," in the 1st Naval District's Boston section. She soon resumed patrol operations and continued this duty through February 1919, ranging from her section base at Boston to Rockland, Maine, and the Portsmouth, NH Navy Yard. Struck from the Navy list on 7 May 1919, in General Order No. 295, Admiral was decommissioned at Baker's Yacht Basin on 13 May 1919, and ultimately sold to E. N. Goodsell of Pittsburgh, N.Y., on 29 October 1920.
