= Josephine Wilkins =

American activist

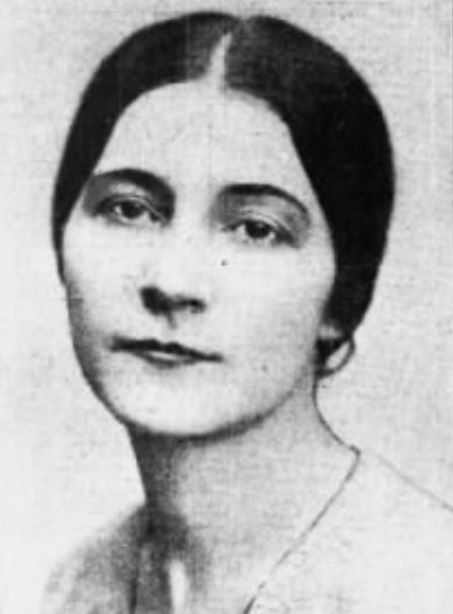
- Wilkins in 1934
- Born: Josephine Mathewson Wilkins; September 30, 1893; Athens, Georgia, U.S.
- Died: May 30, 1977 (aged 83); Port Charlotte, Florida, U.S.

Josephine Mathewson Wilkins (September 30, 1893 – May 30, 1977) was an American social activist, president of the Georgia State League of Women Voters. She is a 2022 inductee into the Georgia Women of Achievement.

== Early life ==
Josephine Mathewson Wilkins was born in Athens, Georgia, the daughter of banker John Julian Wilkins Sr., and Jessie Stanley Horton Wilkins. She attended school at the Lucy Cobb Institute in Athens, and earned a bachelor's degree at the University of Georgia. She pursued further studies in the arts in New York City, where she took courses at Columbia University.

Facts versus folklore : an adventure in democracy / Josephine Wilkins

== Career ==
Wilkins began working for the Georgia Children's Code Commission on child labor legislation in 1925. When the child labor bill passed, Franklin Roosevelt wired his congratulations to Wilkins personally. In 1933, she was part of a citizens' committee to address police brutality towards Black residents of Atlanta. She was elected president of the Georgia State League of Women Voters in 1934. "Such an organization takes on new meaning in this period of confusion," she declared in her acceptance speech, "when the tendency to dictatorship is more the rule than the exception, and we in the United States seek to prove that our form of self-government is flexible enough to effect such changes as we may want through the orderly process of the ballot". She retired from the League presidency in 1940.

Wilkins worked with Governor Ellis Arnall with a grant from the Rosenwald Fund, to create the Georgia Citizens Fact-Finding Movement, an umbrella organization for reform efforts. She worked on anti-lynching laws with Jessie Daniel Ames, and helped to found and lead the Southern Regional Council in the 1940s.

From 1954 until her death, she was president of Wilkins, Inc., overseeing her family's business interests and philanthropic work. In 1973, she gave an oral history interview to Jacquelyn Dowd Hall for the Southern Oral History Program Collection at the University of North Carolina.

== Personal life ==
Wilkins died in Port Charlotte, Florida in 1977, aged 83 years. Her papers were donated to Emory University by her nephews in 1978.
