= Mary Ann Lipscomb =

American educator (1848–1918)

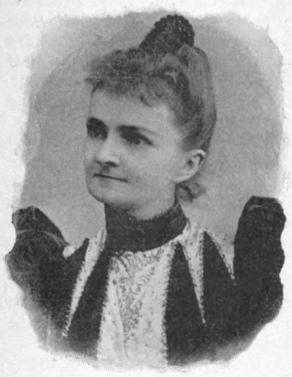
- Born: Mary Ann Rutherford; December 23, 1848; Athens, Georgia, US
- Died: September 13, 1918 (aged 69); Athens, Georgia, US
- Occupation: Educator
- Spouse: Frank Adgate Lipscomb (m. 1869; died 1874)
- Children: 3
- Relatives: Mildred Lewis Rutherford (sister)

Mary Ann Rutherford Lipscomb (1848–1918) was an American educator. She believed in childhood education, and she helped make primary education required for all children in Georgia.

== Biography ==
Mary Ann Rutherford was born in Athens, Georgia on December 23, 1848. She married Frank Adgate Lipscomb in 1869, and they had three children. He died in 1874.

After she was widowed, Lipscomb went to work at the Lucy Cobb Institute, under the direction of her sister, Mildred Lewis Rutherford; in 1895, Lipscomb took over leadership of that school. Lipscomb founded the Tallulah Falls School in 1909.

She died at her home in Athens on September 13, 1918.

Both Lipscomb and Rutherford have student dormitories named after them at the University of Georgia. Lipscomb was named a Georgia Woman of Achievement in 2010.
