= Lucy Cobb Institute =

Girls school in Athens, Georgia, US (1859–1931)

- 200 Block, North Milledge Avenue; Athens, Georgia; United States

Information
- Established: 1859
- Founder: Thomas R. R. Cobb
- Closed: 1931
- Lucy Cobb Institute Campus
- U.S. National Register of Historic Places
- U.S. Historic district
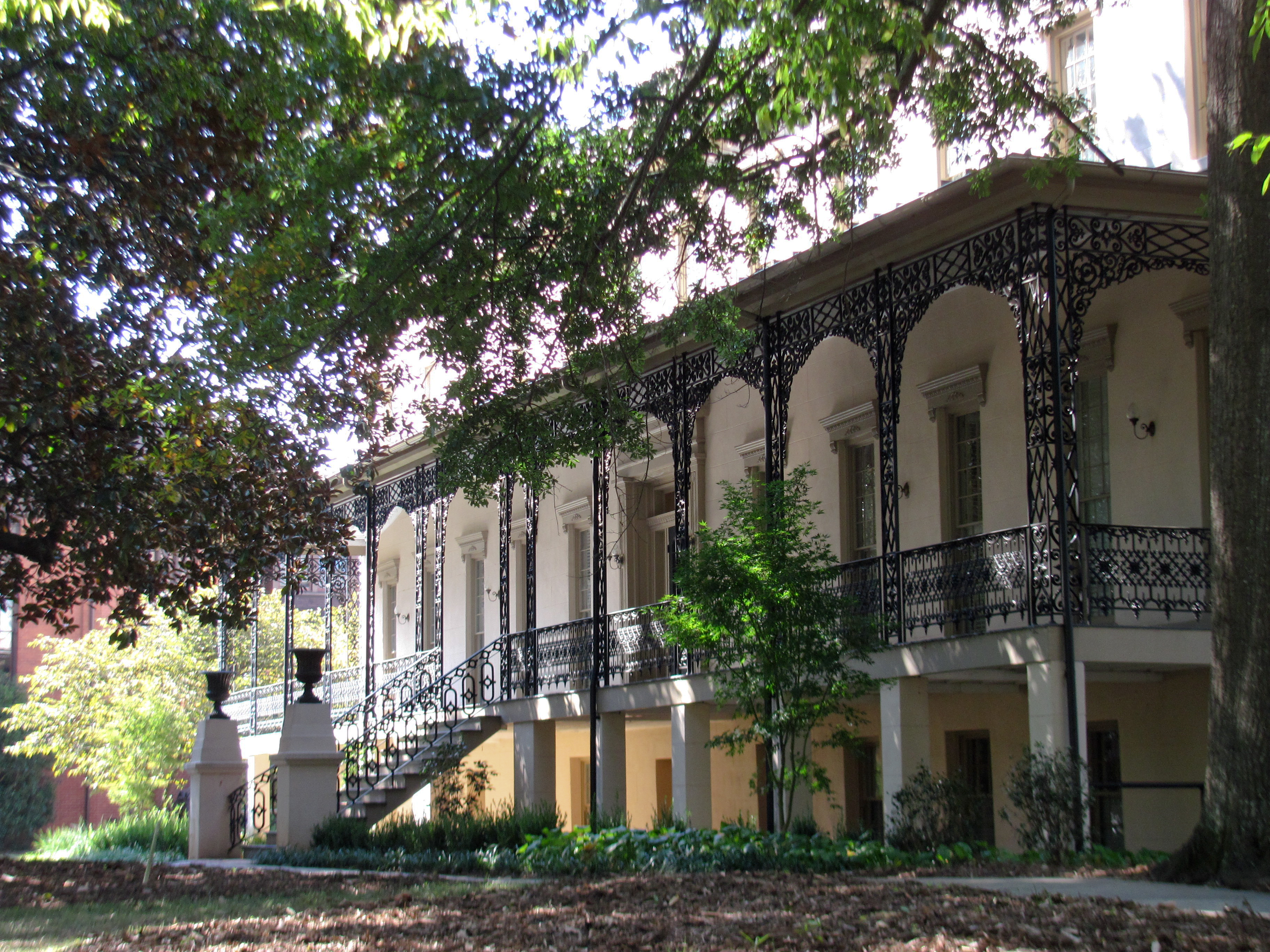

- Location within Georgia Location within the United States
- Location: 200 N. Milledge Ave., University of Georgia campus, Athens, Georgia
- Coordinates: 33°57′22″N 83°23′23″W
- Built: 1858
- Architect: W. W. Thomas
- Architectural style: Early Republic, Octagon Mode, Regency
- NRHP reference No.: 72000377
- Added to NRHP: March 16, 1972

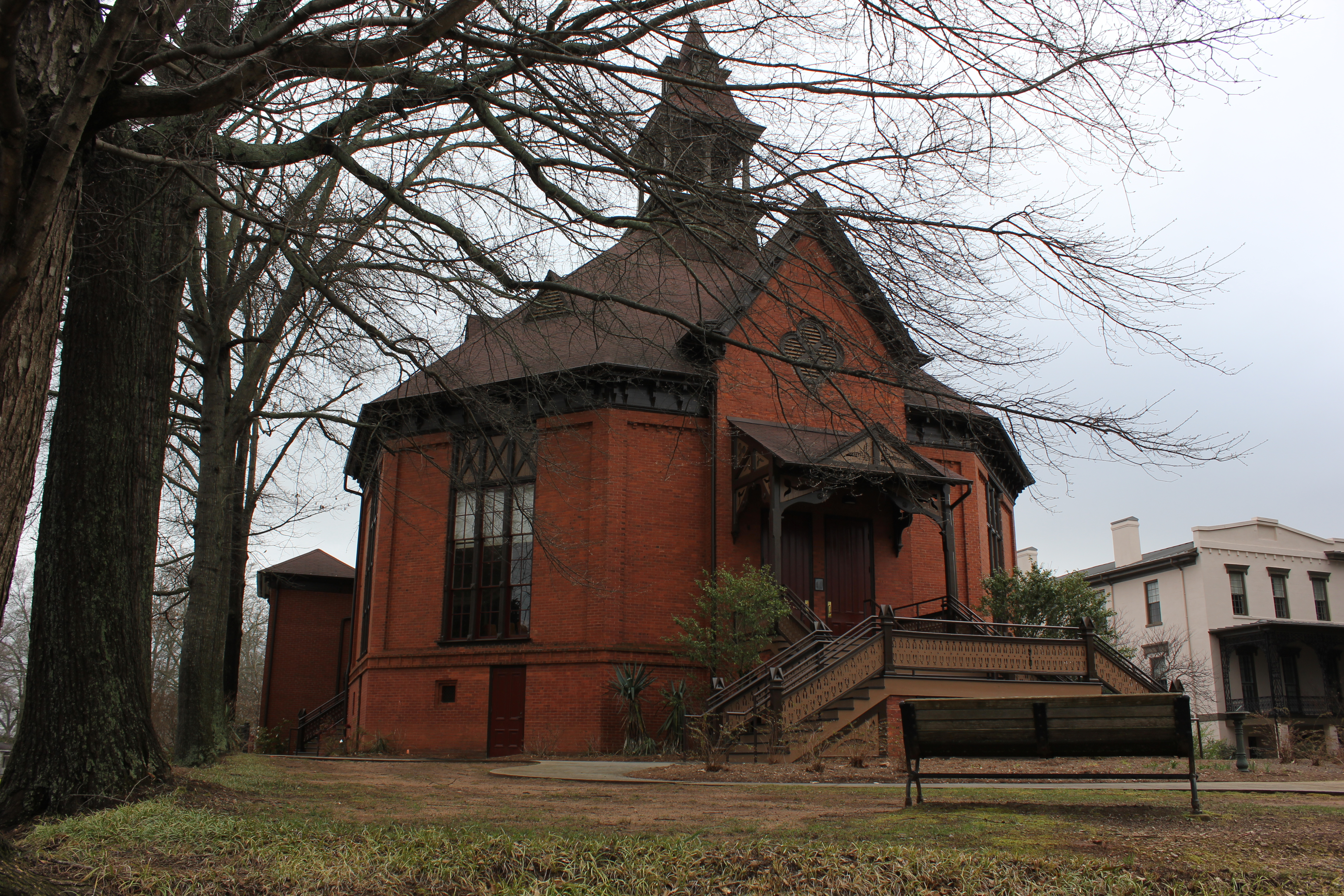
Seney–Stovall Chapel

The Lucy Cobb Institute was a girls' school on Milledge Avenue in Athens, Georgia, United States. It was founded by Thomas R. R. Cobb, and named in honor of his daughter, who had died of scarlet fever at age 14, shortly before construction was completed and doors opened; it was incorporated in 1859. The cornerstone for the Seney–Stovall Chapel was laid in May 1882, and the octagonal building was dedicated in 1885. The school closed in 1931.

The campus of the Lucy Cobb Institute was listed on the National Register of Historic Places on March 16, 1972. Today, the Carl Vinson Institute of Government of the University of Georgia is housed in the former Lucy Cobb Institute.

== History ==
=== Background ===
In 1854, a piece called "The Education of Our Girls" ran in a local paper, the Athens Watchman. The letter was written by Laura Cobb (Mrs. Williams) Rutherford, who was "writing from a ladylike modesty" about the poor state of education for women in the South. It was signed "Mother" and argued, "girls have the same intellectual constitution as men and have the same right as men to intellectual cultural development". One of the letter's readers was Mrs. Rutherford's brother, Thomas R. R. Cobb, the father of several daughters. Cobb, a lawyer, was completely unaware of the author's identity and after reading the editorial began raising funds for a girls' school.

=== School opens ===
The trustees purchased eight acres of land on what is now known as Milledge Avenue. When the school opened on January 10, 1859, its first principal was R. M. Wright. (It was in April of this same year the Watkinsville Road acquired its present name of Milledge Avenue.) The school was later headed by Madame Sosnowski (who organized the Home School after leaving the Lucy Cobb Institute).

Mildred Lewis Rutherford, or "Miss Millie", a graduate herself of Lucy Cobb Institute and a prominent white supremacist speaker, took over leadership of the school in 1880. The Georgia Writers' Project, in a 1940 publication on the state published in the American Guide Series, characterized her thusly:

'Miss Millie,' always a champion of southern traditions, was a woman of powerful personality, commanding presence, and fearlessly outspoken opinions; she was known widely for the speeches she delivered in hoop skirts.

=== Seney–Stovall Chapel ===
It was Miss Millie who decided the girls needed a chapel and had them write seeking funding for one. In 1881, Nellie Stovall wrote "a beautiful and girlish letter" to George I. Seney, who responded with the funding for the $10,000 structure, an octagonal red brick building called the Seney-Stovall Chapel. It was designed by a local architect William Winstead Thomas.

When Miss Millie stepped down from the role of principal in 1895, she was replaced at the school's helm by her sister, Mrs. M.A. Lipscomb. Rutherford and Lipscomb were nieces of T. R. R. Cobb.

In 1986, R.E.M. recorded two songs in the chapel for the documentary Athens, GA: Inside/Out.

=== The end ===
Although the institute "became a well-known girls' preparatory school", "praised throughout the South for its emphasis on gentle manners and old-fashioned accomplishments", it "did not survive the depression", and closed its doors in 1931. At that point, the University of Georgia took over its campus, and used the main building as a women's dormitory and eventually storage.

A restoration effort to save the complex was completed in 1997 with the renovation of Seney-Stovall Chapel. The former Lucy Cobb Institute became the home of the Carl Vinson Institute of Government.

== Notable alumnae ==
- Susan Cobb Milton Atkinson
- Sarah Johnson Cocke
- Julia Flisch
- Moina Michael
- Caroline Love Goodwin O'Day
- Letitia Dowdell Ross
- Mildred Lewis Rutherford
- Fay Webb-Gardner
- Josephine Wilkins
