= Richard Whitney (financier) =

American financier and convicted embezzler

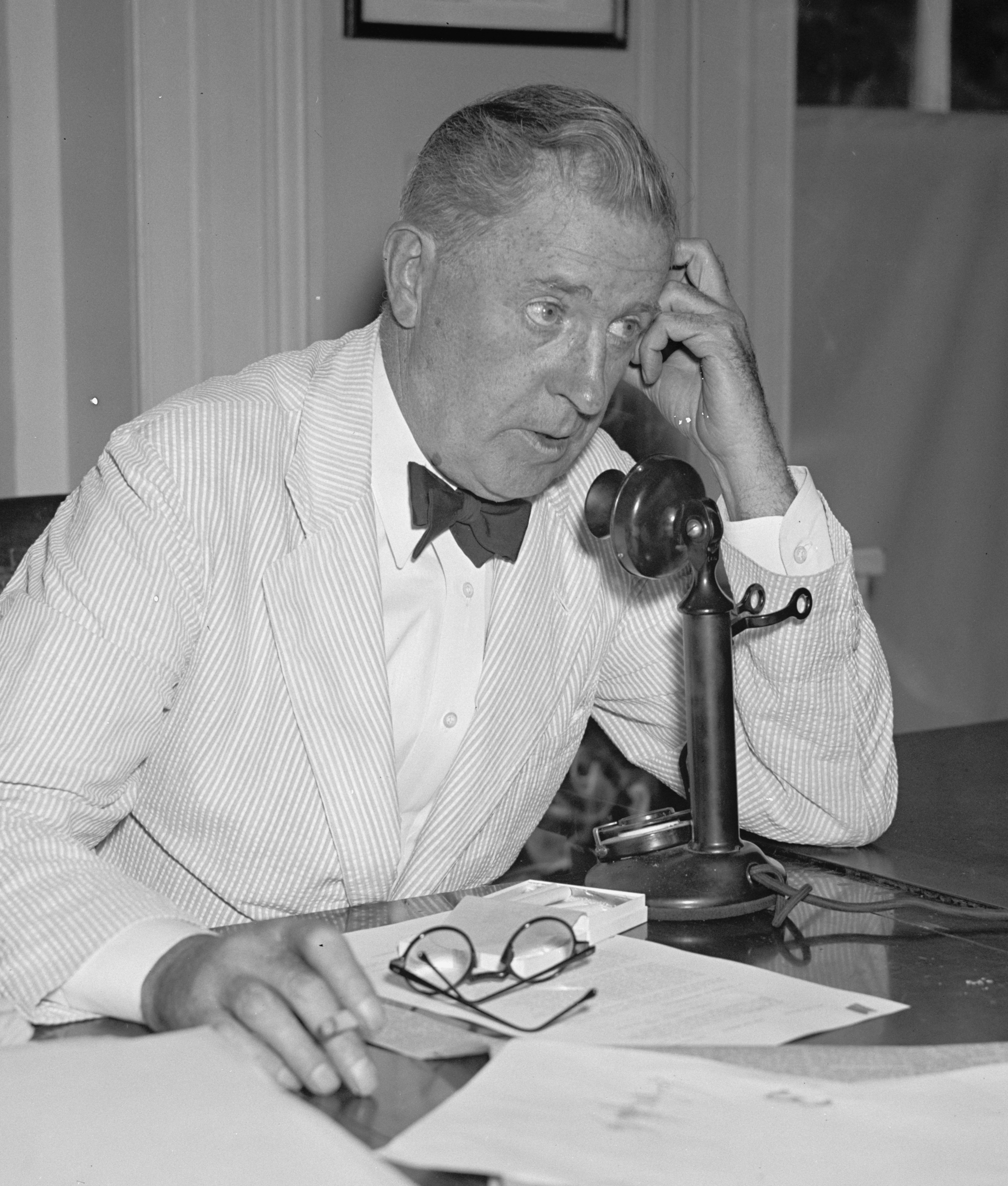
- Whitney, 1937

President of the New York Stock Exchange
- In office 1930–1935
- Preceded by: Edward H. H. Simmons
- Succeeded by: Charles R. Gay

Personal details
- Born: August 1, 1888 Boston, Massachusetts
- Died: December 5, 1974 (aged 86) Far Hills, New Jersey, U.S.
- Spouse: Gertrude Sheldon Sands (after 1916)
- Children: 3
- Education: Groton School
- Alma mater: Harvard University

Richard Whitney (August 1, 1888 – December 5, 1974) was an American financier and president of the New York Stock Exchange from 1930 to 1935. He was later convicted of embezzlement and imprisoned.

== Early life ==
Whitney was born on August 1, 1888, in Boston, Massachusetts. He was a son of Elizabeth Whitney, who was a daughter of William M. Whitney, and George Whitney Sr. His father, a descendant of John Whitney, was president of North National Union Bank.

Richard and his older brother George Whitney Jr. (who later married Martha Beatrix Bacon, daughter of U.S. Secretary of State and Ambassador to France Robert Bacon) were educated at Groton School (where he was captain of the baseball team and school prefect) and Harvard University (where he was tapped for membership in the Porcellian Club).

== Career ==
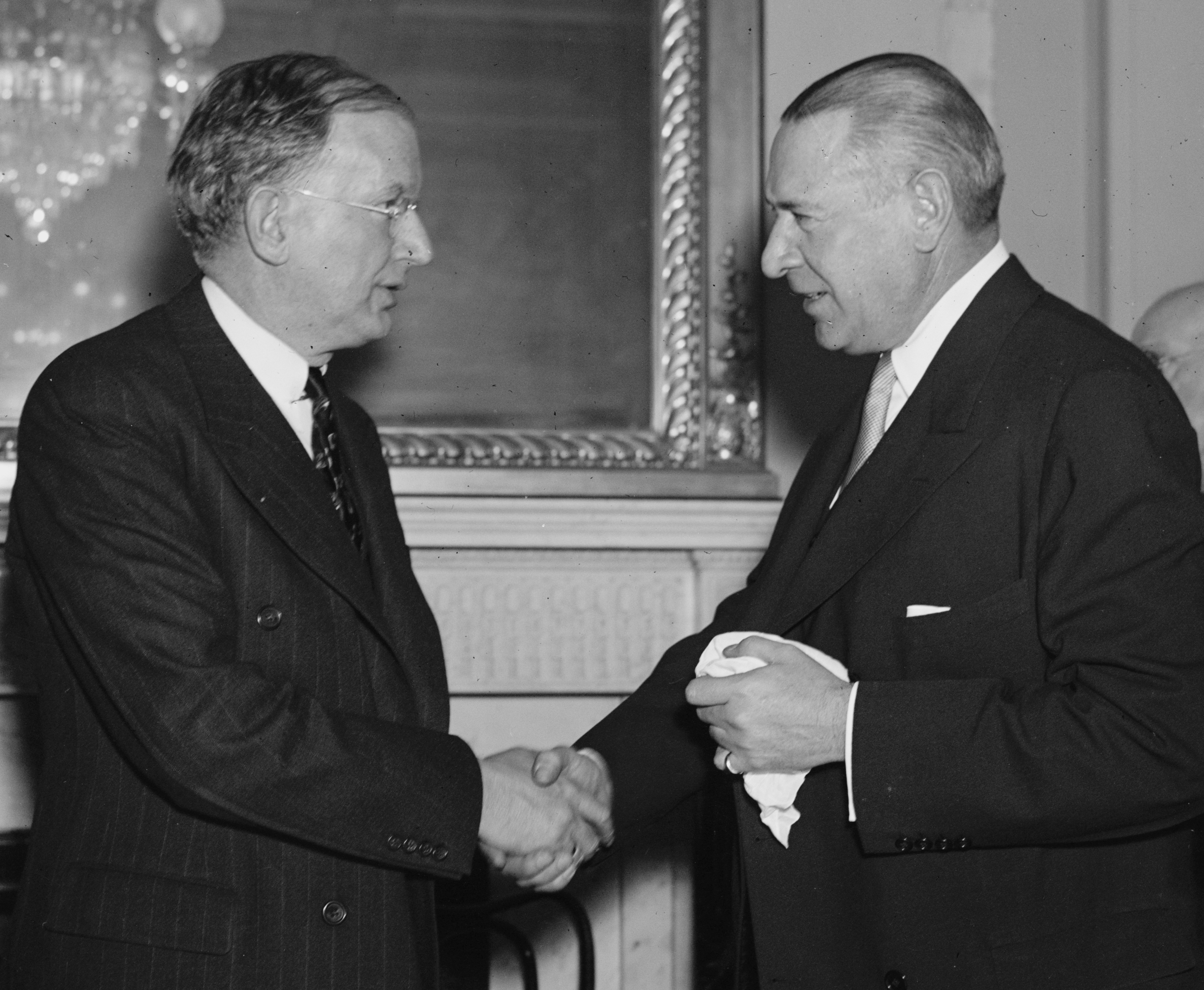
Sen. Burton Wheeler (left) greets Whitney in 1937.

On October 24, 1929, Black Thursday, he attempted to avert the Wall Street crash of 1929. Alarmed by rapidly falling stock prices, several leading Wall Street bankers met to find a solution to the panic and chaos on the trading floor of the New York Stock Exchange. The meeting included Thomas W. Lamont, acting head of Morgan Bank; Albert Wiggin, head of the Chase National Bank; and Charles E. Mitchell, president of the National City Bank of New York. They chose Whitney, then vice president of the Exchange, to act on their behalf.

With the bankers' financial resources behind him, Whitney went onto the floor of the Exchange and ostentatiously placed a bid to purchase 25,000 shares of U.S. Steel at $205 each, a price well above the current market. As traders watched, Whitney then placed similar bids on other "blue chip" stocks. This tactic was similar to a tactic that had ended the Panic of 1907, and succeeded in halting the slide that day. The Dow Jones Industrial Average recovered with a slight increase, closing with it down only 6.38 points for that day. In this case, however, the respite was only temporary; stocks subsequently collapsed catastrophically on Black Tuesday, October 29. Whitney's actions gained him the sobriquet, "White Knight of Wall Street."

=== Downfall and prison sentence ===
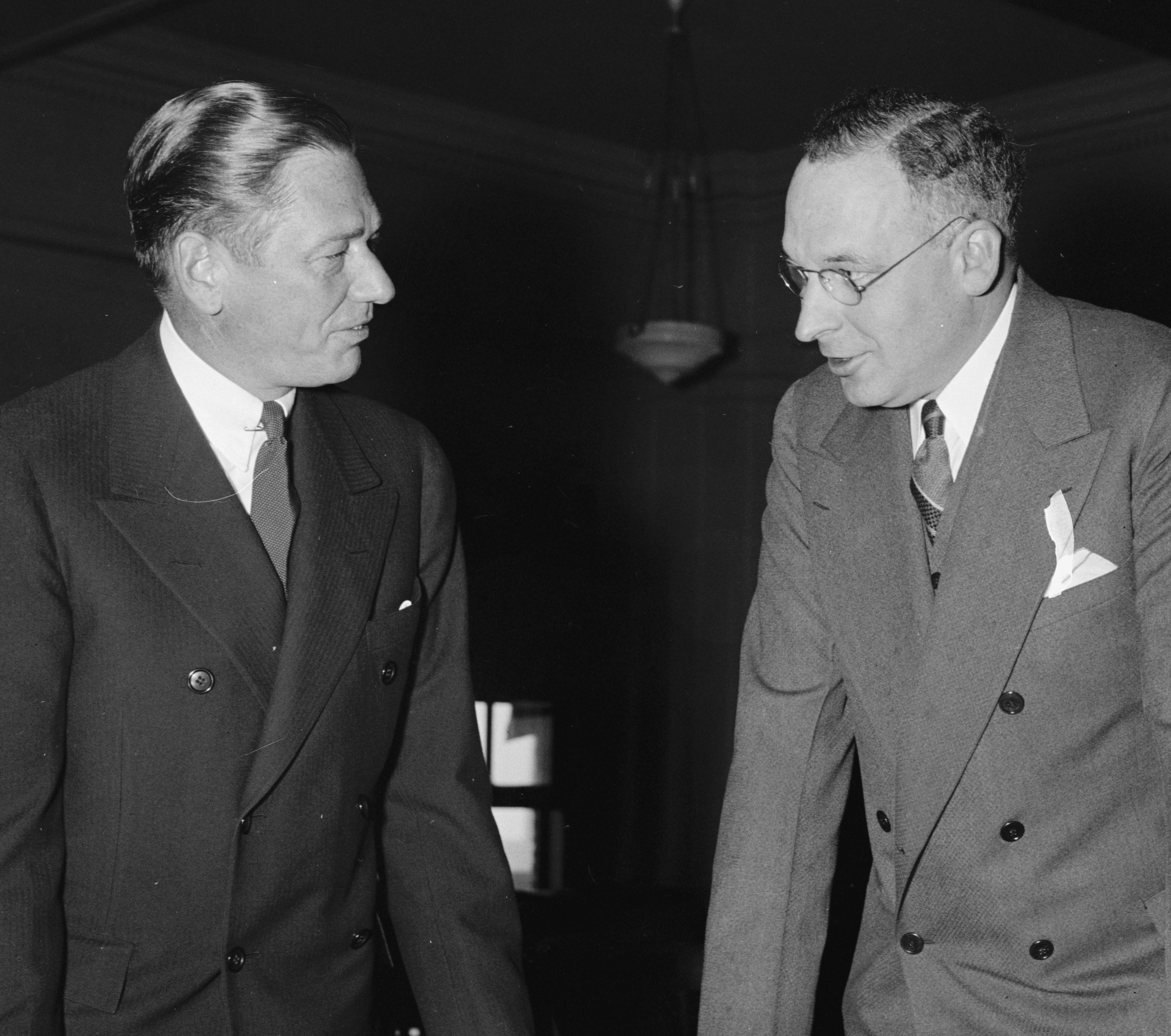
H.G. Wellington (left) and trial examiner Samuel O. Clark Jr. during the SEC investigation into the Whitney Co. collapse.

At the same time that Richard Whitney was achieving great success, his brother George had also prospered at Morgan bank and by 1930 had been anointed as the likely successor to bank president, Thomas W. Lamont. While Richard Whitney was assumed to be a brilliant financier, he in fact had personally been involved with speculative investments in a variety of businesses and had sustained considerable losses. To stay afloat, he began borrowing heavily from his brother George as well as other wealthy friends, and after obtaining loans from as many people as he could, turned to embezzlement to cover his mounting business losses and maintain his extravagant lifestyle. He stole funds from the New York Stock Exchange Gratuity Fund, the New York Yacht Club (where he served as the Treasurer), and $800,000 worth of bonds from his father-in-law's estate.

Having retired as president of the New York Stock Exchange in 1935, Whitney remained on its board of governors. In early March 1938, the comptroller of the exchange reported to his superiors that he had established absolute proof that Richard Whitney was an embezzler and his company was insolvent. Within days, events snowballed, and Whitney and his company would both declare bankruptcy. An astonished public learned of his misdeeds on March 10 when he was officially charged with embezzlement by New York County District Attorney Thomas E. Dewey. Following his indictment by a grand jury, Whitney was arrested and eventually pleaded guilty. He was sentenced to a term of five to ten years in Sing Sing prison. On April 12, 1938, six thousand people turned up at Grand Central Terminal to watch as a scion of the Wall Street Establishment was escorted in handcuffs by armed guards onto a train that delivered him to prison.

According to author William Manchester, "at Sing Sing other convicts took off their caps when he approached them, and in prison yard baseball games they always let him get a hit."

A model prisoner, Richard Whitney was released on parole in August 1941 after serving three years and four months in Sing Sing. He became the manager of a dairy farm, supervising three farmhands and twenty-five cows. In 1946, he went back into business when he became president of a textile company that made yarns from the ramie plant, which grew in Florida.

== Personal life ==
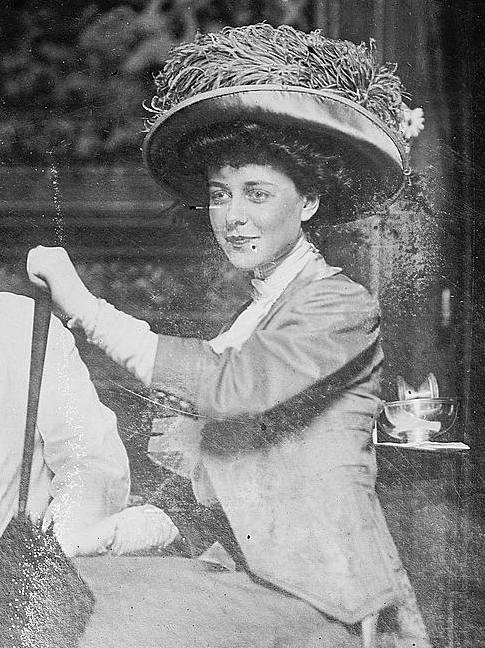
Gertrude Sands Whitney

In 1916, Whitney was married to Gertrude Alison (née Sheldon) Sands (1888–1969). Gertrude, a daughter of Mary Seney Sheldon and George R. Sheldon of Brooklyn, New York, was the widow of S.S. Sands & Co. banker Samuel Steven Sands III (a son of Anne Harriman Vanderbilt and step-son of William Kissam Vanderbilt), her first husband. His father-in-law had served as president of the powerful Union League Club, and Whitney became a member of a number of the city's elite social clubs and was appointed treasurer of the New York Yacht Club. In addition to her son from her first marriage, Samuel Stevens Sands IV (1911–1976), Richard and Gertrude were the parents of two daughters together:

- Nancy Whitney (1917–2012), who married Henry Averell Gerry (1914–2000), a son of Robert Livingston Gerry Sr. and brother of Elbridge T. Gerry Sr. and Robert L. Gerry Jr.
- Alice Whitney (1919–2015), who married Screven Lorillard (1909–1979), a son of Ernest E. Lorillard and Elizabeth King (née Screven) Lorillard. Lorillard was previously married to Natica Blair, a granddaughter of DeWitt Clinton Blair.

Their New York City town home, New Jersey farm, and property were auctioned off. After his fall from grace, his wife and family stood by him, and friend May Kinnicutt and her husband, G. Hermann Kinnicutt, a partner in a stock brokerage firm, provided Mrs. Whitney with a farmhouse to live in at Far Hills, New Jersey. George Whitney eventually made restitution for all the money his brother owed.

Banned from dealing in securities for life, he was living a quiet life in Far Hills, New Jersey, at the time of his death on December 5, 1974.

== In popular culture ==
- Louis Auchincloss wrote a novel based on his life entitled The Embezzler.
- Portrayed by Robert Vaughn in The Day the Bubble Burst (1982) television film about the crash of 1929.
