= Tallulah Falls School =

Historic school in Georgia, US

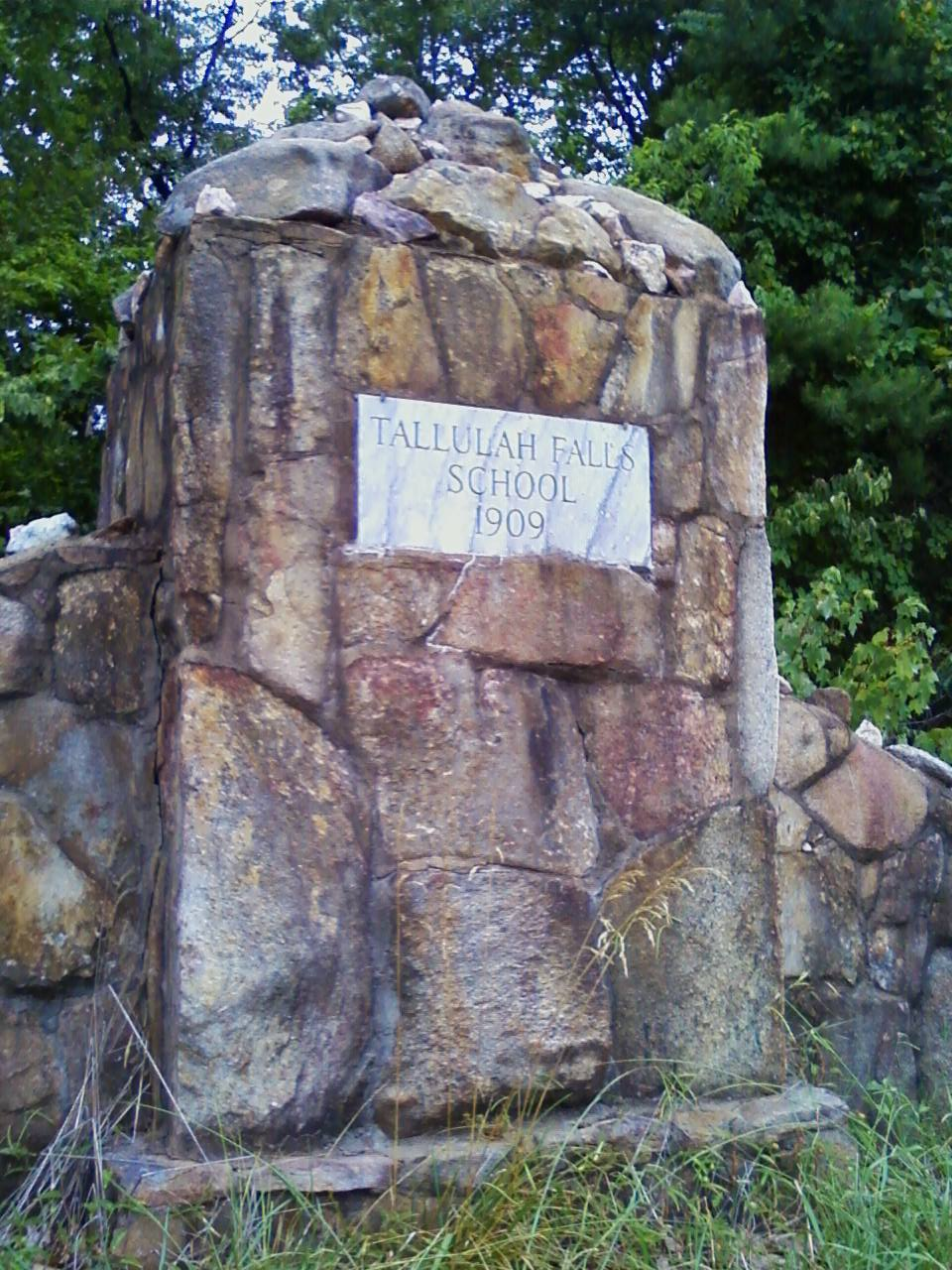
- Tallulah Falls, Georgia; United States

Information
- Type: Private
- Motto: "The Light in the Mountains"
- Established: 1909
- President: Larry A. Peevy
- Principal: David Chester, middle school
- Principal: Jeremy Stille, upper school
- Faculty: 22.4 (on FTE basis)
- Grades: 5 to 12
- Enrollment: 544 (2023–24)
- Student to teacher ratio: 5.6:1
- Colors: Green and gold
- Sports: Tennis, track and field, soccer, cross country, basketball, softball, cheerleading, swimming, baseball, volleyball, swim, tennis, E-sports
- Mascot: Indian
- Nickname: Tribe
- Website: https://www.tallulahfalls.org/

- Tallulah Falls School
- U.S. National Register of Historic Places
- U.S. Historic district
- Location within Georgia Location within the United States
- Location: Jct. of US 441 and Tallulah School Rd. Tallulah Falls, Georgia
- Coordinates: 34°43′54″N 83°23′36″W
- Built: 1909
- Architect: Fred Orr
- Architectural style: Bungalow/Craftsman
- NRHP reference No.: 91002026
- Added to NRHP: January 30, 1992

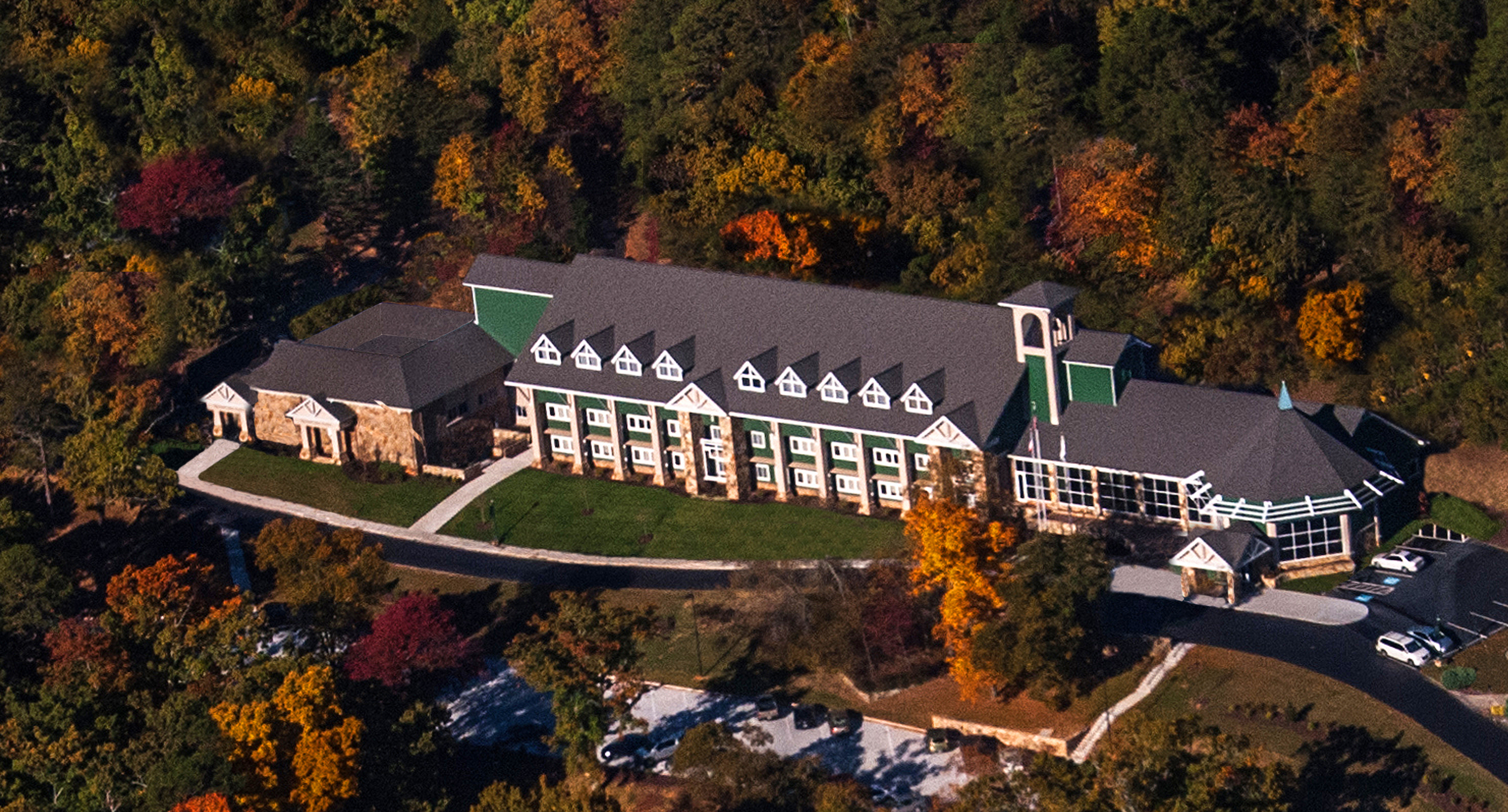
An aerial view of the school captured in fall 2014. This image showcases the recently expanded and renovated upper school academic building. Photo/Marie Nease-Wing Dreamer Photography

Tallulah Falls School is a private boarding and day school located in the town of Tallulah Falls, Georgia, United States, within Habersham and Rabun Counties. The school is located on a wooded campus in northeast Georgia on the southern slopes of Cherokee Mountain at the foothills of the Appalachian chain. The school was founded in 1909 by Mary Ann Lipscomb of Athens.

The school is listed on the National Register of Historic Places.

In the fall of 2014, TFS opened its expanded and renovated Upper School academic building. On the same day as the dedication, school officials broke ground on a new gymnasium project on the middle school campus. The $4.5 million structure was slated for completion in the fall of 2016.

In the Summer of 2017, construction began on a natatorium complex featuring a competition-sized pool with bleacher seating for 240 people.
