= McDaniel-Tichenor House =

Historic house in Georgia, United States

- U.S. National Register of Historic Places
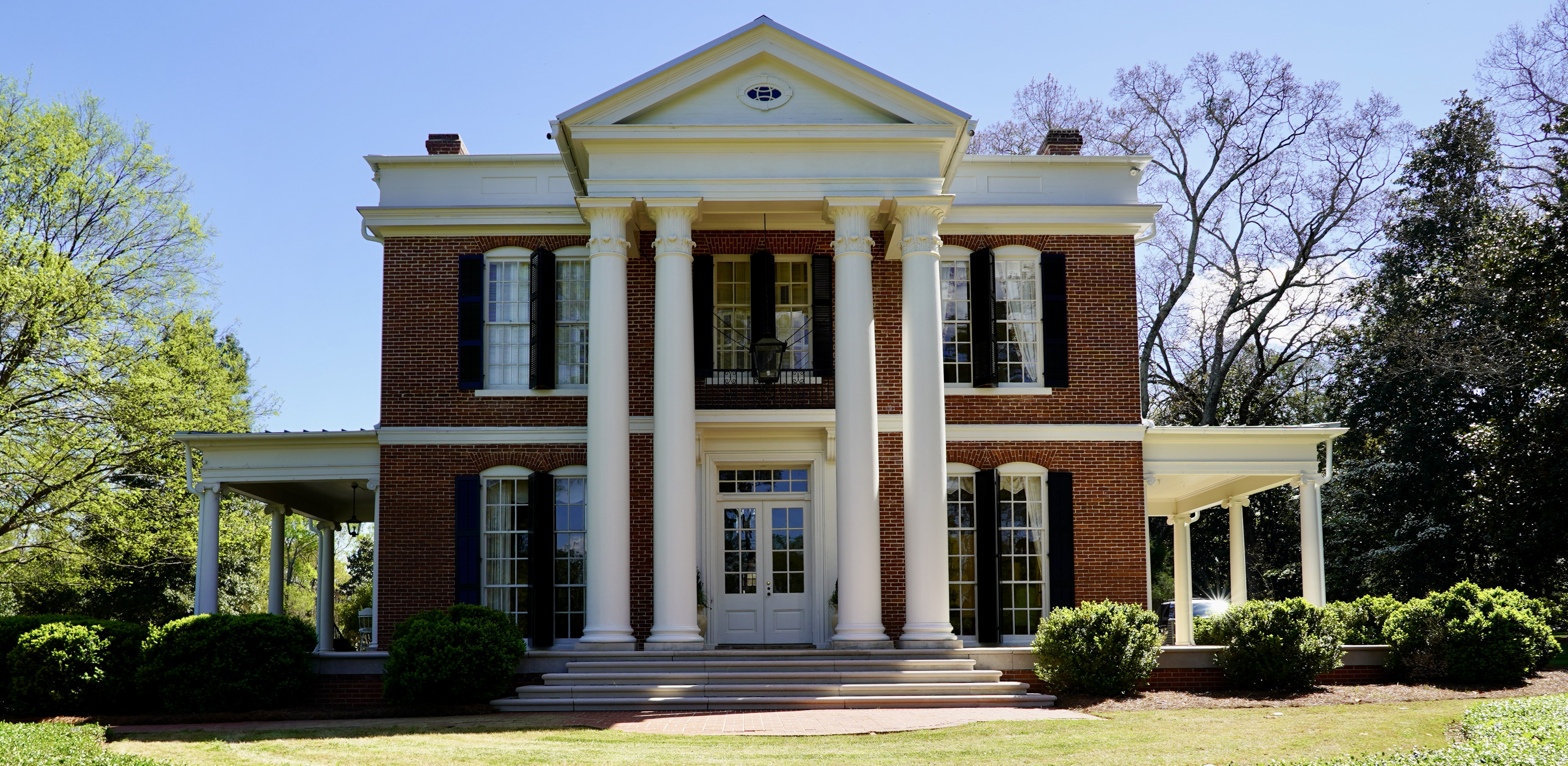
- Exterior view of the McDaniel-Tichenor House, former home of prominent Georgia citizen Henry Dickerson McDaniel

- Location within Georgia Location within the United States
- Location: 319 Mcdaniel Street, Monroe, Georgia
- Coordinates: 33.79077741°N 83.71591955°W
- Area: 12 acres (4.9 ha)
- Built: 1887; 1930
- Architect: William Winstead Thomas, Francis Boddie Warfield
- Architectural style: Classical Revival
- NRHP reference No.: 80001255
- Added to NRHP: February 8, 1980

The McDaniel-Tichenor House, located in Monroe, Georgia, United States was built in 1887 for retiring Governor Henry McDaniel. Originally designed by Athens, Georgia architect William Winstead Thomas (1848-1904) in the then-popular Victorian Italianate Villa style, the house was extensively remodeled in the 1930s by Nashville architect, and son-in-law of Edgar and Gipsy Tichenor, Francis Boddie Warfield. Remade in the Neoclassical style popular with prominent southerners at the time, the Tichenors also added modern indoor plumbing, electricity and heating systems. Though the interior was reconfigured as well, much of the original woodwork, doors and inlaid marbleized mantels are original.

The eclectically furnished interior features pieces dating from the late 18th century up until the mid-20th. Many original pieces, such as the Governor's carved mahogany bed, were rescued from storage in the servants house and restored by Emily Tichenor. The McDaniel-Tichenor House remained occupied by the same family until just under a decade ago.

The 1930 renovation, which changed the house from its original 1887 Italianate style to Neo-Classical style, was designed by Francis Boddie Warfield (1891-1975), who was a well-known Nashville architect and was the grandson-in-law of Governor McDaniel and was son-in-law of the incoming Tichenors.

The McDaniel-Tichenor House was added to the National Register of Historic Places in 1980. The home presently serves as a special events and educational facility.
