= George I. Seney =

American philanthropist and banker

George Ingraham Seney (May 12, 1826 – April 7, 1893) was a New York City banker, art collector, and benefactor. He was the father of symphonic music executive Mary Seney Sheldon.

He is best remembered for amassing a substantial collection of pre-Impressionist 19th-century European and American paintings, some of which he gave to the Metropolitan Museum of Art. The donation included works by George Inness and Francis Davis Millet.

== Early life ==
Seney was born in 1826 in Newtown (now called Elmhurst, Queens) in what was then Queens County, Long Island. He was the son of Jane Augusta (née Ingraham) Seney (1800–1871) and Robert Seney (1797–1854), a graduate of Columbia College who became a Methodist minister and preached in Astoria (in present-day Queens).

He was a descendant of Joshua Seney, who represented Maryland in the Continental Congress, and Frances "Fanny" (née Nicholson) Seney (a daughter of James W. Nicholson, who was one of the first commodores in the United States Navy). His uncle, Joshua Seney Jr. was the father of Judge Henry William Seney.

After studying at Wesleyan University, he completed his baccalaureate education at New York University, graduating in 1846. He lived for much of his life in Brooklyn.

== Career ==
As president of the Metropolitan Bank in New York City, Seney was situated to become a financier of newly chartered railroads. The bank failed, however, in 1884. This permanently shadowed the remainder of Seney's life and career. He was forced to sell most of his art collection in auctions held in 1885, and in 1891.

=== Railroads ===
Charters organized or financed by Seney, and his Seney Syndicate, included the East Tennessee, Virginia and Georgia Railway and the Nickel Plate Road. Seney's financial career reached its height in October 1882 when the Seney Syndicate sold the Nickel Plate to New York Central interests for $7.2 million in gold.

Seney's bank was a financial backer of the Detroit, Mackinac and Marquette Railroad, a developer of real estate in the Upper Peninsula of the U.S. state of Michigan, and the railroad named one of its depots after the New Yorker. The depot became the logging town and resort village of Seney, Michigan, and the regional name gave birth to the Seney National Wildlife Refuge.

=== Bernardsville, New Jersey ===
In 1871, Seney acquired the Hampton House boarding house in Bernardsville, New Jersey, from Francis Oliver, feeling the home and area could be developed and attract even more visitors to the area. He renamed it Highland House and began to expand the house the property that ultimately became a luxurious destination hotel. The Highland House would later become the prestigious Somerset Inn. Over time, the inn grounds would cover over 850 acres and could accommodate up to 500 guests. The main part of the inn was five stories tall and had grand views. It was noted also that there were "no marshy swamps, so there weren't mosquitos." It was warmed by steam, equipped with elevators, and was lighted by gas. On May 6, 1908, just a few weeks before the season opening, a fire broke out and the inn burned down, leaving the 20 chimneys and little else. After the fire, the land was eventually subdivided and sold off.

Seney was also instrumental in the creation of the Somerset Hills County Club, the relocated Essex Hunt Club, and the Somerset Hills Bridal Path Association. George was a founding member of St. Bernard's Church. In 1880, Seney gave a donation of land and a frame church to the Methodist Church, a gift valued at $10,000, located a short distance east of the intersection of Church and Wesley streets. The church was dedicated on June 27, 1880.

== Personal life ==
In 1849, Seney married Phoebe Augusta Moser (1833–1904), a daughter of Samuel H. Moser and Lucinda (née Vail) Moser. Together, they lived at 4 Montague Terrace in Brooklyn and were the parents of ten children, including:

- Robert Seney (1850–1923), a banker.
- Jane Augusta Seney (1852–1926), who married Albert Turner Plummer (1848–1913).
- George Ingraham Seney Jr. (1860–1916), who married Grace Tappen, daughter of Frederick D. Tappen, in 1883.
- Mary Robinson Seney (1863–1913), who married George Rumsey Sheldon, a Harvard graduate and banker.
- Kate Seney (1868–1943), who married John Woodruff Simpson, an attorney and art collector.

Seney died of heart disease at the Grand Hotel on Broadway and 31st Street in New York City on April 7, 1893.

=== Descendants ===
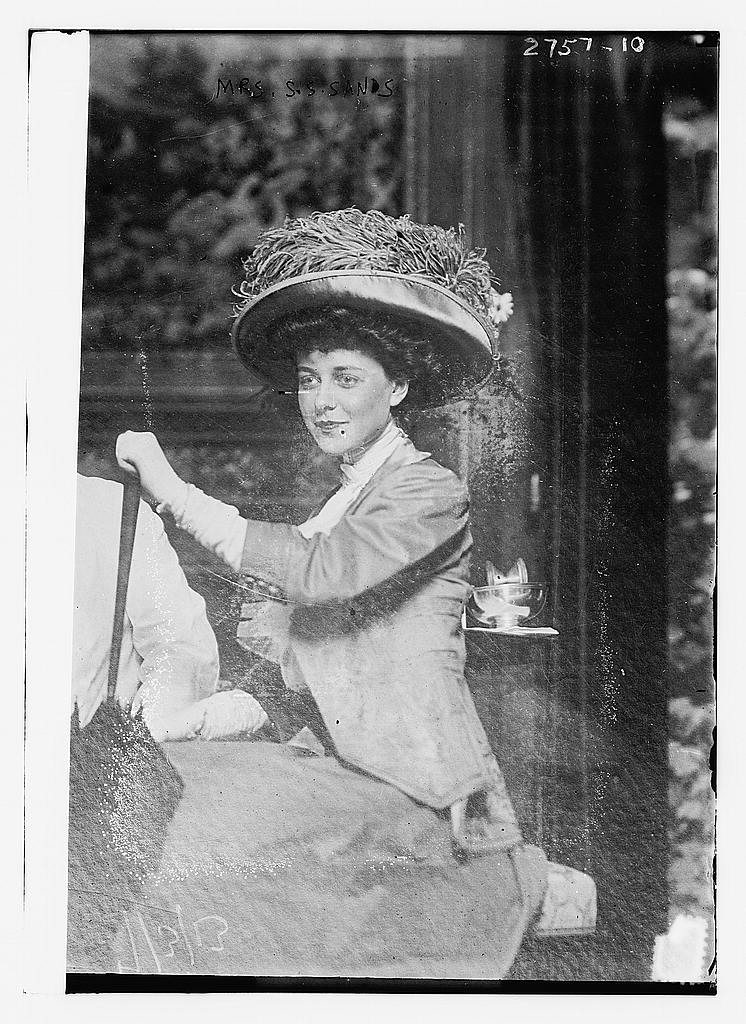
His granddaughter, Gertrude Sands Whitney

Through his daughter Jane, he was a grandfather of Jane Seney Plummer, who married Grant Barney Schley Jr., a son of Grant B. Schley, in 1902. They divorced in 1922,

Through his daughter Mary, he was a grandfather of Gertrude Alison Sheldon (1888–1969), who married Samuel Stevens Sands of S.S. Sands & Co. in 1910. After his death in 1913, she married financier Richard Whitney in 1916.

== Legacy ==
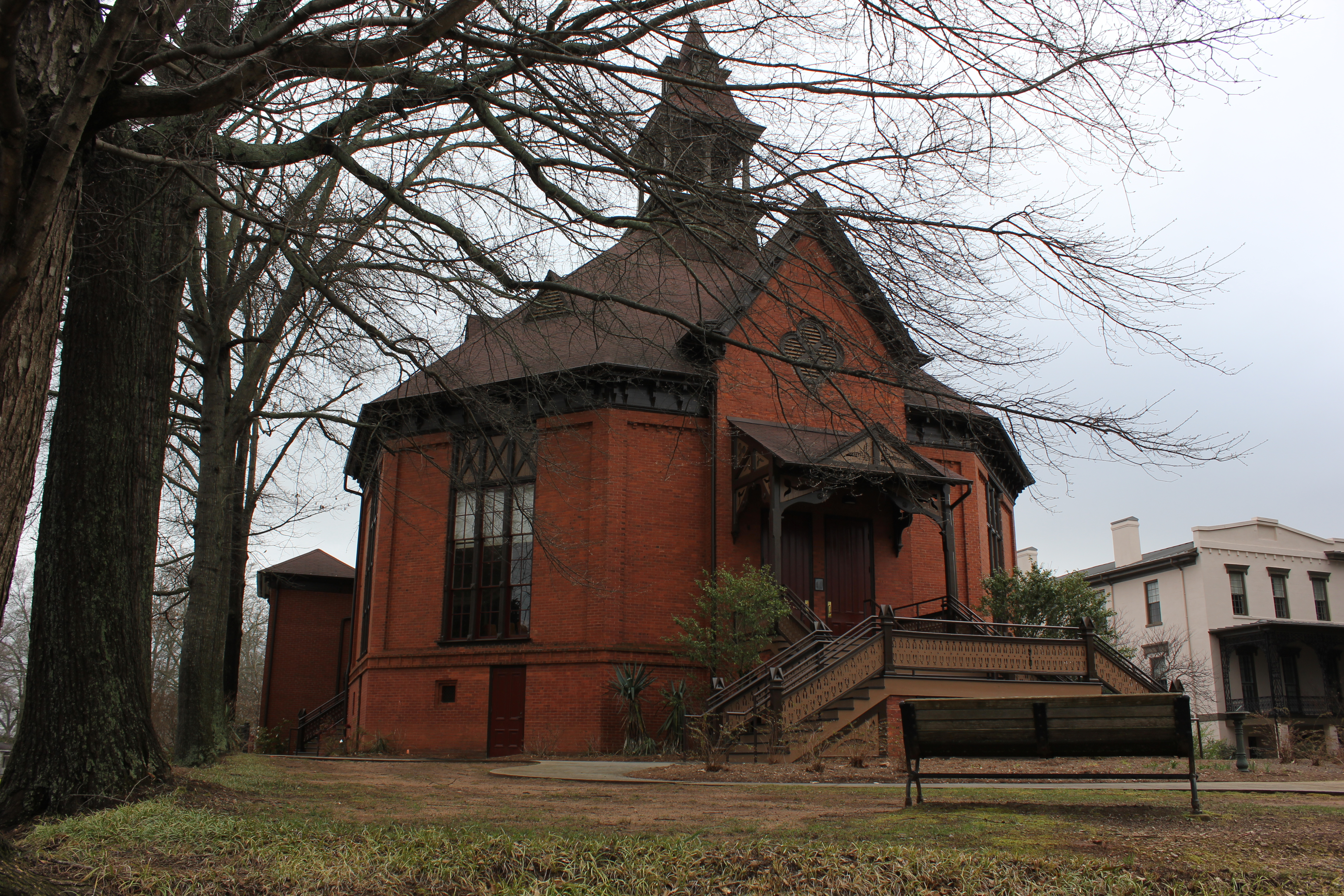
The Seney–Stovall Chapel in Athens, Georgia, which Seney funded the construction of

When Dakota Territory representative (and later South Dakota senator) Richard F. Pettigrew traveled east in the late 1870s to find investors for a flour milling venture in Sioux Falls, South Dakota, Seney was interested and helped bankroll the Queen Bee mill, which ruins still stand above the city's namesake falls. An island a short distance upstream was a popular gathering spot in the city's earlier days, and it was soon renamed Seney Island (however, the island later disappeared after the river's channel was altered to increase the flow to a hydroelectric plant built just north of the mill).

In 1881 Seney endowed the construction of what is now Seney Hall at Oxford College of Emory University. In the same year he was a key founder and backer of what became the NewYork-Presbyterian Brooklyn Methodist Hospital in Park Slope. He also provided $10,000 for the construction of today's Seney–Stovall Chapel in Athens, Georgia, now part of the University of Georgia.
