= Hotel Metropole, Sydney =

Coordinates: 33.865°S 151.211°E

Hotel Metropole
- Badge of the hotel, featuring the badge of the NSW State Arms.

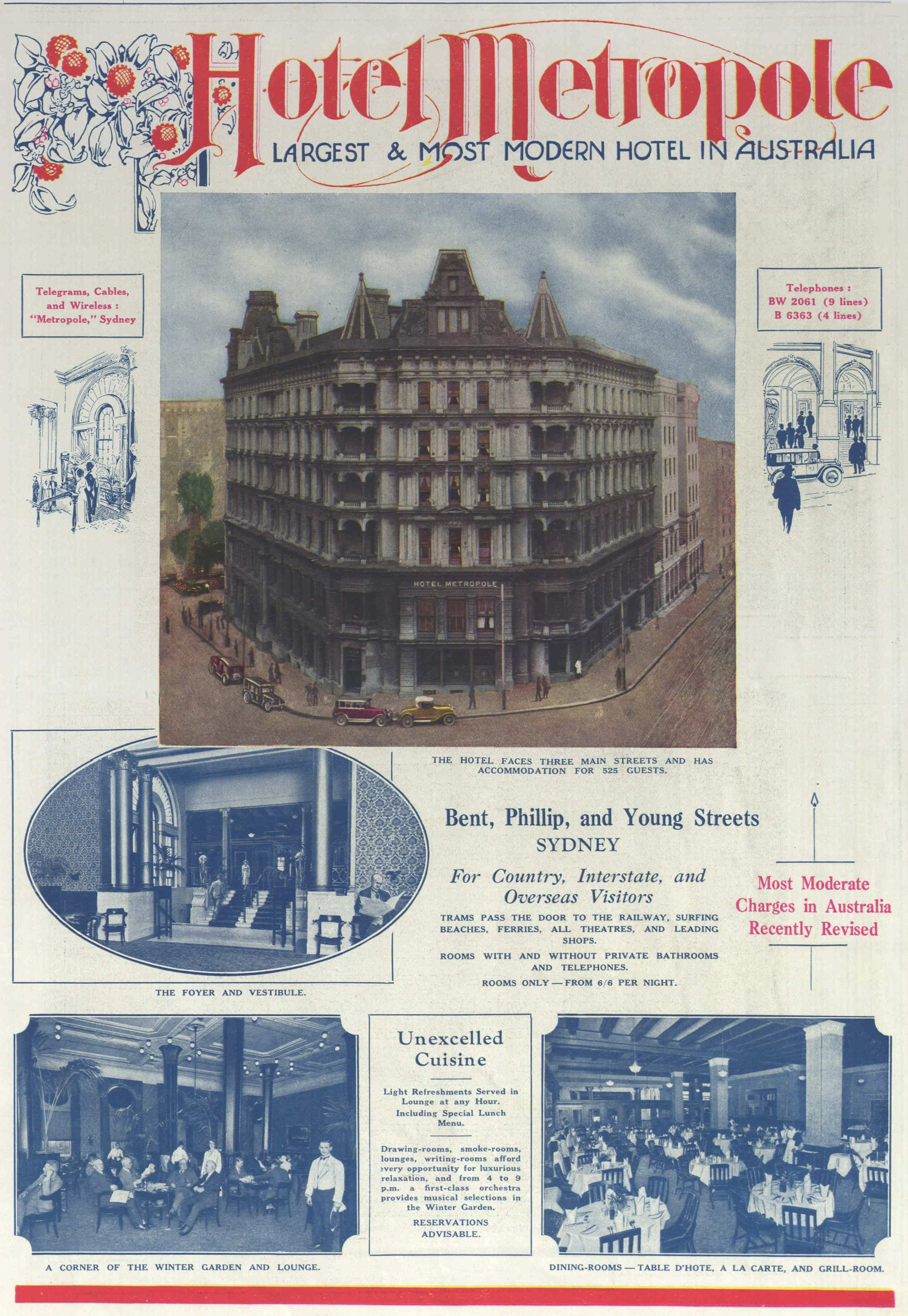
- 1932 Hotel Metropole advertisement, published in The Sydney Mail.
- Interactive map of the Hotel Metropole area

General information
- Type: Hotel
- Architectural style: Victorian Second Empire
- Location: Bent, Phillip, and Young Streets, Sydney, Australia
- Named for: Metropole Hotel London (Est. 1885)
- Construction started: 1888
- Completed: 1889
- Opening: 14 January 1890
- Demolished: 1970
- Client: Australian Coffee Palace Company

Height
- Roof: 32.91 m (108.0 ft)

Technical details
- Floor count: 6

Design and construction
- Architecture firm: Sheerin & Hennessy; Twentyman & Askew
- Main contractor: W. H. Jennings

Renovating team
- Architects: Henry Budden (H. E. Budden & Mackey)
- Engineer: F. P. Woolacott (1935)
- Main contractor: Robert Wall & Sons Ltd.

The Hotel Metropole was a hotel located on a block bounded by Bent, Phillip, and Young Streets in the central business district of Sydney. From its opening in January 1890, it was considered as one of Sydney's premier hotels, and catered towards rural visitors to the city. Originally designed by architects Sheerin & Hennessy and Twentyman & Askew, the hotel was remodelled and extended in 1929 by Henry Budden. With the land value outstripping the profits gained by the hotel by the late 20th century, the hotel was closed in May 1970 and demolished later the same year to make way for a modernist office development, CAGA House (later demolished in 1992 for Governor Macquarie Tower).

== History ==
=== Early development and opening ===
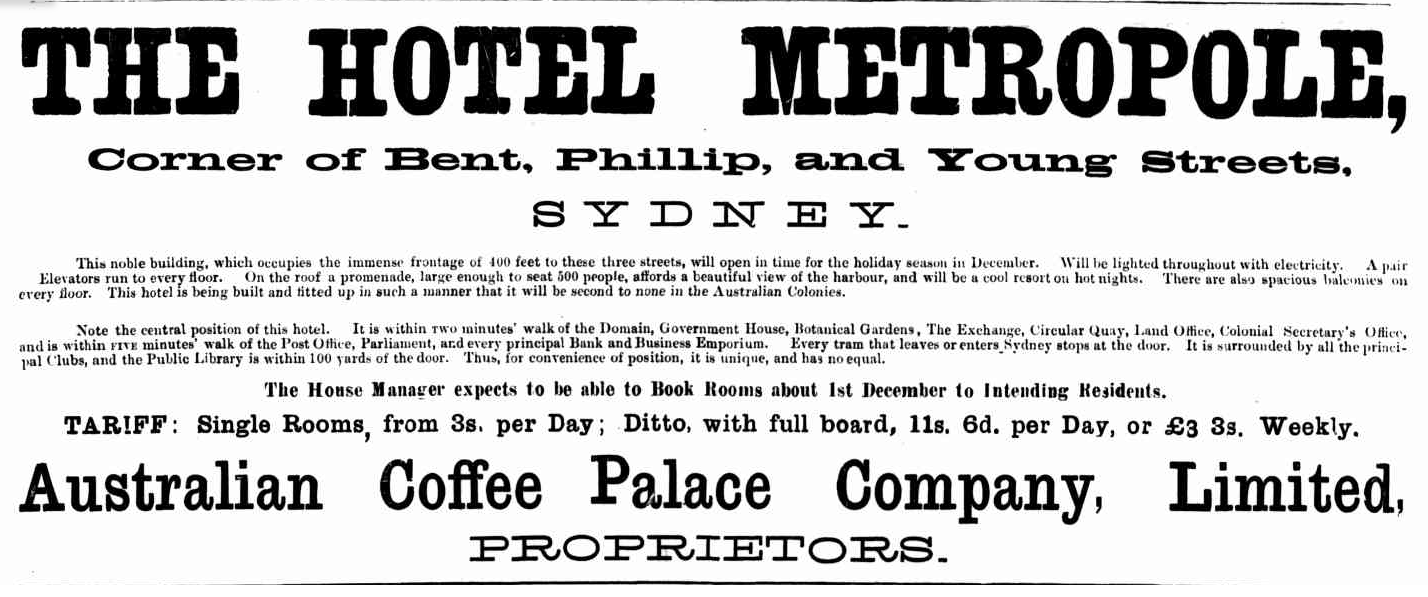
Advertisement promoting the Hotel Metropole, published in The Sydney Mail (21 September 1889).

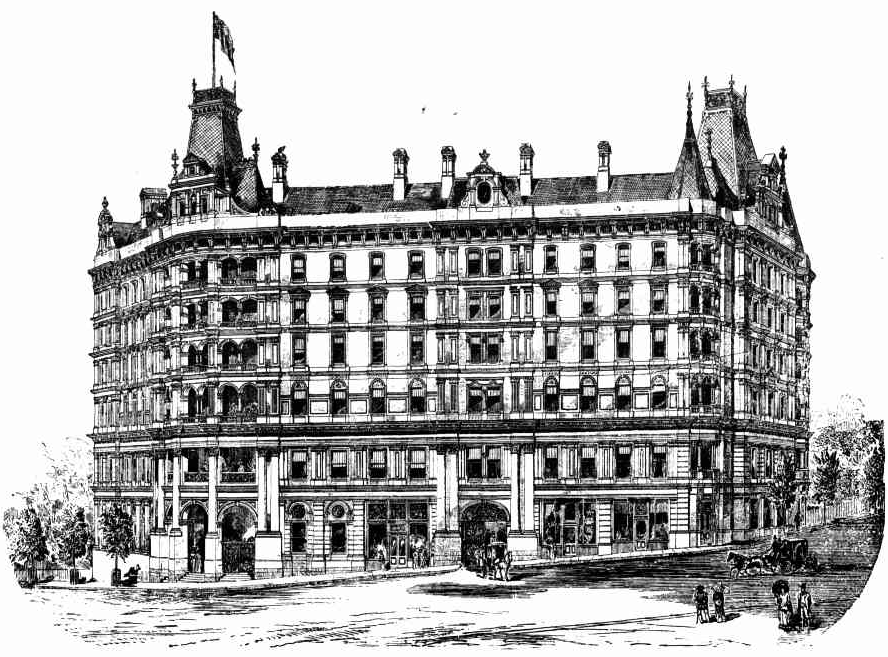
Sketch of the Hotel Metropole (1890) from Bent Street.

In the mid-1880s, it was reported that there was a lack of high quality hotel accommodation within the city of Sydney. In an August 1886 article reporting on the development of the Federal Coffee Palace hotel in Melbourne, the Sydney Mail commented that "In the matter of hotel accommodation, Sydney compares very unfavourably with Melbourne." In 1885, the Bakewell Brothers firm had purchased for £6,500 a vacant site bounded by Bent, Phillip, and Young Streets, on the former Government House estate, in the centre of Sydney for the purpose of erecting a "Palace Hotel", to fulfil this need.

On this announcement, the Illustrated Sydney News commented: "Visitors to Sydney from other countries have, from time to time, remarked upon the lack of really good hotel accommodation, and, indeed, have asserted that there is really no first-class establishment in the city, in the sense in which the words are accepted in Europe and America. Whatever truth there may be in the statement, it is not likely that it will remain as a reproach to the enterprise of the city for any length of time. The first steps towards the establishment of a large hotel of the first-class, and on a scale of great magnificence, have already been taken and, in all probability, the efforts of the promoters will, ere long, bear good fruit." However, although a public design competition was held in November 1885 and the designs by Moorhouse & Loweish and John Kirkpatrick receiving first and second prizes, respectively, no further action was taken on this development.

By December 1887, the Melbourne-based Coffee Taverns Company Limited (renamed the "Australian Coffee Palace Company Limited" in August 1888), the operators since 1881 of the Melbourne Coffee Palace on Bourke Street, responded to interest in opening of a branch of their temperance-based Coffee palace in Sydney, and purchased the freehold title of the site for developing a "Coffee Palace Hotel". By mid-1888, designs by the Sydney-based architectural firm of Sheerin & Hennessy and the Melbourne-based Twentyman & Askew were accepted by the company for a 300-room hotel. At the February 1889 meeting of the company it was reported that the land purchase had cost £10,000, and the hotel construction was contracted for £75,000.

By August 1889, the company had decided to rename the under-construction hotel the "Hotel Metropole" because "visitors arriving in the colonies by the mail boats were prejudiced by the name of 'Coffee Palace'". When an objection was raised that the name change implied that "it would give a stranger the idea that intoxicating liquors were sold within it", the board chairman, William McLean, responded: "for many years temperance hotels had a very bad name, and for anyone to say he was going into a temperance hotel was about equal to saying he was going into a third class boarding house. The desire of the directors was to let the public know that that state of things did not now exist, and that they could now get proper accommodation in such institutions. They considered that as the Hotel Metropole was the best hotel in London, they could not do better than copy the name for their Sydney establishment. There was nothing in the name of a hotel to indicate that intoxicating drink was sold in it, and an example of this could be seen in the case of the Grand Hotel."

With the construction completed by Sydney builder W. H. Jennings in late 1889, the Hotel Metropole was officially opened on 14 January 1890 by the Mayor of Sydney, Sydney Burdekin, featuring full electric lighting installed by Drake & Gorham of London. On its opening, The Sydney Morning Herald proclaimed: "No more magnificent structure in design and appointment of its type can be found in the colonies, and certainly not in Sydney, than the Hotel Metropole." Leon Erckmann, of the Grand Hotel in Melbourne, was appointed as the first hotel manager.

=== Development and growth ===
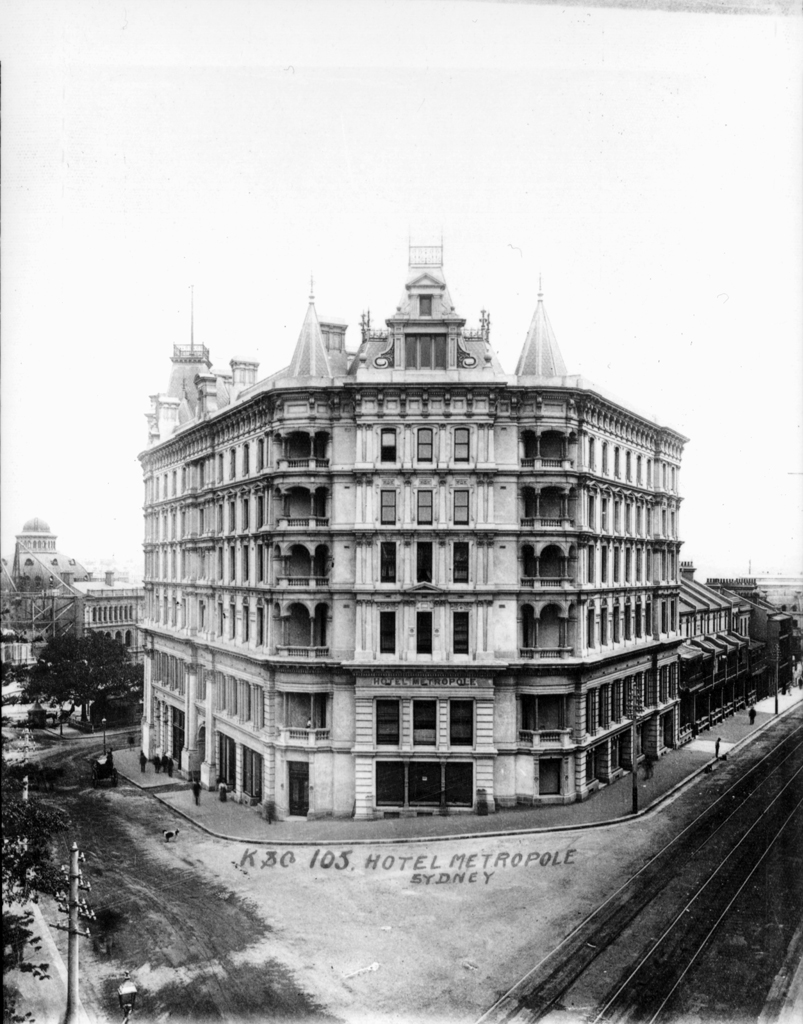
Hotel Metropole, photographed on the corner of Phillip and Bent streets (1890).

A year later in January 1891, the Australian Coffee Palace Company established the "Hotel Metropole Company Limited", as an independent company to own and manage the hotel, with William Paul Small serving as the first managing director until his retirement in 1925. From its opening in 1891 until 1912, the Hotel Metropole company owned a substantial portion of the shares of The Australia Hotel on Castlereagh Street, with W. P. Small also serving as managing director of The Australia Hotel. Following the transfer of ownership into an independent company, in June 1891 the hotel was granted a liquor license under the Licensing Act, 1882, ending its status as a 'dry hotel'. A billiards license under the Billiard and Bagatelle Licensing Act, 1882 was also acquired at the same time.

Following its opening, the hotel became established as one of the most prominent and popular hotels in the city. The list of guests was frequently published in the press and included many notable names of the colony and abroad (For example, Bruce Smith, Sir Walter Buller, and Sir Patrick Jennings). Despite the challenges present by the First World War, it was reported by 1918 that the hotel remained highly profitable. In 1927, the hotel was granted permission to serve liquor with meals after 6 pm. By 1929, it was reported that by virtue of its size, position and good management, that it "is naturally able to win good figures in the face of almost adverse circumstances, and, throughout the years, has proved to be one of Sydney's most successful residential hotels."

With capacity limits proving to be an inhibitor of future growth, the company decided to invest some of the profits into further expansion and renovation, commissioning over £155,000 worth of works to become what they called the "largest hotel in Australia". Having purchased the sites adjoining the hotel on Phillip Street, the scheme included a substantial extension that would involve the demolition of five four-storey Victorian terrace buildings at 49–57 Phillip Street. In 1927, prominent Sydney architect Henry Budden and master builder Robert Wall & Sons were commissioned by the company to undertake the works, with Budden simplifying the Second Empire style of the original hotel and designing the extension in a Stripped Classical style, and increasing capacity to over 530 guests. With the works completed in 1929, other improvements included private bathrooms for the majority of rooms and two new dining rooms. At the same time as these works were completed, several buildings immediately to the north of the hotel at 56–58 Young Street were demolished to make way for the construction of "Bradford House" (O'Brien House from 1930), a 9-storey Georgian Revival style office building designed by Spencer & Spencer architects and built by H. W. Thompson Ltd.

Further simplification of the ornamentation on the 1890 building façade and the restoration of render was undertaken in 1934–1935 by Robert Wall & Sons under the supervision of Budden. In June 1935, Budden also designed the addition of an Art Deco style awning over the entrance on the corner of Bent and Young Streets. Additional alterations occurred to the hotel in the post-war period, including mostly internal alterations to rooms, service areas, windows, and bathrooms. These were designed by architects Nicholas Mackey (1957; 1958), and Henderson & Sherlock (1964; 1965).

Like all hotels, the Hotel Metropole saw its fair share of deaths, which often generated a high degree of interest in the press, given its prominent clientele. The most prominent of these being within the space of several weeks in March 1954, when three people died by falling in separate incidents, including former politician Hugh Wragge.

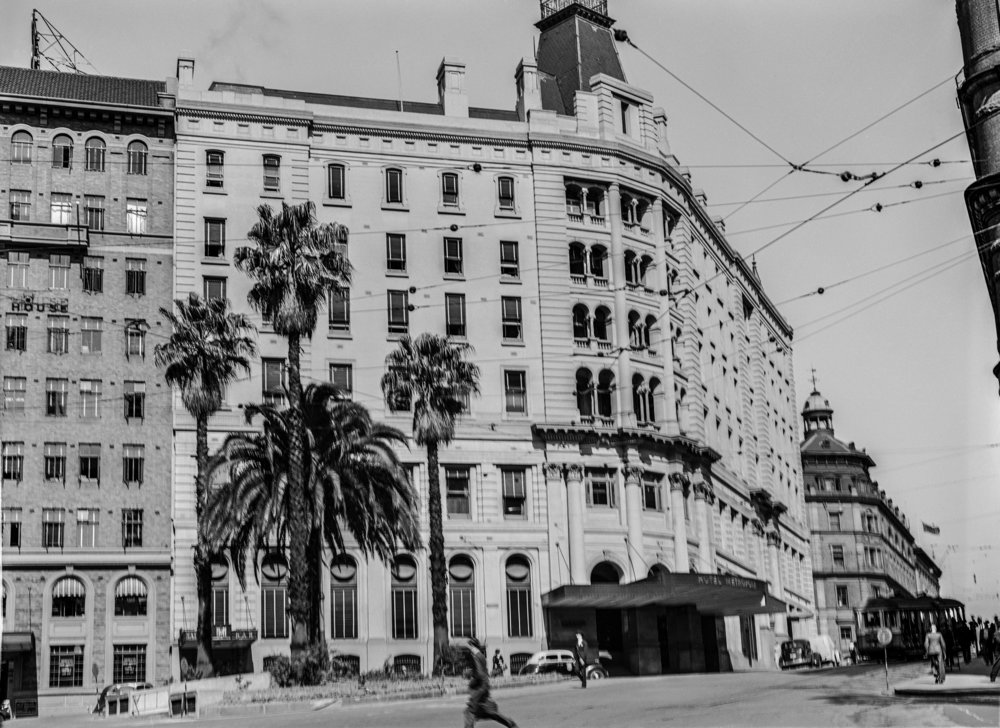
The Hotel Metropole viewed from Bent Street in 1949, showing the alterations undertaken to the façade and the new awning added by Henry Budden in 1928–1935.

=== Closure and demolition ===
With the 1957 repeal of the 1912 Height of Buildings Act that had previously prohibited all development in Sydney above 150-feet (45m), the development potential (and consequently land values) of sites within the Sydney CBD significantly increased into the 1960s. In 1968–1969, the Hotel Metropole Limited company rejected several takeover offers from developers, including LJ Hooker and Lendlease, largely due to its dispersed shareholder base and a resilient business: "Despite its old-fashioned style the Metropole has been able to withstand the competition from newly established hotels better than most. It has a large rural clientele." By mid-1969, Lendlease and a consortium of Parkes Developments Pty Ltd and Stocks and Holdings Ltd both made offers and had commenced buying up company shares, with the Parkes/Stocks and Holdings offer of $8.4 million eventually being successful when Leadlease withdrew its offer in May 1969.

In August 1969, the City of Sydney approved a development application for the demolition of the hotel and its replacement with a $6.3 million 33-storey (115m) modernist office tower development designed by Hugo Stossel (H. Stossel & Associates). On 2 April 1970, it was formally announced that the hotel would close on 5 May 1970 with demolition works commencing not long after. In July 1970, financial services company Commercial and General Acceptance Ltd (CAGA) announced that it would be the primary tenant of the new development, and consequently have the naming rights, with the new tower being named "CAGA Centre".

==== Metropole Tavern ====
Upon its closure, the hotel's liquor licence under the Liquor Act, 1912 was approved for transfer to a publican's license operating as a tavern (which had been permitted since the Liquor (Amendment) Act, 1969), in anticipation of a lower part of the new CAGA Centre development being set aside as a tavern with the name "Metropole Tavern". The Metropole Tavern opened for business on 5 December 1974, and became known as a live music venue, seeing performances from such artists as INXS, The Angels, and The Saints. The Metropole Tavern closed for business in late 1980, and the liquor license was transferred to a new bar opening in the McNamara Centre in Parramatta on 14 August 1981.

== See also ==
- The Australia Hotel
- Phillip Street Terraces
- Young Street Terraces
