= List of tallest voluntarily demolished buildings =

A landowner or governing authority may voluntarily demolish a building for various reasons, such as severe structural damage or land redevelopment. Involuntary (or unplanned) demolitions, such as a building collapsing during an earthquake or a terrorist attack, are excluded from this list. Similarly, structures that are not buildings, including roller coasters, drop towers, chimneys, telecommunication or observation towers, and guyed masts, are not included.

The demolition of especially tall buildings presents unique challenges, particularly when their location is within densely populated areas of their respective cities. They are most often deconstructed floor-by-floor down to the basement, as opposed to controlled implosion of the structure, which would most likely damage surrounding structures.

The following list includes the tallest demolished buildings, with a height of at least 100 metres (330 ft).

Rank	Building name	City	Country	Height		Floors	Year completed	Year demolished	Method	Reason
Rank	Building name	City	Country	(m)	(ft)	Floors	Year completed	Year demolished	Method	Reason
1	AXA Tower	Singapore	Singapore	235	771	52	1986	2023	Deconstruction	Demolished to make way for Skywaters Residences.
2	270 Park Avenue	New York	United States	215	707	52	1960	2021	Deconstruction	Demolished to make way for a taller building at 270 Park Avenue.
3	Torre de la Escollera	Cartagena	Colombia	206	676	58	2007 (halted)	2007	Deconstruction	Topped out, but never completed. Demolished due to severe structural damage caused by a storm on 13 May 2007. Prior to its destruction, it held the title of the tallest building in Colombia.
4	Singer Building	New York	United States	187	612	47	1908	1968	Deconstruction	Demolished to make way for One Liberty Plaza.
5	CPF Building	Singapore	Singapore	171	561	46	1976	2018	Deconstruction	Demolished to make way for a 29-story office tower (only 10 meters taller). Second-tallest building demolished in Asia.
6	Meena Plaza I	Abu Dhabi	United Arab Emirates	168.5	553	46	2014 (halted)	2020	Implosion	Topped out, but never completed. Tallest building ever to be demolished using explosives.
7	Fuji Xerox Towers	Singapore	Singapore	165	541	38	1987	2023	Deconstruction	Demolished to make way for Newport Residences.
8	World Trade Center	Tokyo	Japan	163	533	40	1970	2023	Deconstruction	Demolished as part of the Hamamatsucho Station West Entrance District redevelopment.
9	Morrison Hotel	Chicago	United States	160	526	45	1925	1965	Manual	Demolished to make way for Bank One Plaza.
10	Deutsche Bank Building	New York	United States	158	518	39	1974	2011	Deconstruction	Heavily damaged from the September 11 attacks.
11	UIC Building	Singapore	Singapore	152	499	40	1973	2013	Deconstruction	Demolished to make way for V on Shenton.
12=	One Meridian Plaza	Philadelphia	United States	150	492	38	1972	1999	Deconstruction	Heavily damaged from a fire on 23 February 1991.
12=	Tun Razak Tower	Kuala Lumpur	Malaysia	150	492	35	1983	2014	Deconstruction	Damaged from the 2014 fire that broke out on the 27th floor of the building.
14	City Investing Building	New York	United States	148	487	33	1908	1968	Manual	Demolished to make way for One Liberty Plaza.
15	Mizuho Bank Uchisaiwaichō Head Office Building	Tokyo	Japan	143	469	38	1981	2023	Deconstruction	Demolished as part of the Uchisaiwaicho 1-Chome District Redevelopment.
16	The Ritz-Carlton, Hong Kong	Hong Kong	Hong Kong	142	465	31	1993	2009	Manual	Demolished to make way for China Construction Bank Tower.
17	Grand Prince Hotel Akasaka	Tokyo	Japan	141	463	39	1982	2013	Deconstruction	Demolished to make way for Tokyo Garden Terrace.
18	Hennessy Centre	Hong Kong	Hong Kong	140	458	41	1983	2008	Manual	Demolished to make way for Hysan Place.
19	Funkhaus am Raderberggürtel	Cologne	Germany	138	453	34	1980	2019	Deconstruction	Partial vacancy since 2003.
20=	Ardmore Park Old Block 1	Singapore	Singapore	137	449	36	1978	1997	Manual	Demolished to build new structures on the site.
20=	Ardmore Park Old Block 2	Singapore	Singapore	137	449	36	1978	1997	Manual	Demolished to build new structures on the site.
20=	Ardmore Park Old Block 3	Singapore	Singapore	137	449	36	1978	1997	Manual	Demolished to build new structures on the site.
23	Shaw Tower	Singapore	Singapore	134	440	35	1975	2020	Deconstruction	Demolished for redevelopment of the tower's site.
24	J. L. Hudson Department Store and Addition	Detroit	United States	134	439	29	1911	1998	Implosion	Historic J.L. Hudson Department Store; replaced by Hudson's Detroit.
25	National City Company Building	New York	United States	131	432	32	1928	1982	Manual	Demolished to make way for 60 Wall Street.
26	Palace II	Rio de Janeiro	Brazil	130	426	22	1995	1998	Implosion	Partially collapsed on 22 February 1998 due to engineering error.
27=	Savoy-Plaza Hotel	New York	United States	128	420	33	1927	1965	Manual	Demolished to make way for the General Motors Building.
27=	State Office Block	Sydney	Australia	128	420	32	1965	1997	Manual	Demolished to make way for Aurora Place.
29	The Excelsior	Hong Kong	Hong Kong	126	414	37	1973	2019	Manual	Demolished to make way for a 135-metre (443 ft) tall office tower.
30=	Bank Ekspres Tower	Istanbul	Turkey	125	410	27	1999	2016	Manual	Demolished due to the financial crisis and debts.
30=	CAGA House	Sydney	Australia	125	410	30	1977	1992	Manual	Demolished to make way for Governor Phillip Tower.
32	Bayer-Hochhaus	Leverkusen	Germany	122	400	32	1963	2012	Manual	Various issues with structure.
33	Landmark Tower	Fort Worth	United States	120	393.6	30	1952	2006	Implosion	Abandoned since 1990, and later damaged in a tornado in 2000. The cost to renovate the building was deemed not viable.
34	Empire Landmark Hotel	Vancouver	Canada	120	393	42	1973	2019	Deconstruction	Demolished to make way for a pair of new high-rise residential towers.
35	Asahi Seimei Otemachi Building	Tokyo	Japan	119.6	392	29	1971	2023	Deconstruction	Demolished to make way for Torch Tower.
36	Electric Tower	Buffalo	United States	119	389	N/A	1901	1902	Manual	Demolished after the World's fair ended along with the rest of the fair grounds.
37=	First National Bank Building	Pittsburgh	United States	118	387	26	1912	1969	Manual	Demolished to make way for One PNC Plaza.
37=	Jinhua Building	Xi'an	China	118	387	21	1996	2015	Implosion	Demolished for redevelopment of the tower's property. It was not used for decades even though it was legally the property of Jinhua Pharmaceutical Factory.
39	Centre International Rogier	Brussels	Belgium	117	384	30	1960	2001	Manual	Demolished to make way for Rogier Tower.
40	AfE-Turm	Frankfurt	Germany	116	381	32	1972	2014	Implosion	Demolished for redevelopment of the tower's site. Tallest building in Europe to be demolished using explosives.
41	Ocean Tower (The Leaning Tower of South Padre Island)	South Padre Island	United States	115	379	30	2008 (halted)	2009	Implosion	Demolished after cracks were found in the building's supporting columns, and various other deficiencies were discovered during construction. Never opened.
42=	Trinity Court Building	New York	United States	114	374	26	1927	2015	Manual	Demolished to make way for 76 Trinity Place.
42=	Capital One Tower	Lake Charles	United States	114	374	22	1983	2024	Implosion	Severely damaged by Hurricane Laura and Hurricane Delta in 2020 and subsequently left vacant until its demolition in September 2024.
44=	Pearl Bank Apartments	Singapore	Singapore	113	372	38	1976	2019	Deconstruction	Demolished to make way for One Pearl Bank.
44=	Richfield Tower	Los Angeles	United States	113	372	13	1929	1969	Manual	Demolished to make way for City National Plaza.
46	Edifício São Vito	São Paulo	Brazil	112	367	27	1959	2011	Manual	Building fell into disrepair.
47	Landmark Hotel and Casino Las Vegas	Paradise	United States	111	364	31	1969	1995	Implosion	Demolished to make way for a parking lot for the Las Vegas Convention Center.
48	Wilson Mendes Caldeira Building	São Paulo	Brazil	110	361	32	1963	1975	Implosion	Imploded to make way for the Sé metro station and Praça da Sé.
49=	Furama Hong Kong Hotel	Hong Kong	Hong Kong	110	360	32	1973	2002	Manual	Demolished to make way for AIA Central.
49=	Chongqing passenger transport building / Chaotianmen Hotel	Chongqing	China	110	360	32	1996	2012	Implosion	Demolished to make way for Raffles City.
51	Yamato Seimei Building	Tokyo	Japan	109	359	26	1984	2023	Deconstruction	Demolished as part of the Uchisaiwaicho 1-Chome District Redevelopment.
52=	Stardust Resort & Casino Las Vegas	Winchester	United States	108	354	32	1990	2007	Implosion	Demolished to make way for Echelon Place and Resorts World Las Vegas.
52=	Lisbon Bank Building	Johannesburg	South Africa	108	354	26	1967	2019	Implosion	A fire in 2018 caused the structure to be deemed unstable.
52=	Yufeng Building	Nanchang	China	108	354	26	1990	2017	Implosion	Demolished due to poor management and urban planning.
55	Sheraton Lincoln Hotel	Houston	United States	107	352	28	1962	2011	Deconstruction	The hotel had sat vacant since 1986 at the time of its demolition.
56	Millennium Hotel Cincinnati	Cincinnati	United States	107	350	32	1977	2022	Manual	Demolished due to dilapidated state and closure.
57=	Windsor Tower	Madrid	Spain	106	348	32	1979	2005	Manual	Heavily damaged from a fire on 12 February 2005.
57=	Hotel Sofitel Tokyo	Tokyo	Japan	106	348	26	1994	2008	Deconstruction	
57=	Manhattan Life Insurance Building	New York	United States	106	348	18	1894	1963 or 1964	Manual	Demolished to make way for an annex to 1 Wall Street.
60=	Farmers Bank Building	Pittsburgh	United States	105	345	27	1902	1997	Implosion	Demolished due to a lack of tenants.
60=	Crowne Plaza Hotel	Kuala Lumpur	Malaysia	105	345	26	1973	2014	Deconstruction	Demolished to make way for the proposed Tradewinds Square.
62=	Capital Plaza Tower	Frankfort	United States	103	338	28	1972	2018	Implosion	Falling concrete and water leaks from the building were reported in its later years. It was demolished to make way for a new 5-story office building, park, and 1,100-space parking garage.
62=	Supertech Apex Tower	Noida	India	103	338	32	2009–2012 (halted)	2022	Implosion	Demolished due to violation of national building code, along with the slightly smaller Ceyane Tower.
64	Enterprise House	Melbourne	Australia	102	336	24	1973	2020	Deconstruction	Demolished to redevelop the tower's site.
65	New York Tribune Building	New York	United States	102	335	19	1875	1966	Manual	Demolished to make way for 1 Pace Plaza.
66	Friedrich-Engelhorn-Hochhaus	Ludwigshafen	Germany	101	333	28	1957	2014	Manual	Demolished for the new BASF headquarters building.
67	Martin Tower	Bethlehem	United States	101	332	21	1972	2019	Implosion	Demolished for mixed-use rezoning of the tower's property.
68	Sparkasse Hagen Tower	Hagen	Germany	101	331	21	1975	2004	Implosion	Demolished due to damage from water leakage problems.
69	Tower Building	Baltimore	United States	101	330	16	1912	1986	Manual	Demolished after it was found structurally unsafe.
70=	Drapers' Gardens	London	United Kingdom	100	328	30	1967	2007	Deconstruction	Demolished for redevelopment of the tower's site.
70=	Southwark Towers	London	United Kingdom	100	328	25	1976	2008	Deconstruction	Demolished to make way for The Shard.
