= John & Mary Elizabeth Booth Endicott House =

- U.S. National Register of Historic Places
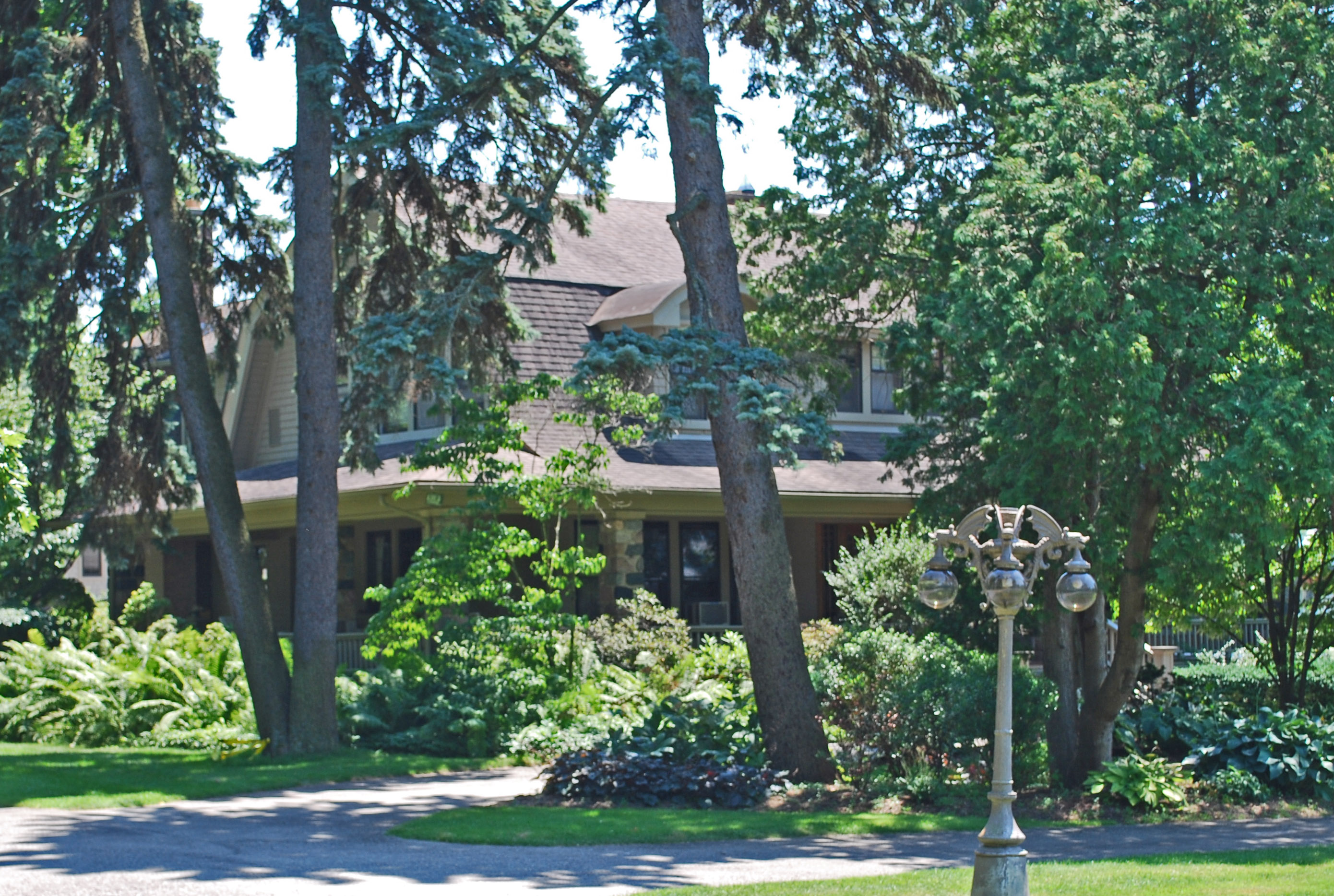
- Interactive map
- Location: 290 Chesterfield, Bloomfield Hills, Michigan
- Coordinates: 42°33′47″N 83°13′53″W
- Area: 1.3 acres (0.53 ha)
- Built: 1910
- Architectural style: Colonial Revival
- NRHP reference No.: 08000223
- Added to NRHP: March 25, 2008

The John & Mary Elizabeth Booth Endicott House is a private house located at 290 Chesterfield in Bloomfield Hills, Michigan. It was listed on the National Register of Historic Places in 2008.

== History ==
Beginning in the late nineteenth century, Bloomfield Township became a fashionable area for wealthy Detroit businessmen wanting a country estate. One of those wealthy businessmen was John Endicott. Endicott graduated from Harvard in 1889 and arrived in Detroit in 1891 to work in his uncle's dry goods business, Newcomb, Endicott & Company. The company had been established in 1868, and by the 1890s was a prosperous Detroit retail store. Endicott started as a bookkeeper, was admitted as a partner in 1896 upon his uncle's death, and was appointed treasurer of the firm in 1903 when it incorporated.

John Endicott married his second wife, Mary Elizabeth Booth, in 1902, after the death of his first wife in 1900. In 1905, the couple purchased this lot of 94 acres for their country estate. The property contained a mill pond and a farmhouse, and in 1906 the Endicotts moved into the farmhouse permanently. They established a stock farm, constructing new barns on the property. They constructed this new house at some later point, likely around 1910.

The Endicotts continued to live in this house, although John Endicott continued his business dealings in Detroit, first at Newcomb, Endicott & Company until its sale to Hudson's in 1927, and then in other capacities. In 1928 the Endicotts subdivided part of their farm acreage into 26 lots, keeping the 64 acre section around the house. They lived there until Mary's death in 1944. John Endicott lived in the house until 1954, when he sold the property to Donald and Florence James, who subdivided the remaining acreage into 38 lots, leaving two acres around this house.

== Description ==
The Endicott House is a two-story wood-frame Dutch Colonial Revival house with Arts and Crafts influences. The front facade has a wraparound porch with a center projection, supported by fieldstone piers. A central entrance door is flanked by multi-light sidelights. Four one-over-one wood sash windows are on each side of the entry. On the second floor are two arched dormers with paired nine-over-one windows, linked by a shed-roofed dormer containing four six-over-one windows.

The wraparound porch continues to the side elevations, where it accesses decorative French doors on each side. At the rear are two gambrel roofed projections.

== See also ==
- National Register of Historic Places listings in Oakland County, Michigan
