= Noida Supertech Twin Towers =

Tallest structures voluntarily demolished in India

Supertech Twin Towers
- सुपरटेक ट्विन टावर्स
- Interactive map of the Supertech Twin Towers area

General information
- Status: Demolished
- Type: Residential
- Location: Emerald Court, Sector-93A, Noida, Uttar Pradesh, India
- Coordinates: 28.5190°N 77.3818°E
- Construction started: November 2009; 16 years ago
- Completed: N/A
- Demolished: 28 August 2022; 4 years ago

Height
- Height: Actual; Apex: 102 m (335 ft); Ceyane: 95 m (312 ft)

Technical details
- Floor count: Planned; Apex:40; Ceyane: 40; Actual; Apex: 32; Ceyane: 29

Design and construction
- Developer: Supertech Limited

Website
- www.supertechlimited.com/residential/apex-tower-expressway-noida/index.php

The Apex Tower and Ceyane Tower, colloquially referred to as the Noida Supertech Twin Towers, were incomplete residential buildings in Sector-93A, Noida, Uttar Pradesh, India. The towers were part of real estate company Supertech Limited's Emerald Court residential complex. The Supreme Court of India upheld the original decision by the Allahabad High Court and ordered the buildings' demolition on 28 August 2022. They were the tallest structures in India to be voluntarily demolished.

== History ==
On 23 November 2004, the New Okhla Industrial Development Authority (NOIDA Authority) allotted M/s Supertech Limited, a plot of land measuring 48,263 square metre (11.92 acres) in Sector-93A. The plan for the Emerald Court residential complex in Noida came into inception in June 2005. The original plan according to plans submitted by the NOIDA Authority in the city, called for Emerald Court to have 14 buildings and included 3, 4 and 5 BHK flats.

It was in 2009, that plans for the twin towers, Apex and Ceyane, were added to the Emerald Court development. There were originally conceived as 24-storey structures to be built on a triangular site originally allotted for a green area.

Supertech modified their plan for a third time in March 2012. By that time the plan for Emerald Court was revised to include 15 buildings instead of 14, the number of floors for each building was increased to eleven from nine The twin towers' height were increased from 20 to 40.

== Legal case ==
The legal dispute began in 2009 when four residents raised concern regarding Supertech Limited's violation of building by-laws by building the twin towers. The core team of Emerald Court Owner Residents Welfare Association (ECO RWA) included Uday Bhan Singh Teotia (ex- DIG of CRPF), SK Sharma, Ravi Bajaj, and MK Jain.

Shortly after, in 2010, the builder started digging up more areas, where a shopping complex and garden had been planned. They then found out that the builder was planning two new 40-floor towers in that area – Apex and Ceyanne. The legal expenses amounted to almost Rs 1 crore (Rs 10 million). MK Jain, who died in 2021 due to COVID, led the team and raised money.

In mid-2012, residents of Emerald Court filed a case before the Allahabad High Court seeking for the demolition of the twin towers. In April 2014, the high court ruled in favor of the residents. The matter reached to the Supreme Court of India, which upheld the Allahabad High Court decision on August 31, 2021. The construction of the towers violated India's National Building Code, 2005 (NBC).

The Forum For People's Collective Efforts (FPCE), hailed the decision as a landmark ruling in the history of India's real estate industry and mentioned that the case should serve as a deterrent against illegal construction. The Supreme Court directed that all home buyers be refunded with 12% interest rate. They also awarded the Emerald Court RWA to be paid Rs 2 crores.

== Demolition ==
The Supreme Court originally set 21 August 2022 as the deadline for the Supertech Twin Towers' demolition. However this was extended by a week to 28 August, and a buffer period (29 August to 4 September) was given as a contingency for any marginal delay due to weather conditions. The Noida authority and Roorkee-based Central Building Research Institute (CBRI) tasked Edifice Engineering and South African firm Jet Demolition to demolish the buildings. The buildings were brought down through implosion.

The blast took place on 28 August 2022 at around 2:30 pm. An estimated 3,700 kilograms of explosives were poured into more than 9,000 holes in the structures.

On 28 August 2022 at 2:30 pm, the towers were demolished after the implosion in about 10 seconds. Around 10,000 people watched the implosion.

=== Impact on the environment ===
Experts were concerned about the birds in the area of the demolition and dust pollution due to the debris. The Air quality index (AQI) before and just after the demolition was 108 and 676 respectively.

=== Operation ===
This was the biggest operation and demolition ever done in India as this structure was higher than Qutb Minar (72.5 metres). 9640 drill holes were made in the columns of both the towers and more than 3,700 kg of explosives were used for the demolition.

== Architecture and design ==
The Noida Supertech Twin Towers consisted of two buildings, Apex and Ceyane Towers. They were planned to have 40 floors each. The two structures had different heights. Apex had 32 floors and stood at 103 metres (338 ft) tall while Ceyane had 29 floors and stood at 97 metres (318 ft). Both towers were intended to have 915 flats, 21 commercial shops, and two basements.

== Timeline ==
- Nov 2004: The NOIDA Authority allots plot of land for the construction of apartment.
- Nov 2009: Construction work is started by the builder Supertech Limited.
- Aug 2022: The Twin Towers are demolished on 28 August 2022 at 2:30 pm (IST).
