= Deconstruction (building) =

Selective dismantlement of building components

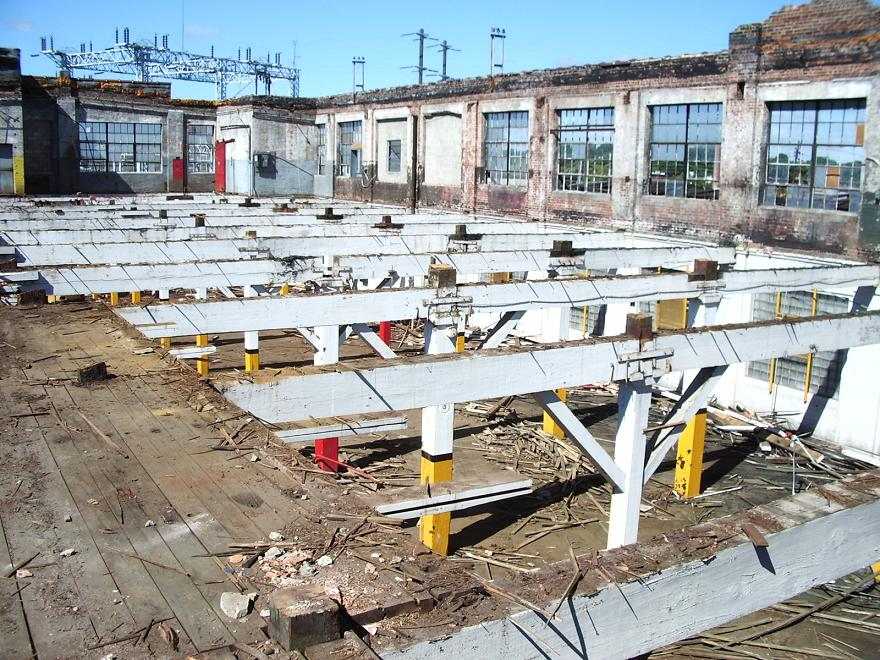
Deconstruction of a building.

In the context of physical construction, deconstruction is the selective dismantlement of building components, specifically for reuse, repurposing, recycling, and waste management. It differs from demolition where a site is cleared of its building by the most expedient means. Deconstruction has also been defined as "construction in reverse". Deconstruction requires a substantially higher degree of hands-on labor than does traditional demolition, but as such provides a viable platform for unskilled or unemployed workers to receive job skills training. The process of dismantling structures is an ancient activity that has been revived by the growing fields of sustainable and green building.

When buildings reach the end of their useful life, they are typically demolished and hauled to landfills. Building implosions or 'wrecking-ball' style demolitions are relatively inexpensive and offer a quick method of clearing sites for new structures. On the other hand, these methods create substantial amounts of waste. Components within old buildings may still be valuable, sometimes more valuable than at the time the building was constructed. Deconstruction is a method of harvesting what is commonly considered "waste" and reclaiming it into useful building material. Most modern buildings are difficult to deconstruct due to the designs of such buildings.

== Contribution to sustainability ==
Deconstruction has strong ties to environmental sustainability. In addition to giving materials a new life cycle, deconstructing buildings helps to lower the need for virgin resources. This in turn leads to energy and emissions reductions from the refining and manufacture of new materials, especially when considering that an estimated 40% of global material flows can be attributed to construction, maintenance, and renovation of structures. As deconstruction is often done on a local level, many times on-site, energy and emissions are also saved in the transportation of materials. Deconstruction can potentially support communities by providing local jobs and renovated structures. Deconstruction creates 6-8 jobs, for every job created by traditional demolition. In addition, solid waste from conventional demolition is diverted from landfills. This is a major benefit because construction and demolition waste accounts for approximately 20% - 40% of the solid waste stream. 90% of this construction and demolition waste stream is generated during the process of demolition. In 2015 548 million tons of construction and demolition waste were created in the United States alone.

Deconstruction allows for substantially higher levels of material reuse and recycling than does conventional processes of demolition. Up to 25% of material in a traditional residential structure can be readily reused, while up to 70% of material can be recycled.

In 2022, The Catherine Commons Deconstruction Project at Cornell University showcased the environmental benefits of deconstruction. By recycling and reusing about 90% of the building materials, such as fir, oak, and walnut boards, this project highlighted a significant reduction in waste and resource use compared to traditional demolition.

== Benefits of avoiding wood waste ==
In Canada, the CO_{2} Neutral Alliance has created a website with resources for regulators and municipalities, developers and contractors, business owners and operators, and individuals and households. Benefits for municipalities include:

- Reducing disposal costs where waste collection, hauling or disposal is supported by the tax base
- Establishing additional revenue streams
- Making existing landfills last longer
- Reducing greenhouse gas emissions caused by the decomposition of wood waste into methane from landfills
- Stimulating local economies with new industries and employment

Improving the local environment and overall sustainability of your community For every three square feet of deconstruction, enough lumber can be salvaged to build one square foot of new construction. At this rate, if deconstruction replaced residential demolition, the United States could generate enough recovered wood to construct 120,000 new affordable homes each year. The deconstruction of a typical 2,000-square-foot (190 m^{2}) wood-frame home can yield 6,000 board feet of reusable lumber. Every year the United States buries about 33 million tons of wood-related construction and demolition debris in landfills. As anaerobic microorganisms decompose this wood, it will release about five million tons of carbon equivalent in the form of methane gas.

== Typical methods of deconstruction ==
Deconstruction is commonly separated into two categories; structural and non-structural. Non-structural deconstruction, also known as "soft-stripping", consists of reclaiming non-structural components, appliances, doors, windows, and finish materials. The reuse of these types of materials is commonplace and considered to be a mature market in many locales.

Structural deconstruction involves dismantling the structural components of a building. Traditionally this had only been performed to reclaim expensive or rare materials such as used brick, dimension stone, and extinct wood. In antiquity, it was common to raze stone buildings and reuse the stone; it was also common to steal stones from a building that was not being totally demolished: this is the literal meaning of the word dilapidated. Used brick and dimension limestone, in particular, have a long tradition of reuse due to their durability and color changes over time. Recently, the rise of environmental awareness and sustainable building has made a much wider range of materials worthy of structural deconstruction. Low-end, commonplace materials such as dimensional lumber have become part of this newly emerging market.

The United States military has used structural deconstruction in many of its bases. The construction methods of barracks, among other base structures, are usually relatively simple. They typically contained large amounts of lumber and used minimal adhesives and finish-work. In addition, the buildings are often identical, making the process of deconstructing multiple buildings much easier. Many barracks were the era prior to WWII, and have aged to the point where they now need to be torn down. Deconstruction was deemed very practical due to the abundance of labor the military has access to and the value of the materials themselves.

Natural disasters, such as hurricanes, floods, tsunamis, and earthquakes often leave a vast amount of usable building materials in their wake. Structures that remain standing are often deconstructed to provide materials for rebuilding the region.

== Economic potential ==
Deconstruction's economic viability varies from project to project. The amount of time and cost of labor are the main drawbacks. Harvesting materials from a structure can take weeks, whereas demolition may be completed in roughly a day. However, some of the costs, if not all, can be recovered. Reusing the materials in a new on-site structure, selling reclaimed materials, donating materials for income tax write-offs, and avoiding landfill "tipping fees" are all ways in which the cost of deconstruction can be made comparable to demolition.

Reclaiming the materials for a new on-site structure is the most economically and environmentally efficient option. Tipping fees and the costs of new materials are avoided; in addition, the transportation of the materials is non-existent. Selling the used materials or donating them to non-profit organizations are another effective way of gaining capital. Donations to non-profits such as Habitat for Humanity's ReStore are tax-deductible. Many times it is possible to claim the value to be half of what that particular material would cost new. When donating rare or antique components it is sometimes possible to claim a higher value than a comparable, brand-new material.

Value can also be added to new structures that are built by implementing reused materials. The United States Green Building Council's program entitled Leadership in Energy and Environmental Design (LEED) offers seven credits relating to reusing materials. This accounts for seven out of a maximum sixty-nine credits. These include credits for building-shell reuse, material reuse, and diverting waste from landfills. Building shell-reuse is particularly appropriate for shells made of dimension stone.

Deconstruction is well suited to job training for the construction trades. Taking down a building can help a worker to learn how to put a different building up. Unskilled and low-skilled workers can receive on-the-job training in use of basic carpentry tools and techniques, as well as learning teamwork, problem-solving, critical thinking and good work habits. For example, Buffalo ReUse was founded as a non-profit deconstruction firm in 2006 to dismantle abandoned properties within Buffalo, New York and provide jobs for residents of the low-income East Side.

== Process ==
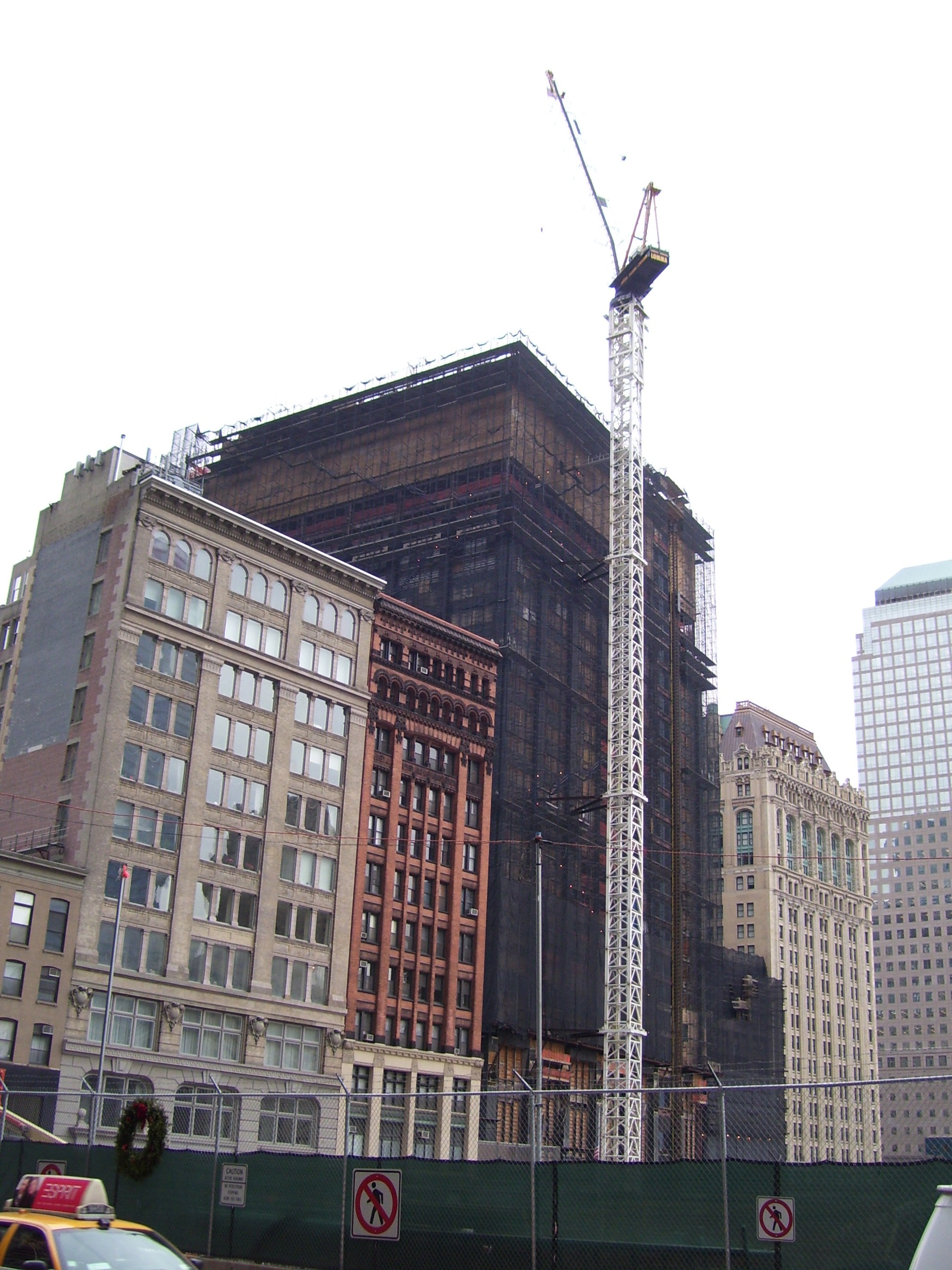
Dismantling the Deutsche Bank Building in January 2008.

When choosing to deconstruct a building there are some important aspects that need to be taken into consideration. Developing a list of local contacts that are able to take used materials is an essential first step. These might include commercial architectural salvage businesses, reclamation yards, non-profit and social enterprise salvage warehouses, and dismantling contractors. Materials that cannot be salvaged may be recycled on-site or off-site, or taken to landfills. The next step involves identifying which, if any, are hazardous materials. Lead paint and asbestos are two substances in particular that need to be handled extremely cautiously and disposed of properly.

Salvaged goods that are contaminated with hazardous materials such as lead paint will need additional processing in order to be reused again, which adds an additional cost barrier to the effective reuse of certain materials reclaimed in a deconstruction project. To address this challenge, some deconstruction contractors have begun using specialized sealed processing trailers that use negative pressure to provide on-site lead remediation processing for salvaged timber.

The following set of questions can aid in developing a deconstruction plan:

- What parts of the building support other parts?
- What parts of the building are self-supporting?
- Where do specialized service inputs and outputs (telecommunications, electricity, water, gas, wastewater, supply and exhaust air) occur and how are these flow mechanisms constructed?
- What parts of the building are subject to the most stresses from climate?
- What parts of the building are most subject to wear from human use and change from aesthetic preference?
- What parts of the building are most subject to alteration based upon functional, economic, life-expectancy, or technological requirements?
- What parts of the building are composed of components and sub-components based upon a complex set of functional requirements and what parts serve only one function and hence are composed of relatively homogeneous materials?
- What parts of a building pose the greatest worker hazards in disassembly?
- What are the functional sizes of the principal elements and components of a building?
- What are the most expensive elements of a building, which have the highest reuse and recycling value and which impact the life-cycle efficiency of a building the most?

It is common practice, and common sense, to "soft-strip" the structure first; remove all appliances, windows, doors, and other finishing materials. These will account for a large percentage of the marketable components. After the non-structural deconstruction, structural is the next step. It is best to start at the roof and work down to the foundation.

Building components that are dismantled will need to be stored in a secure, dry location. This will protect them from water damage and theft. Once separated from the structure, materials can also be cleaned and refinished to increase value. Building an inventory list of the materials at hand will help determine where each item will be sent.

== Deconstruction vs. demolition ==
Compared to demolition, deconstruction of a building is much safer method for the environment as well as human health in terms of air pollution. Structures are usually taken down using implosion, where explosives are used to implode the building on itself. This causes a variety of harmful substances to enter the atmosphere and affect air quality.

Although not due to implosion, the environmental health effects of the World Trade Center's destruction in the September 11, 2001 attacks serve as a good reference point for the harmful effects of demolition. The collapse of the Twin Towers had some similarities to a controlled demolition, and caused the release of harmful and toxic particles into the air, including pulverized concrete and other fine particulate silica, which are known to cause silicosis; and carcinogens such as asbestos, lead, and dioxins The immediate aftermath of 9/11 saw a significant increase in respiratory disease-related hospitalization, and as of 2021, 5000 people had died from health effects from 9/11. Deconstruction can be considered a healthier alternative to demolition due to the fact that it does not share the same negative effects to air quality.

Deconstruction can also aid in the recycling and management of construction waste.

== Designing for deconstruction (DfD) ==
An upstream approach to deconstruction can be implemented into buildings during their design process, known as designing for deconstruction (DfD). This is a current trend in sustainable architecture. DfD structures typically use simple construction methods combined with high-grade, durable materials. Separating layers of a building's infrastructure and making them visible can significantly simplify its deconstruction. Making components within systems separable also assists in being able to dismantle materials quickly and efficiently. This can be achieved by using mechanical fasteners such as bolts to connect parts. Allowing physical access to these fasteners is another necessary aspect of this design, as well as the use of standardized materials assembled consistently throughout the project.

Consolidation of plumbing, HVAC, and other utility service points within a building reduces the need for long service lines, as well as points of entanglement and conflict with other building elements. Similarly, using raised floor or dropped ceiling methods allows easier access to mechanical and electrical services, and can reduce the time needed to remove these components during the process of deconstruction.

Some conventional construction methods and materials are difficult or impossible to deconstruct; the use of nails and adhesives significantly slows down the deconstruction process and can render unusable materials that could otherwise be reused. The presence of hazardous materials is also an obstacle for deconstruction. Using mixed material grades makes the process of identifying pieces for resale difficult.

Some commercial buildings that have been designed according to DfD principles use built in anchor points and other features intended to provide additional fall protection options. Such design considerations can increase overall worker safety, and decrease amount of overall time spent on deconstruction.

DfD not only enables the end of a building's life-cycle, but can also make the building easier to maintain and adapt to new uses. Saving the shell of a building or adapting interior spaces to meet new needs can reduce the environmental impact of new structures.

Other approaches include modular building, like the Habitat 67 project in Montreal, Quebec, Canada. This was a residential structure consisting of separate, functional apartments that could be put together in a variety of ways. As people moved in or out, the units could be reconfigured as needed.

== See also ==
- Articulation
- Concrete recycling
- Denailer
- Dimension stone
- Green building
- Modular construction systems
- Recycling timber
- Repurposed building stone
- Reverse engineering
- Slighting
- Structure relocation
