= Building implosion =

Method of demolition involving explosives

AfE-Turm building demolition slow motion video

Implosion of the Athlone Power Station cooling towers

Blasting of a highway bridge in Aachen, Germany

Explosives demolition, also referred to as implosion, is a demolition method that involves the strategic placing of explosives and timing of its detonation so that a structure collapses on itself in a matter of seconds. It is used to safely destroy tall buildings, bridges, smokestacks, towers and tunnels. This is typically done to save time and money of what would otherwise be an extensive demolition process with conventional construction equipment, as well as to protect construction workers from infrastructure that is in severe disrepair.

The actual use of the term "implosion" to refer to the destruction of a building is a misnomer, as an actual implosion involves a structure being subjected to extreme external pressure, pushing it inwards in itself.

== Terminology ==
Implosion of Radio Network House, damaged by the 2011 Christchurch earthquake, in the Christchurch Central City

The term "implosion" was coined by my grandmother back in, I guess, the '60s. It's a more descriptive way to explain what we do than "explosion". There are a series of small explosions, but the building itself isn't erupting outward. It's actually being pulled in on top of itself. What we're really doing is removing specific support columns within the structure and then cajoling the building in one direction or another, or straight down.

— Stacey Loizeaux, NOVA, December 1996

The term building implosion can be misleading to a layperson: The technique is not a true implosion phenomenon. A true implosion usually involves a difference between internal (lower) and external (higher) pressure, or inward and outward forces, that is so large that the structure collapses inward into itself.

In contrast, building implosion techniques do not rely on the difference between internal and external pressure to collapse a structure. Instead, the goal is to induce a progressive collapse by weakening or removing critical supports; therefore, the building can no longer withstand gravity loads and will fail under its own weight.

Numerous small explosives, strategically placed within the structure, are used to catalyze the collapse. Nitroglycerin, dynamite, or other explosives are used to shatter reinforced concrete supports. Linear shaped charges are used to sever steel supports. These explosives are progressively detonated on supports throughout the structure. Then, explosives on the lower floors initiate the controlled collapse.

A simple structure like a chimney can be prepared for demolition in less than a day. Larger or more complex structures can take up to six months of preparation to remove internal walls and wrap columns with fabric and fencing before firing the explosives.

== Historical overview ==
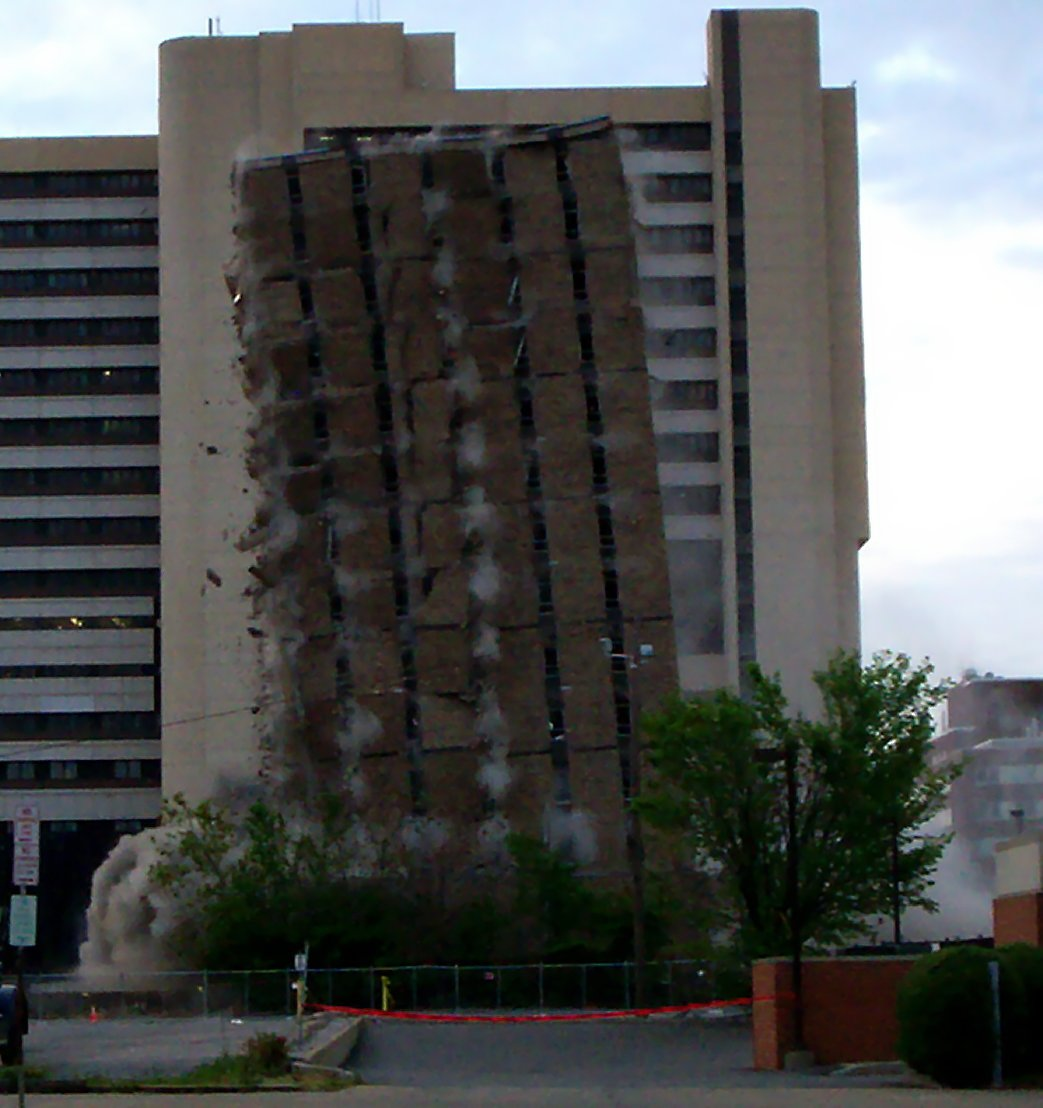
Demolition by controlled explosion in Buffalo, New York

The demolition of the New Haven Coliseum in New Haven, Connecticut

As part of the demolition industry, the history of building implosion is tied to the development of explosives technology.

One of the earliest documented attempts at building implosion was the 1773 razing of Holy Trinity Cathedral in Waterford, Ireland with 150 lb (68.04 kg; 10.71 st) of gunpowder, a huge amount of explosive material at the time. The use of low velocity explosives produced a deafening explosion that instantly reduced the building to rubble.

The late 19th century saw the erection of—and ultimately the need to demolish—the first skyscrapers, which had more complicated structures, allowing greater heights. This led to other considerations in the explosives demolition of buildings, such as worker and spectator safety and limiting collateral damage. Benefiting from the availability of dynamite, a high-velocity explosive based on a stabilized form of nitroglycerine, and borrowing from techniques used in rock-blasting, such as staggered detonation of several small charges, the process of building implosion gradually became more efficient.

Following World War II, European demolition experts, faced with huge reconstruction projects in dense urban areas, gathered practical knowledge and experience for bringing down large structures without harming adjacent properties. This led to the emergence of a demolition industry that grew and matured during the latter half of the twentieth century. At the same time, the development of more efficient high-velocity explosives, such as RDX, and non-electrical firing systems combined to make this a period of time in which the building implosion technique was extensively used.

Popular Science Magazine, in 1959, published a series of photos of a building demolition by Jack Loizeaux—about a year before he incorporated his Maryland firm Controlled Demolition, Inc. In Washington DC, an 8-story apartment building was being removed from the site of the new State Department Building: "He laced the structure with 200 pounds of dynamite, set in half-pound charges to go off at split-second intervals....The building was down in 15 seconds flat....and all the rubble was in one neat pile."

Meanwhile, public interest in the spectacle of controlled building implosion also grew. In 1993, MTV held a live broadcast of the demolition of two warehouses in Louisville, Kentucky, to promote the movie Demolition Man. On October 31, 1994, Philadelphia's Sears Eastern Regional Catalogue Headquarters was demolished, with an estimated 50,000 onlookers. Thomas Mazza, vice president of Mercer Wrecking, estimated the building's size as 25 million cubic feet, exceeding the size of the previous "largest implosion" record cited by Guinness, the Traymore Hotel in Atlantic City. The Las Vegas Strip has become well-known for making spectacles out of hotel implosions, of which around a dozen have taken place there since 1993.

Evolution in the mastery of controlled demolition led to the world record demolition of the Seattle Kingdome on March 26, 2000.

In 1997, the Royal Canberra Hospital in Canberra, Australia, was demolished. The main building did not fully disintegrate and had to be manually demolished. The explosion during the initial demolition attempt was not contained on the site and large pieces of debris were projected towards spectators 500 m (1,600 ft) away, in a location considered safe for viewing. A twelve-year-old girl was killed instantly, and nine others were injured. Large fragments of masonry and metal were found 650 m (2,100 ft) from the demolition site.

On October 24, 1998, the J. L. Hudson Department Store and Addition in Detroit, Michigan became the tallest, and the largest, building ever imploded.

On February 25, 2007, an unfinished Intel building known as the Intel Shell, on which construction had been halted in April 2001, was imploded in Austin, Texas.

The 2008 movie The Dark Knight features the demolition of the former Brach's candy factory in Chicago, disguised as a building complex in Gotham City being attacked.

On December 13, 2009, an unfinished 31-story condominium tower, known as the Ocean Tower (The Leaning Tower of South Padre Island), was imploded in South Padre Island, Texas. Construction on the new tower had begun in 2006, but it had been sinking unevenly during construction, which halted in 2008, and could not be saved. It is believed to be one of the tallest reinforced concrete structures ever imploded.

Building implosion has been successfully used at Department of Energy sites such as the Savannah River Site (SRS) in South Carolina and the Hanford Site in Washington. The SRS 185-3K or "K" Area Cooling Tower, built in 1992 to cool the water from the K Reactor, was no longer needed when the Cold War ended and was safely demolished by explosives demolition on May 25, 2010.

The Hanford Site Buildings 337, 337B, and the 309 Exhaust Stack, built in the early 1970s and vacated in the mid-2000s due to deteriorating physical condition, were safely razed by explosives on October 9, 2010.

== Gallery ==
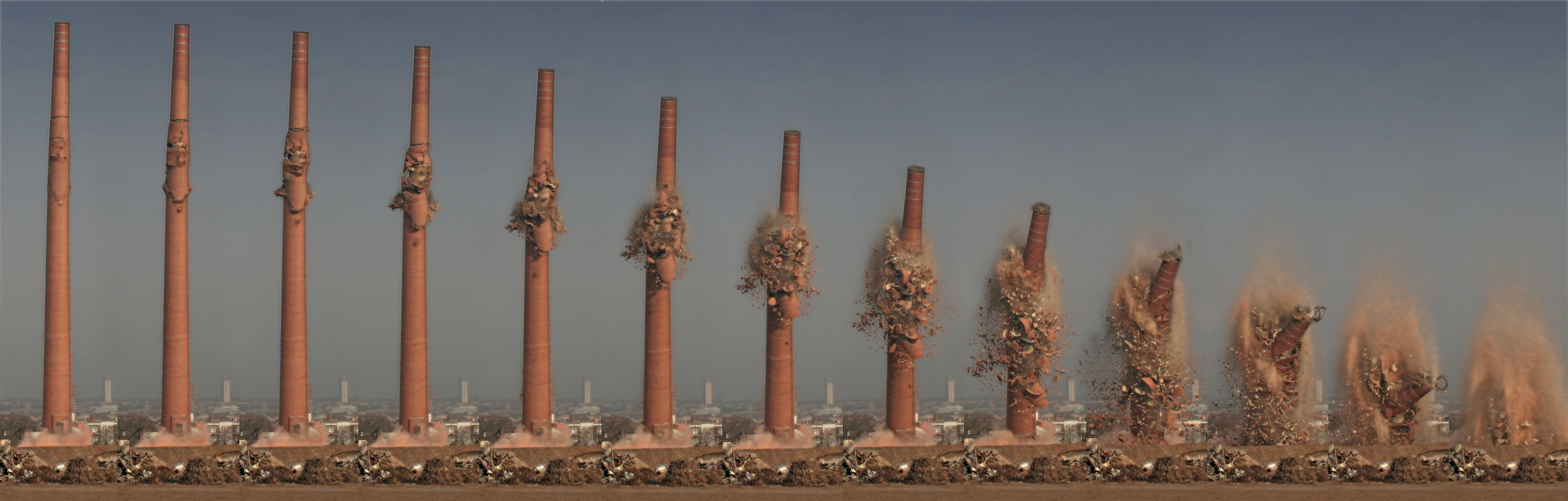
Demolition of a chimney at the former "Henninger Brewery" in Frankfurt am Main, Germany, on 2 December 2006

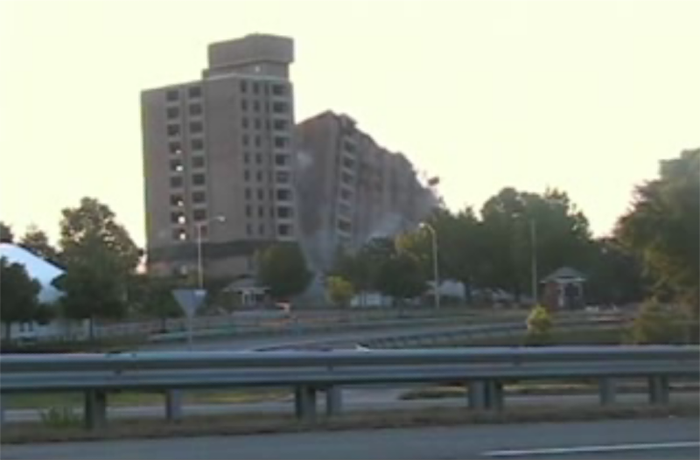
June 2006 demolition of the 12-story Tencza Apartment building in Arlington, Virginia. (See video)

Tappan Zee Bridge explosives demolition in slow motion

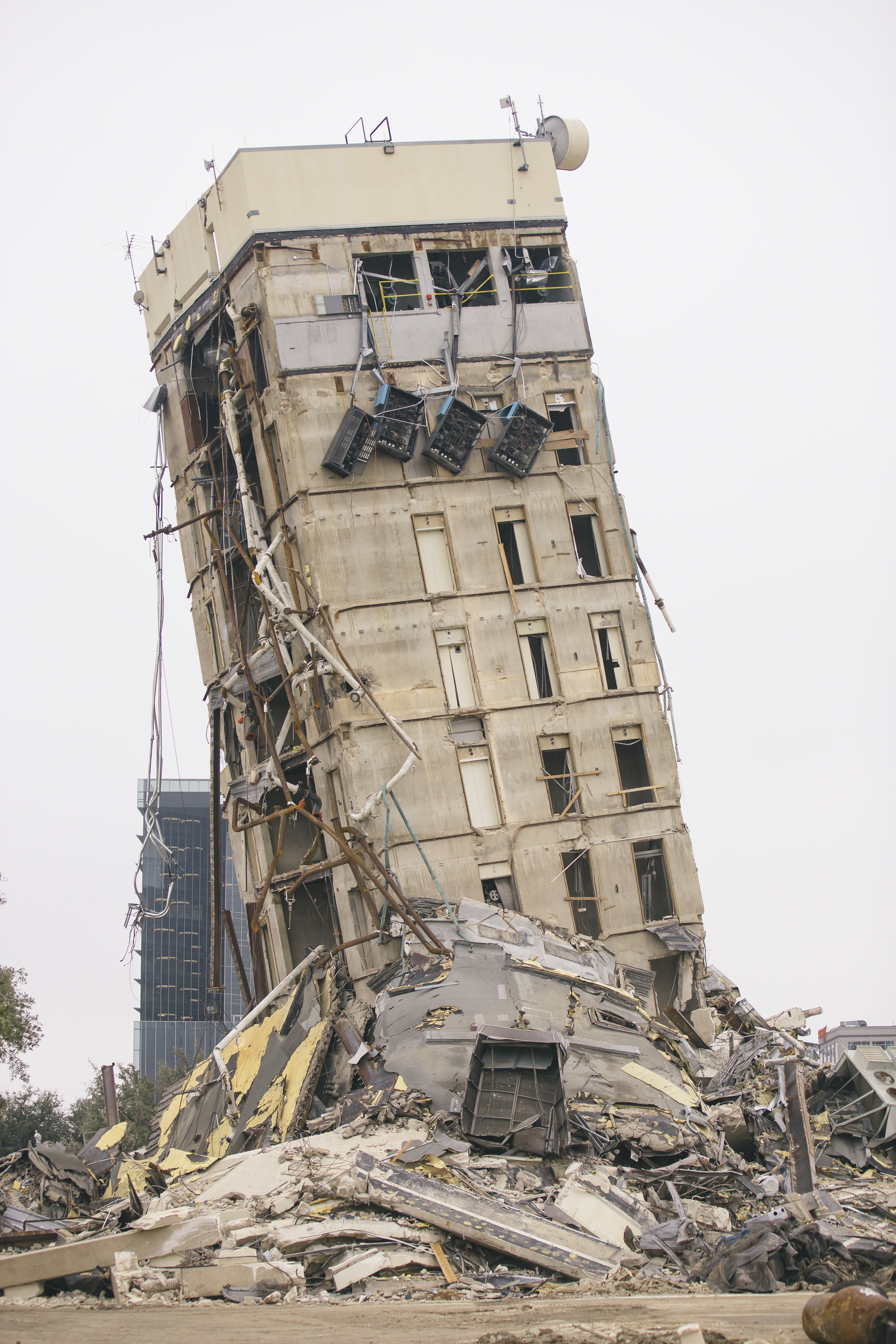
The core of an office building in Dallas, Texas, still standing after explosives failed to take it down in 2020.

== See also ==
- Controlled Demolition, Inc.
- List of tallest voluntarily demolished buildings
