= J. L. Hudson Department Store and Addition =

Former building in Detroit, Michigan

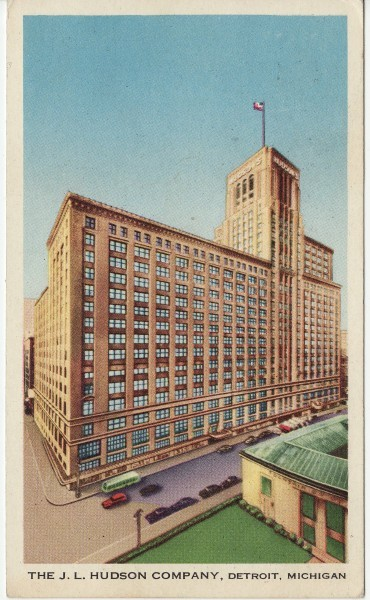
- Postcard c. 1951
- Interactive map of the J. L. Hudson Department Store and Addition area

General information
- Status: Demolished
- Type: Retail, Office space
- Location: 1206 Woodward Avenue; Detroit, Michigan
- Coordinates: 42.3337°N 83.0480°W
- Construction started: 1911
- Completed: 1946
- Opening: 1911
- Closed: January 17, 1983 to October 1986
- Demolished: October 1997 to October 24, 1998

Height
- Antenna spire: 520 ft (160 m)
- Roof: 439 ft (134 m)

Technical details
- Floor count: 29
- Floor area: 2,200,000 sq ft (200,000 m^{2})

Design and construction
- Architect: Smith, Hinchman, & Grylls

The J. L. Hudson Building ("Hudson's") was a department store located at 1206 Woodward Avenue in downtown Detroit, Michigan. It was constructed beginning in 1911, with additions throughout the years, before being "completed" in 1946, and named after the company's founder, Joseph Lowthian Hudson. Hudson's first building on the site opened in 1891 but was demolished in 1923 for a new structure. It was the flagship store for the Hudson's chain. The building was demolished in a controlled demolition on October 24, 1998, and at the time it was the tallest building ever imploded.

== The structure ==
Designed by Smith, Hinchman, & Grylls, Hudson's consisted of approximately 33 levels: five basements, main floor, mezzanine, 2nd through 15th floors, 15 1/2 floor, 16th through 21st floors, 21 1/2 floor, and 22nd through 25th floors. Only the upper two basements through the 12th floor covered the entire footprint of the structure. A tower rose over 400 feet above the Farmer Street side. On all four sides, porcelain-covered copper letters spelled "HUDSON'S" in red neon.

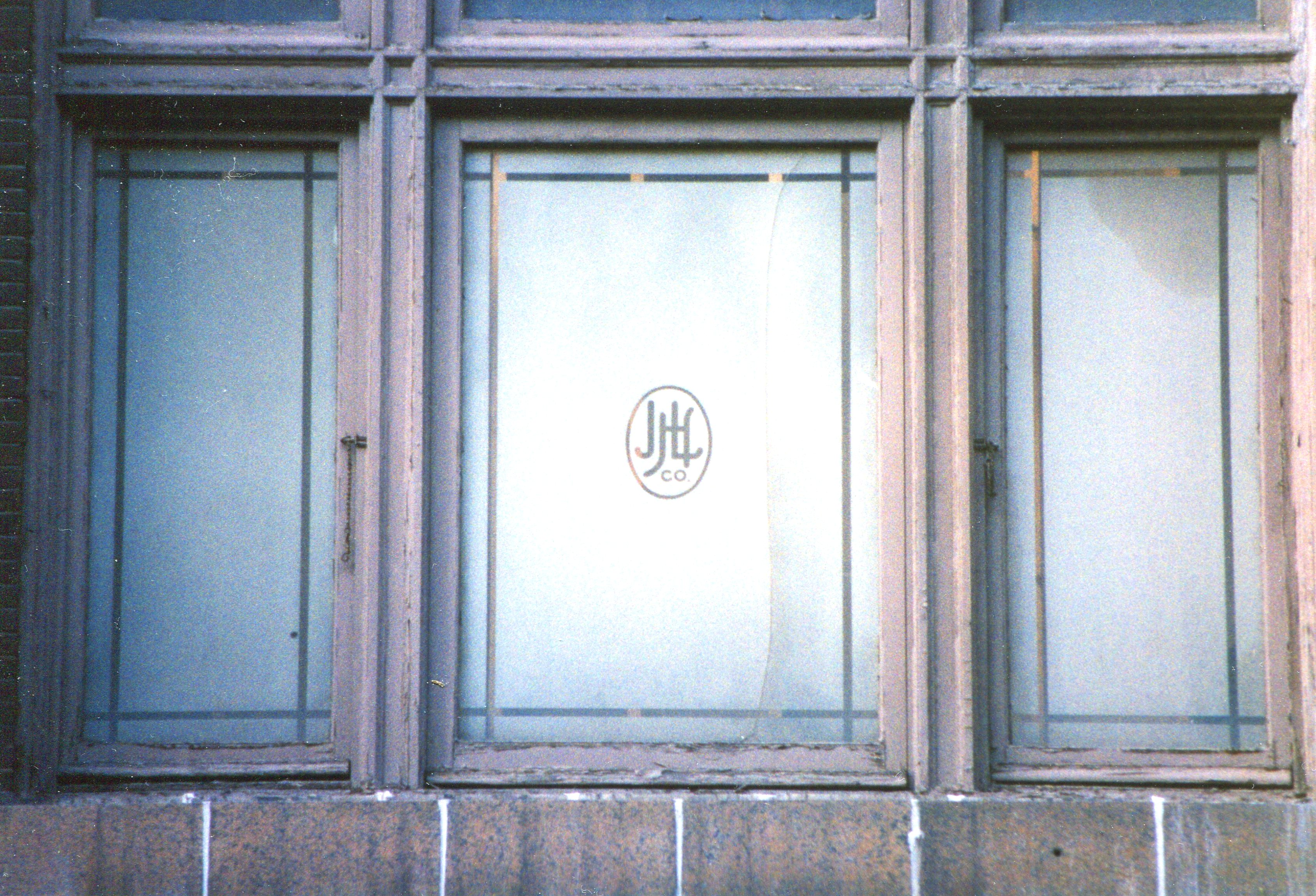
A window of the J. L. Hudson Building

Hudson's boasted about 2.2 million sq. ft. of retail and office space, included several restaurants and was built in the Chicago School architectural style. The facade was red brick above the second floor. Below that, it consisted of polished pink granite panels. Terra-cotta cornices and rosettes were extensively employed, along with ornamental ironwork. "JLH"-emblazoned ovals decorated frosted windows on the mezzanine and 3rd through 5th floors.

The building measured 439 feet (134 m) tall from its second basement to the top of the penthouse tower. It was also topped by a 110 feet (34 m) high flagpole.

The store closed January 17, 1983 (at the nadir of downtown Detroit's decline).

After closure, Hudson's maintained its headquarters staff of about 1,100 in the downtown structure. In May 1984, The J. L. Hudson Co. formally merged into the Department Store Division of the Dayton Hudson Corp., although Hudson's stores continued to carry the Hudson's name. All executive and buying positions transferred to Minneapolis, and other staff moved to space at the Northland Center store in Southfield. The last corporate department in the downtown Detroit building, credit operations, moved in October 1986. Dayton Hudson sold the building in December 1989.

Hudson's was demolished by Controlled Demolition, Inc. at 5:47 p.m. ET on October 24, 1998. 20,000 people watched as the building was imploded — turning it into a 60-foot (18 m) tall pile of debris. The demolition shattered windows on many then-still-abandoned retail buildings across Woodward Avenue, created a large debris and dust cloud that shrouded many parts of downtown Detroit as far south as Jefferson Avenue in dust (including thousands of people and vehicles) and accidentally damaged a section of the elevated Detroit People Mover. Many people watched the demolition from Hart Plaza at the foot of Woodward Avenue and Dieppe Gardens in Windsor.

The city constructed a 955-space, four-level underground parking garage at the site using parts of the basement of the demolished tower in 2001.

== Future ==
In November 2013, Bedrock Detroit, who would be granted development rights of the two-acre city-owned site, hired New York-based SHoP Architects and Detroit-based Hamilton Anderson Associates to lead the design process of redevelopment on the site. Bedrock broke ground on the development on December 14, 2017; the plans included a tower of 49 stories and 685 feet (209 m) and a mid-rise building of 14 stories. The project was expected to open in 2024, but was delayed with the office building now opening in 2026 and the tower in 2027. After several changes, the final structures were reduced to 45 and 12 floors.

== Records ==
- Tallest department store / retail building in the world.
- Second largest department store building in the United States, exceeded by Macy's Herald Square in New York City.
- Second tallest building to have a controlled implosion, tallest until the unfinished Meena Plaza I in Abu Dhabi was imploded in 2020.
- Second largest building to have a controlled implosion, after the Sears Merchandise Center in Philadelphia, which was imploded in 1994.

== See also ==
- List of tallest voluntarily demolished buildings
