= CAGA House =

Skyscraper in Sydney, Australia

Coordinates: 33.864°S 151.210°E

The CAGA House was a 30-storey skyscraper in Sydney, NSW, Australia. When it was completed in 1977, it was the 10th tallest building in Sydney. The building stood for only 15 years before being dismantled to make way for the Governor Phillip Tower. It was the tallest building in Sydney to be demolished until the nearby State Office Block was pulled down to make way for the Aurora Place.

The building was built on the site of the Hotel Metropole.

== See also ==
- List of tallest voluntarily demolished buildings
