= Hudson's =

American department store

The J. L. Hudson Company

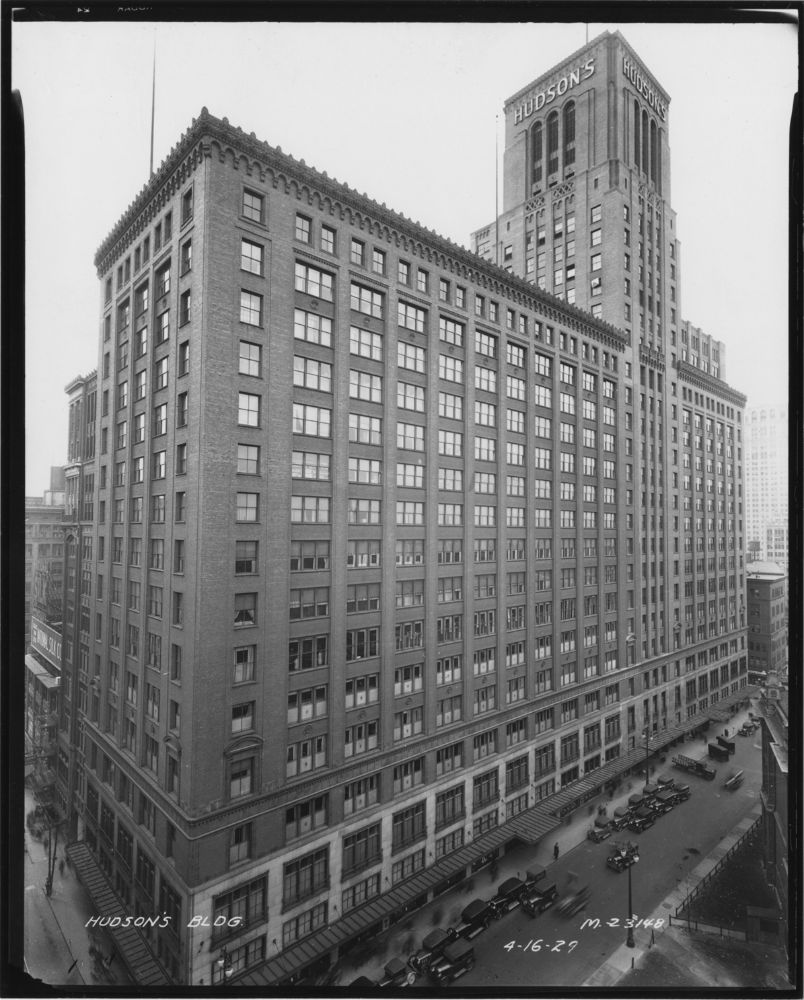
- Exterior of the former flagship store (c. 1929)
- Trade name: Hudson's
- Type: Subsidiary
- Industry: Retail
- Genre: Department stores
- Founded: 1881; 145 years ago in Detroit, Michigan, United States
- Founder: Joseph L. Hudson
- Defunct: 2001; 25 years ago
- Fate: Conversion to Marshall Field's
- Successor: Marshall Field's
- Headquarters: Detroit, Michigan, United States (1881–1969); Minneapolis, Minnesota, United States (1969–2001)
- Parent: Dayton Hudson Corporation (Note: Dayton Hudson Corporation was renamed Target Corporation in 2000.) (1969–2001)

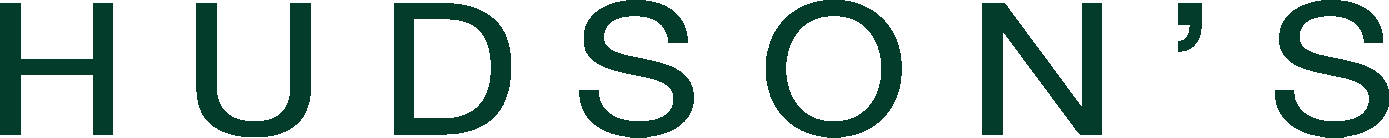
Hudson's_Department_Store_Final_Logo

The J. L. Hudson Company (commonly known simply as Hudson's) was an upscale retail department store chain based in Detroit, Michigan. Hudson's flagship store, on Woodward Avenue in Downtown Detroit (demolished October 24, 1998), was the tallest department store in the world in 1961, and, at one time, claimed to be the second-largest department store, after Macy's, in the United States, by square footage.

== Growth ==
Founded in 1881 by Joseph Lowthian Hudson, the store thrived during the record growth of Detroit and the auto industry in the first half of the 20th century. In 1909, J.L. Hudson invested in a start-up automobile manufacturer which was named the Hudson Motor Car Company in his honor. The Hudson Motor Car Company eventually became part of the American Motors Corporation and later Chrysler. Hudson operated the store until his death in 1912, when his four nephews (James, Joseph, Oscar, and Richard Webber) assumed control. The third generation of the family assumed control in 1961, when Joseph L. Hudson, Jr., became president of the company.

Hudson's various logos

Over time, the store grew from its beginnings in the Detroit Opera House to a 25-story building with 2,124,316 sq ft (197,355.4 m^{2}) and occupying an entire city block.

== Policies ==
Hudson's was known for customer satisfaction and its liberal return policy that would include even merchandise that customers had purchased years earlier but never used.

In 1952, Hudson's total sales were $175 million but issued refunds totaling $25 million. Store executives felt that to be a small price to pay for customer loyalty.

In addition to cultivating loyalty through sales policies, Hudson's was involved in the community. In 1924, two years prior to rival Macy's, it staged its first Thanksgiving Parade, which continues today. In 1923, it unveiled the world's largest flag, which covered 3,700 sq ft (340 m^{2}) of the Woodward facade of the building. The flag was displayed annually until it was replaced, in 1949, by a larger flag. In 1959, the store began sponsorship of the annual fireworks display that was part of the International Freedom Festival.

== Locations ==
Hudson's Budget Store occupied two full basement levels of the downtown store as well as several branches. It had an independent staff of buyers, carried its own line of merchandise, and was considered the greatest competition to the big store.

Hudson's expanded into suburban Detroit, starting with the anchor store at Northland Center in nearby Southfield, Michigan, the largest shopping center in the United States when it opened, in 1954. Similar suburban malls followed (Eastland Center in 1957 and Westland Center in 1965) as well as other locations throughout the tri-state region. The Dayton Co. of Minneapolis acquired The J.L. Hudson Co. in 1969 to form the Dayton–Hudson Corporation, the predecessor to Target Corporation, but "The J.L. Hudson Co." continued to operate as a semiautonomous entity. Dayton–Hudson eventually acquired and sold several other department store chains.

== Decline ==
Though customers flocked to the suburban locations, the downtown store still accounted for half of Hudson's business in 1961, but demographic changes continued to erode sales. Store officials even considered closing the store as early as 1971, citing $9,000,000 in pilferage, but decided to remain for fear of the potential backlash of city officials and customers. By 1978, they agreed to construct a smaller store of 320,000 sq ft (30,000 m^{2}) as part of a proposed downtown shopping center.

Lack of interest from other retailers and funding problems shelved the center, and after many years of declining sales and consolidating selling space, the flagship Hudson's store closed January 17, 1983, at nearly the lowest point of Downtown Detroit's decline.

After closure, Hudson's maintained its headquarters staff of about 1,100 in the downtown store. In May 1984, The J.L. Hudson Co. formally merged into The Department Store Division of the Dayton Hudson Corp., but Hudson's stores continued to carry the Hudson's name until 2001. All executive and buying positions transferred to Minneapolis, and other staff moved to space at the Northland store in Southfield. The last corporate department in the downtown Detroit building, credit operations, moved in October 1986. Dayton Hudson sold the building in December 1989, and it was imploded on October 24, 1998.

Hudson's operated a large warehouse complex in an area bounded by Madison, Brush, Adams and Beacon Streets in Downtown Detroit. The buildings were constructed between the 1920s and the 1950s and averaged between four and six floors. In the early 1980s, Building 3 was sold and renovated into Madison Center, home for the 36th District Court. The remaining buildings in the complex closed in the late 1990s to make room for the new 65,000-seat stadium, Ford Field. Ford Field partially incorporated one of the warehouses into its design.

The vacant site in Detroit between Woodward and Farmer Street and between E. Grand River and Gratiot was turned into an underground parking garage with supports in place for a future building. The address of the first Hudson's building on the lot was on Farmer, not at 1206 Woodward, the building's later and better-known address. In 2018 the parking garage at the former Hudson's site was demolished to make way for two new buildings on the former Hudson's site. One of these new buildings will be the second tallest building in Michigan upon its completion, project height of 685 feet (209 m).

In 2000, Dayton–Hudson Corporation took the name of its most successful operation, becoming Target Corporation, and one year, it later re-branded all Hudson's and Dayton's locations with the Marshall Field's moniker, an operation purchased by Dayton–Hudson in 1990. After being briefly owned by May Department Stores, the former Hudson's stores were acquired by Federated Department Stores in 2006 and all Marshall Field's stores were incorporated into the Macy's chain. Target still maintains a common law trademark in the use of Daytons.com and Hudsons.com, which both redirect to the Target website.

== See also ==
- Architecture of metropolitan Detroit
- Dayton's
- J. L. Hudson Department Store and Addition
- List of department stores converted to Macy's
