= Tun Razak Tower =

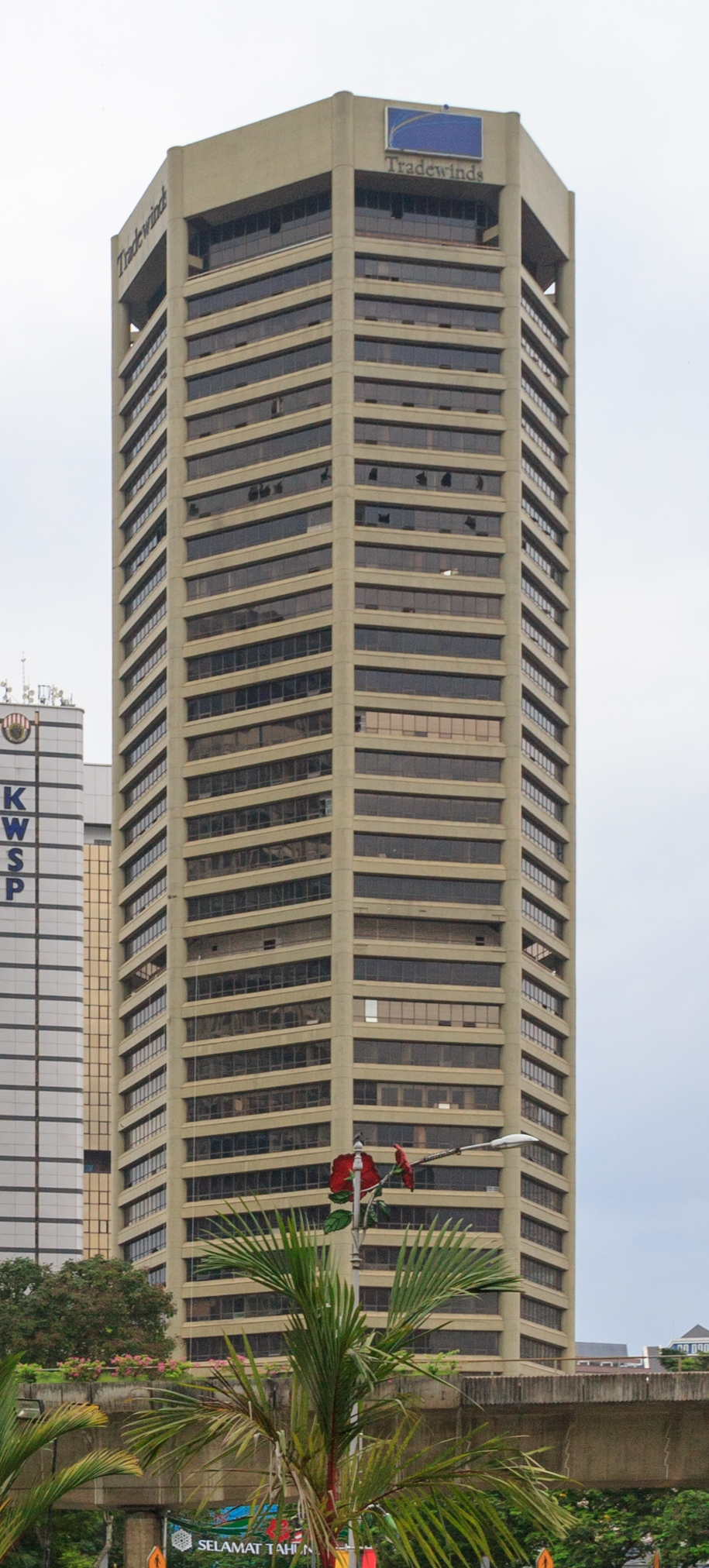

General information
- Status: Demolished
- Type: High-rise office building
- Architectural style: Modernism
- Location: Jalan Raja Laut, Kuala Lumpur, Malaysia
- Construction started: 1980
- Estimated completion: 1983
- Demolished: 2014

Technical details
- Floor count: 35

The Tun Razak Tower was a 35-storey office skyscraper located along Jalan Raja Laut in Kuala Lumpur, Malaysia, near the DBKL headquarters. The height of the building was 150 metres high. It was named after Malaysia’s second Prime Minister, Abdul Razak Hussein.

It was built in 1983 and demolished in 2014. When it was demolished, it was the tallest building in Malaysia ever to be demolished.

== Incidents ==
On 15 January 2014, a fire broke out at the 27th floor of the tower and reaching up to the 30th floor while the workers were cutting the air-conditioning ducts thus trapping them. It took a few hours for the flames to be doused by the firefighters. No casualties were reported but five workers were injured and later rushed to the Kuala Lumpur Hospital.

== See also ==
- List of tallest voluntarily demolished buildings
