= AfE-Turm =

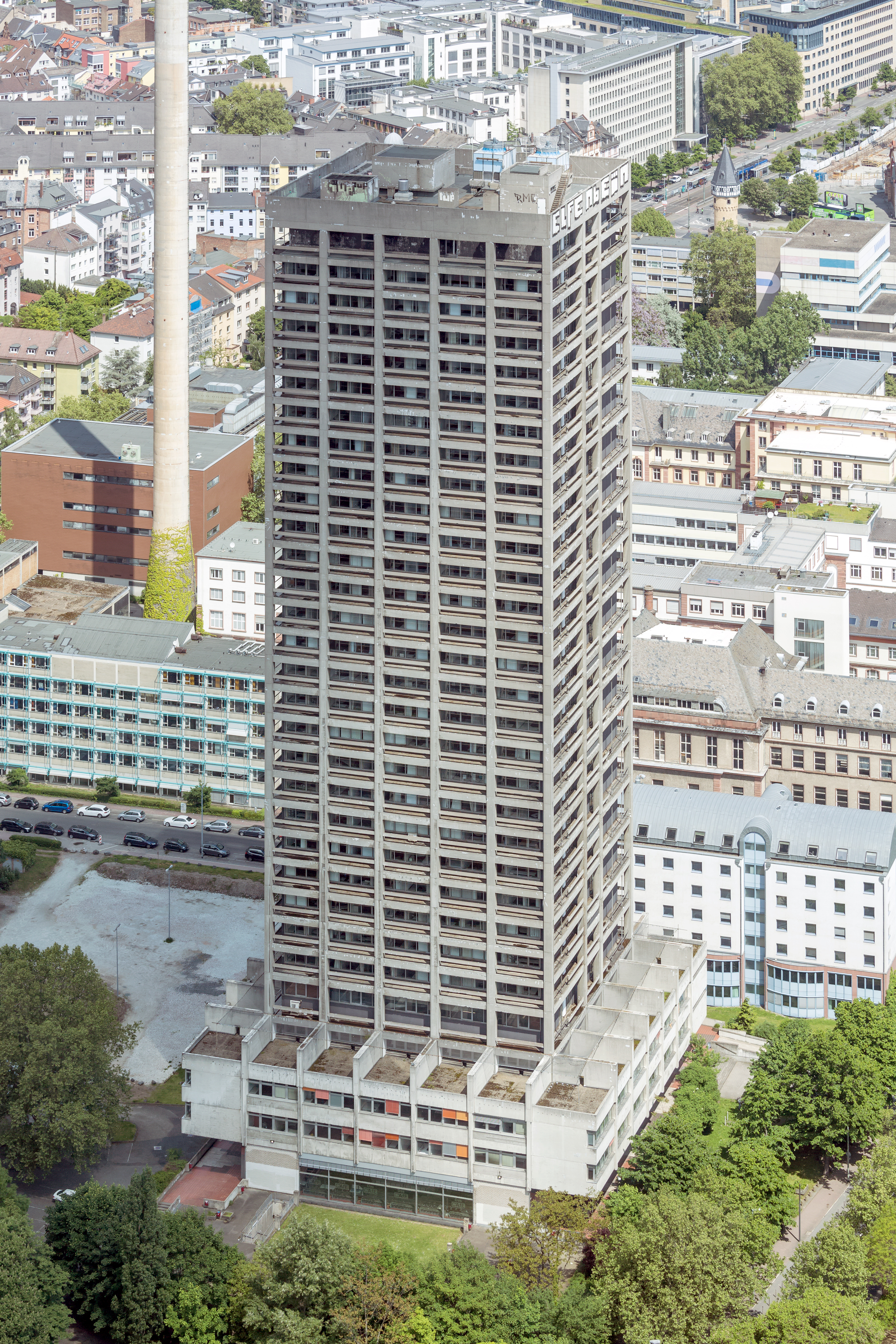
- Interactive map of the AfE-Turm area

General information
- Status: Demolished
- Type: University
- Architectural style: Brutalist
- Location: Robert-Mayer-Straße 5–7; Senckenberganlage 13-17; Frankfurt; Hesse, Germany
- Coordinates: 50.1161°N 8.65083°E
- Construction started: 1970
- Completed: 1972
- Demolished: 2 February 2014
- Owner: Johann Wolfgang Goethe University

Height
- Roof: 116 m (381 ft)

Technical details
- Floor count: 38

Design and construction
- Architects: Staatliches Universitätsbauamt; Staatliche Neubauleitung Frankfurt
- Engineer: BGS Ingenieursozietät
- Main contractor: Philipp Holzmann AG

Demolition video

AfE-Turm ('AfE Tower') was a 38-storey (30 floors on its south side and 22 floors on its north side), 116 m (381 ft) skyscraper in the Westend district of Frankfurt, Germany. It was the tallest building in Frankfurt from 1972 to 1974.

The building was part of the Bockenheim campus of the Johann Wolfgang Goethe University and until 2013 housed the offices and seminar rooms of the departments of Social Sciences and Education. AfE is an acronym for Abteilung für Erziehungswissenschaft (Department of Pedagogy); however, this department never moved in because it was closed before the construction of the tower was finished, which happened in 1972. The tower was demolished on 2 February 2014.

== Background ==
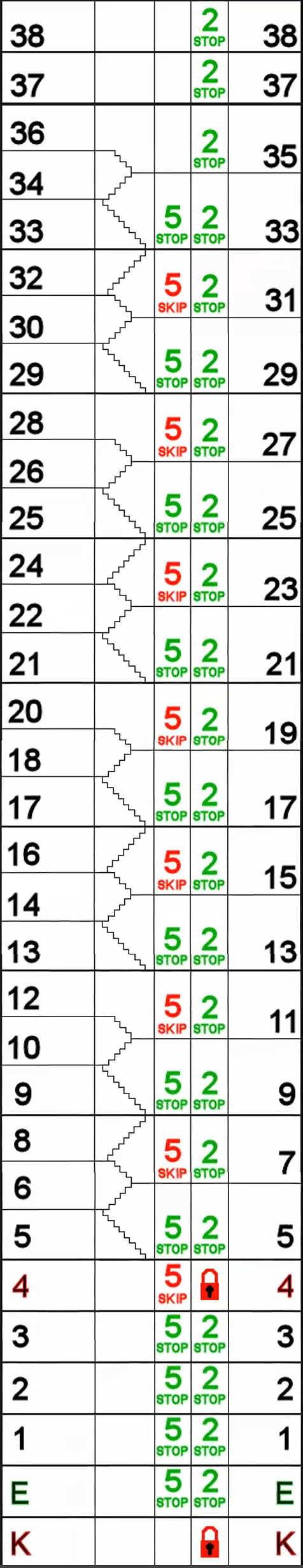
Floor, elevators and stairs plan of the AfE tower

Planning and construction of AfE-Turm began in the early 1960s. The building became necessary in 1961, when the College of Pedagogy was incorporated into the University, and the old Bettinaschule in the Westend turned out to be inadequate, even as a provisional arrangement. The building inherently lacked the required functionality.

The north side of the tower housed the library of the social sciences, as well as seminar rooms with 1.5 times the floor height. The south side consisted of offices only a single floor high, which required an intricate system of staircases and split-levels between the two halves, considerably complicating orientation. After the construction, a cafeteria was established in the top floor, but was closed for lack of popularity. This floor was not accessible with all lifts, and was considered a hard-to-find secret due to the good view in all directions. The student-managed TuCa (Tower Café) on the ground floor was cleared by the police at the behest of the university administration, in order to open a café managed by the Studentenwerk, named the C'AfE. Since the beginning of 2007, the TuCa sat "in exile" on the fifth floor.

The tower was designed for 2,500 students. However, the building was occupied since its opening with a multiple of that. As a result, the seven elevators had waiting periods of up to fifteen minutes.

In August 2005, a university employee was killed in an accident when her lift got stuck between two floors, and she attempted to exit. It is still controversial whether this accident was a result of human error or a series of almost daily failures of the building's technology. Since the tower was to be demolished within the next few years, the university administration had to avoid all non-essential renovation work. At intervals, however, façade repairs had to be carried out.

The tower was a popular destination for student protests, as it could be completely sealed off with relatively few helpers, in contrast to most other buildings of the university. The dramatically worsened study conditions within the tower in recent years were another motive. The resulting tower blockades were an integral part of periodic protests at the Goethe University for many years.

== Demolition ==
The departments of Social Sciences and Education moved to the University's Westend Campus in Spring 2013. The building had been empty since the end of April 2013. The gradual demolition of the tower commenced in July 2013 and was finalized at the end of January 2014, when authorities gave the green light for its implosion. The implosion occurred on 2 February 2014, at 10:04 CET. It is the tallest building in Europe ever to be demolished by implosion.

== Subsequent redevelopment ==
In the following years, the asset manager Commerz Real and the project development company Groß & Partner acquired the property in sections and partly in a joint venture. The Senckenberg-Quarter was built on the site by 2023 according to plans by the Cyrus Moser architectural firm. Its components are the high-rise buildings One Forty West and Senckenberg Tower, the six-story office building 21 West, and a daycare center.

== See also ==
- List of tallest buildings in Frankfurt
- List of tallest buildings in Germany
- List of tallest voluntarily demolished buildings
- List of Brutalist structures
