= Ocean Tower =

Unfinished building in South Padre Island, Texas, imploded in 2009

Ocean Tower SPI
- Leaning Tower of South Padre
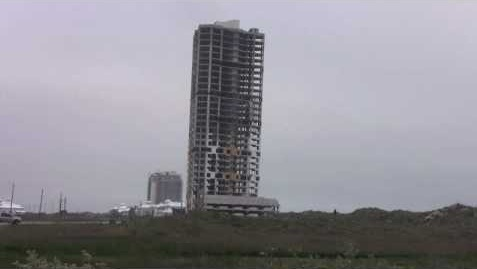
- Interactive map of the Ocean Tower SPI area

General information
- Type: Residential
- Architectural style: Postmodernism
- Location: South Padre Island, Texas, United States, Padre Boulevard across SPI Convention Center
- Coordinates: 26.146459°N 97.171141°W
- Construction started: February 2, 2006
- Construction stopped: May 2008
- Demolished: December 13, 2009

Height
- Height: 115.51 metres (379.0 ft)

Technical details
- Structural system: 401 16-inch diameter auger-cast piles
- Material: Reinforced concrete
- Floor count: 31
- Lifts/elevators: 4

Design and construction
- Architects: Metropolitan Capital Advisors, Ltd.
- Architecture firm: Walker & Perez, Inc.
- Developer: Coastal Constructors Southwest Ventures
- Engineer: Raba Kistner, Inc.
- Structural engineer: Datum Engineers
- Civil engineer: Raba‑Kistner Consulting Engineers
- Other designers: Ocean Tower LP.
- Quantity surveyor: Metropolitan Capital Advisors, Ltd.
- Main contractor: Zachary Construction
- Known for: Tallest Reinforced Concrete Demolition

Renovating team
- Main contractor: Controlled Demolition, Inc.
- Awards: Tallest Demolition of Structural Concrete

Other information
- Parking: Garage

Ocean Tower SPI was an unfinished, 31-story residential skyscraper in South Padre Island, Cameron County, Texas, United States, that was imploded when it was deemed unsafe to remain standing. Construction was halted in May 2008 when cracks formed in the building's supporting columns, and investigations revealed that the core of the skyscraper had sunk by more than 14 inches (360 mm). Though the developers initially vowed to fix the problem, studies discovered that repairs would have been too expensive, and plans for its demolition were announced in September 2009. At the time of its controlled implosion in December 2009 the building weighed 55,000 short tons (50,000 t), and it was the tallest reinforced concrete structure to be demolished in that way. It was nicknamed "Faulty Towers" and "The Leaning Tower of South Padre Island".

== Plans ==
The Ocean Tower project was developed by Coastal Constructors Southwest Ventures, a subsidiary of Zachry Construction. It was designed as a 31-story luxury apartment building featuring 147 residences, a gym, swimming pools, spa, and a media room. The podium of the building was a large parking garage with the homes beginning at 55 feet (17 m) above sea level. The completed building would stand 445 feet (136 m) tall and be one of the tallest structures in the Rio Grande Valley. The building was designed to withstand extreme winds with three massively reinforced core walls. Units were to retail for $2 million.

== Construction ==
After a month of structural testing the construction of Ocean Tower began on April 5, 2006. It continued for two years with much of the main structure completed until differential settlement saw parts of the building sink by over 14 inches (360 mm). Pier supports in the shifting clay more than 100 feet (30 m) underground began buckling, stressing beams and columns, causing cracking, spalling, and breaking, eventually causing the building to lean towards the northwest corner, cracking the wall of the adjacent garage, which abuts the tower. The official explanation was that the parking garage and the tower were mistakenly built connected, forcing the weight down upon the garage instead of on the tower's core. The use of expandable clay, which compresses when weight is applied to it, compounded the issue and allowed the parking garage to remain relatively unsettled compared to the tower itself. Preliminary evaluation showed that the tower's core had sunk 14 to 16 inches (360 to 410 mm), while the attached parking lot had shifted less than half that distance.

Construction was halted in the summer of 2008. Soon after, the building became known as the "leaning tower of South Padre" and was viewed as a looming eyesore.

In a letter dated July 2, 2008 the developers informed buyers about the problems that they had encountered. They reassured them "Your unit will be delivered, and the building will be stronger and safer than ever", stating that completion of the construction would be delayed by "6 to 9 months". The proposed fixes would have the garage beams separated from the tower, and new columns to be placed under the beams. Once the columns had been fully braced, then garage beams would be cut away and the foundation would be repaired. By this time more than 100 of the condominiums had been sold.

On November 4, 2008, after several engineering studies had discovered that the work needed to fix the building would prevent the project from becoming economically viable, the development was officially cancelled and purchasers were released from their unit purchase agreements.

== Demolition ==
Any materials that could be recycled or resold, including fixtures and fittings, steel, flooring, and windows, were removed from the building before demolition. The nearby Texas Park Road 100 was closed on safety grounds just before the building was set to be razed. At 9am on December 13, 2009, the building was imploded by Controlled Demolition, Inc. By the time it fell the building weighed 55,000 short tons (50,000 t) and is reported to be the tallest and largest reinforced concrete structure ever imploded.

The implosion was watched by a large crowd, many of whom stayed in local hotels and visited restaurants in the area. Island spokesman Dan Quandt described the event as "a very good short-term economic boost for South Padre Island".

== Lawsuit ==
The developers have filed a $125 million lawsuit against geotechnical engineering firm Raba-Kistner Engineering and Consulting of San Antonio.

== See also ==
- List of tallest voluntarily demolished buildings
