= Bettinaschule =

Location
- Feuerbachstraße 37–47; Westend-Süd; Frankfurt, Hesse, 60325; Germany
- Coordinates: 50°7′0.99″N 8°39′46.88″E

Information
- School type: Public Gymnasium
- Founded: 1855
- School number: 5106
- Head of school: Elke Schinkel
- Grades: 5–13
- Gender: Coeducational
- Sixth form students: c. 304 (grade 11–13)
- Website: www.bettinaschule-frankfurt.de
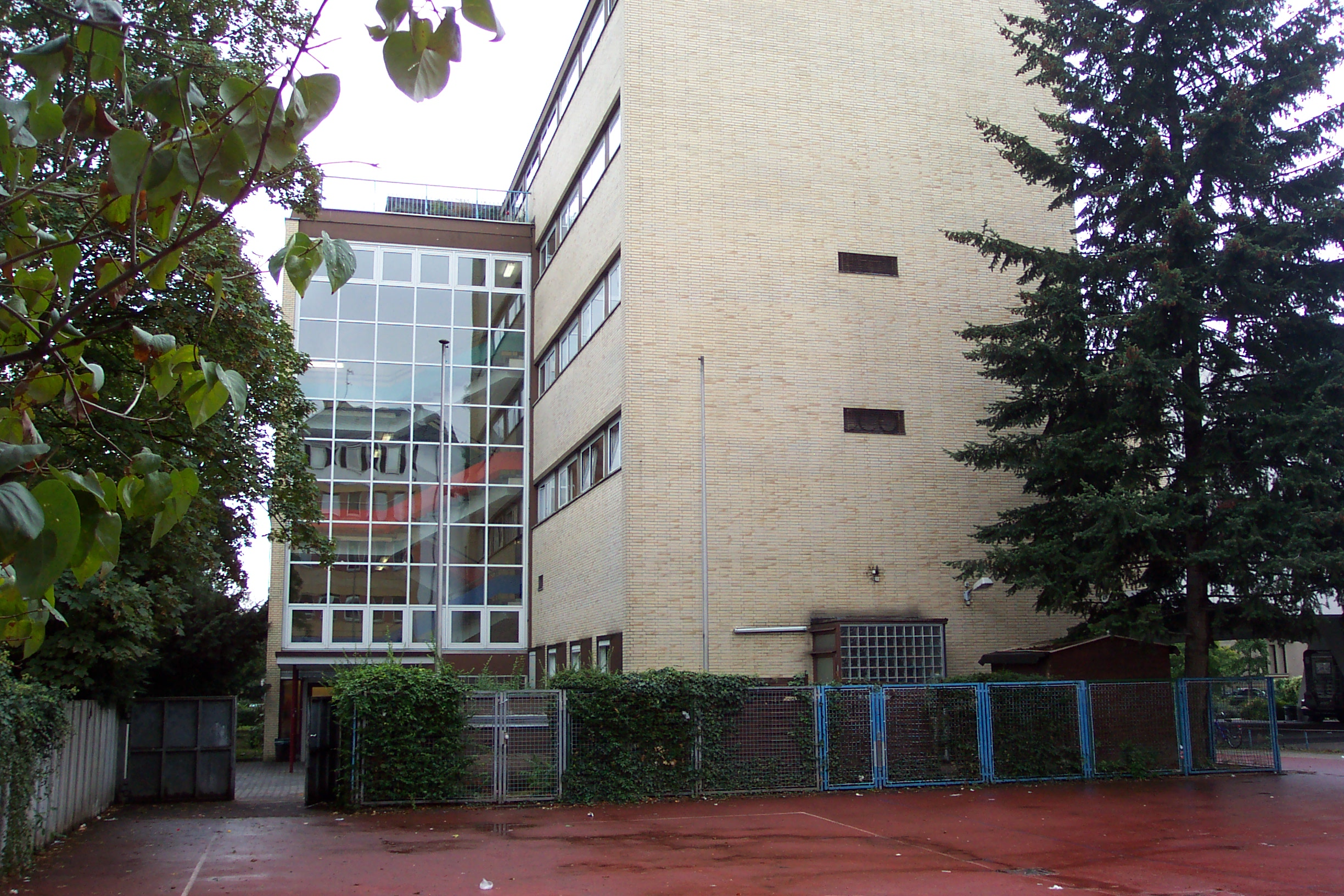

The Bettinaschule (English: Bettina School) is a Gymnasium in Westend, Frankfurt am Main, Germany.

The eponym is Bettina von Arnim (1785–1859). The school has approximately 71 teachers and 1,028 students.

== Notable alumni ==
- Omid Nouripour (born 1975), Persian-German politician, a member of Green party in Germany and a member of the German parliament (Bundestag).
- Sarah Sorge (born 1969), German politician
