= Young Street Terraces =

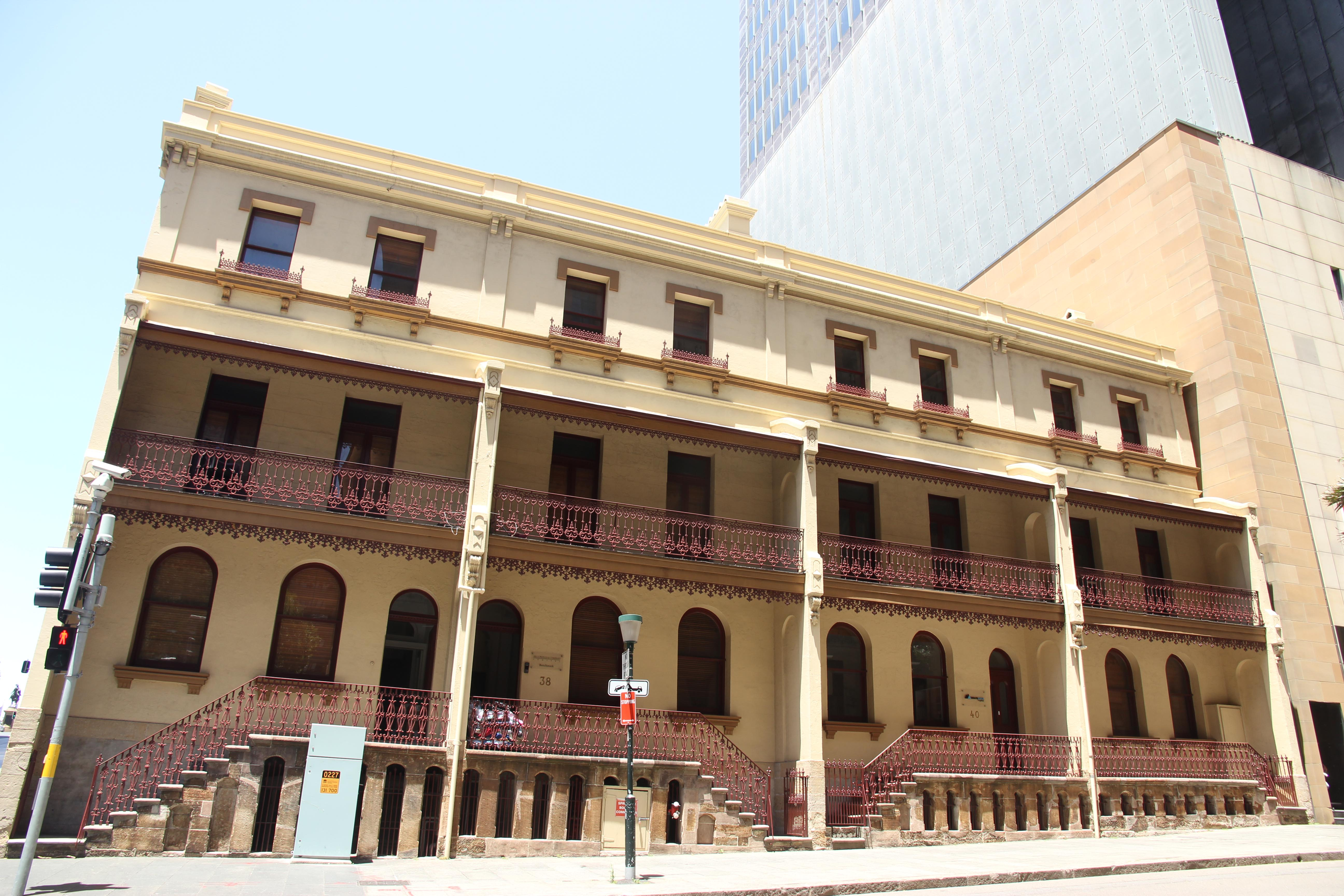
- The terrace houses pictured in 2019

- Location within Sydney Location within Australia
- 33.8636°S 151.2112°E
- Location: 36-42 Young Street, Sydney central business district, City of Sydney, New South Wales, Australia

History
- Built: 1874–1875

Site notes
- Architect: Joseph Paul Walker (attrib.)
- Architectural style: Victorian Filigree

New South Wales Heritage Register
- Official name: Young Street Terraces; Sydney Hospital Nurses Annex; Nurses quarters; Government Offices
- Type: State heritage (built)
- Designated: 2 April 1999
- Reference no.: 974
- Type: Terrace
- Category: Government and Administration
- Builders: Joseph Paul Walker

The Young Street Terraces are heritage-listed former government offices and nurses' quarters, and now offices, at 36-42 Young Street, in the Sydney central business district in New South Wales, Australia. Its design and construction was attributed to Joseph Paul Walker and built from 1874 to 1875. It is also known as the Sydney Hospital Nurses Annex; Nurses quarters; or Government Offices. It was added to the New South Wales State Heritage Register on 2 April 1999.

== History ==
The land occupied by Young Street Terraces was originally part of the grounds of First Government House. In 1851, the land was granted to Municipal Council of Sydney which subsequently subdivided it for sale. Lots 1 and 2 were sold to O. J. Caraher in 1866, then on to W. Andrews in 1874, and to builder J. W. Walker later that year. Walker built the terrace houses c. 1874-5 and leased them as offices to the Mining Board (Nos. 36, 38 and 40) and the Department of Lands (No. 42). Between 1876–1881, the Department of Mines opened a mining museum in two rooms on the ground floor of No. 38. In 1881, Walker sold the property to J. Robertson. In 1884 the government used the property for Public Works Department offices. Various government departments continued to occupy the terraces until 1936. Between 1937–1982 the terraces provided temporary accommodation for nurses from Sydney Hospital, with the offices converted into living quarters. The rear of the site was converted into a car park in 1961. In 1982, the Sydney Hospital relinquished the building which remained unoccupied after the completion of the Museum of Sydney and associated conservation work on the terraces. In late 1997, the building was refurbished by the Department of Public Works and Services to provide office accommodation for the Sydney Festival and the NSW Historic Houses Trust. The property title was transferred to the Minister for the Arts in 1998.

== Description ==
The Young Street Terraces are in the northern part of Sydney's central business district (CBD). The terraces are in the Victorian filigree architectural style. The building consists of four units, each of three storeys and a basement, interconnected on all floors. The building is generally constructed of rendered brick with timber floors, while the basements are of sandstone and soft brick with concrete floors. The roof is clad in colourbond corrugated steel. The verandah and balcony balustrades are of cast iron. Internally, the major walls are either of rendered masonry or plaster and lath on stud. The interior detail is largely intact in terms of skirting, architraves, doors, windows and their furniture, staircases and skirtings, architraves, doors, windows and their furniture, staircases and fireplaces, and the timber surrounds with fluted pilasters on the first floor. Some of the original doors have been reused elsewhere in the building.

=== Modifications and dates ===
Some of the unsympathetic additions to the original building e.g., at the rear of the building some bath and kitchen facilities have since been removed. The building has been refurbished and the services upgraded to provide modern office amenities and services to the occupants.

== Heritage listing ==
As at 8 February 2001, Young Street Terraces are the only buildings that still remain in situ, demonstrating the latter post-Government House phase of development on the First Government House site. They were part of the early development of this area which became the leading government administrative precinct later in the 19th century. Their relative simplicity contrasts with the more opulent public administrative buildings built at the end of the 19th century showing the change in attitude to public buildings. Together with the Phillip Street Terraces, they represent an essentially residential form of building which is now rare in the Sydney CBD. The various adaptations made to the building have been minor and the intention of the residences is still obvious. Young Street Terraces was listed on the New South Wales State Heritage Register on 2 April 1999.

== See also ==
- Australian residential architectural styles
