= Joseph Lowthian Hudson =

American businessman

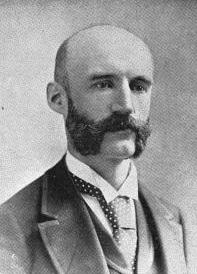
- J. L. Hudson, c. 1891
- Born: Joseph Lowthian Hudson; October 17, 1846; Newcastle, England
- Died: July 5, 1912 (aged 65); Worthing, England
- Occupation: Merchant
- Known for: The J.L. Hudson Company Hudson Motor Car Company
- Family: Eleanor Lowthian Clay (niece)

Joseph Lowthian Hudson (October 17, 1846 – July 5, 1912), a.k.a. J. L. Hudson, was the merchant who founded the Hudson's department store in Detroit, Michigan. Hudson also supplied the seed capital for the establishment, in 1909, of Roy D. Chapin's automotive venture, which Chapin named the Hudson Motor Car Company in honor of J. L. Hudson.

== Biography ==
Hudson was born in Newcastle upon Tyne, England, and immigrated with his family to Hamilton, Canada West, when he was nine; by the age of fourteen he and members of his family were residing in Michigan. His brother William moved to Buffalo, New York, in 1896, to operate a branch of the Hudson's store until his death in 1928.

While Hudson began his career in merchandising with family members and other outside partners, he founded what would provide the basis for Hudson's Department Stores in 1881 inside a shop at the Detroit Opera House. Hudson at first focused on men's and boy's wear. The retail operation succeeded by setting low prices and a return policy that favored the customer. As business volume grew, Hudson added sales professionals and additional lines of goods, including women's clothing and housewares. Hudson incorporated his venture in 1891 as the J.L. Hudson Company.

In addition to providing the seed capital for Hudson Motor Car Company, J.L. Hudson was also involved the American Vapor Stove Company, Dime Savings Bank of Detroit, American Exchange National Bank, the Detroit City Gas Company, and the Third National Bank of Detroit. When the Third National Bank collapsed in the financial panic of 1893, Hudson felt personally liable for the failure and paid from his personal accounts an amount equal to the balances of record held by each account holder. The move cost Hudson $265,000, however, the good will that it showed also paid Hudson dividends in the form of increasing market share for his businesses. Hudson was also active in civic causes in the greater Detroit area.

Hudson never married, but toward the end of his life, he was engaged to Eida Caroline Schmidt, though he died from a lung problem while on a business trip on July 5, 1912, before they could marry. Some sources list his place of death as Worthing, England, while some newspaper accounts list the place of death as Paris. His remains were returned to New York City aboard the RMS Oceanic. From New York, Hudson's casket was carried to Detroit by train accompanied by members of his family. Services were held July 19, 1912, at Central Methodist Church before interment at Woodlawn Cemetery.

According to biographer Edward L. Lack Jr., Hudson left no personal papers, and the details outside of his public life are few and mostly unknown.

Hudson's niece Eleanor Lowthian Clay (1896–1976) was the wife of Edsel Ford.
