= Phillip Street Terraces =

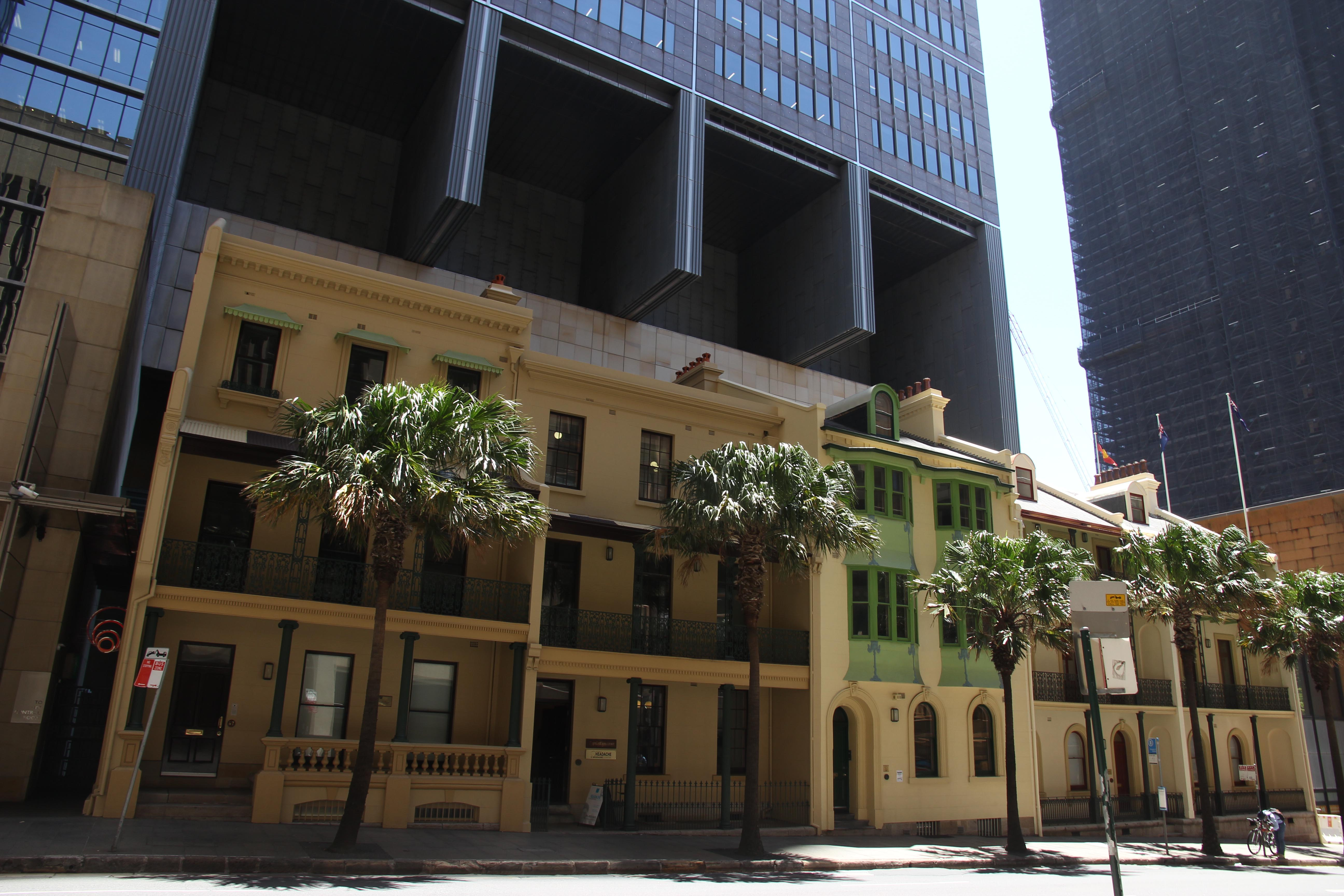
- The terrace houses, pictured in 2019. Part of the Governor Phillip Tower is pictured above the terraces.

- Location within Sydney Location within Australia
- 33.8640°S 151.2115°E
- Location: 39-47 Phillip Street, Sydney central business district, City of Sydney, New South Wales, Australia

New South Wales Heritage Register
- Official name: Phillip Street Terraces
- Type: State heritage (built)
- Designated: 2 April 1999
- Reference no.: 621
- Type: Terrace
- Category: Residential buildings (private)

The Phillip Street Terraces are heritage-listed terrace houses and now mixed commercial buildings, offices and restaurant located at 39-47 Phillip Street in the Sydney central business district, in the City of Sydney local government area of New South Wales, Australia. The property is owned by the trustees of the New South Wales Government-owned superannuation fund. It was added to the New South Wales State Heritage Register on 2 April 1999.

== History ==
The Heritage Council Restoration Steering (HC RS) Committee considered the prospect of letting the buildings on the basis of a combined residential/commercial use for a suitable lease period, with the cost of restoration work to be borne by the tenants.

In response to a press advertisement the HC RS Committee received 67 expressions of interest in restoring and leasing the terraces, covering a wide variety of uses. Legal action was taken to evict squatters in the buildings. A security fence was erected at the rear of the buildings but a detailed estimate of minor repairs needed could not be made due to difficulties in gaining access due to the squatters.

== Heritage listing ==
The Phillip Street Terraces was listed on the New South Wales State Heritage Register on 2 April 1999.

== See also ==
- Australian residential architectural styles
- Young Street Terraces
