= Edifício São Vito =

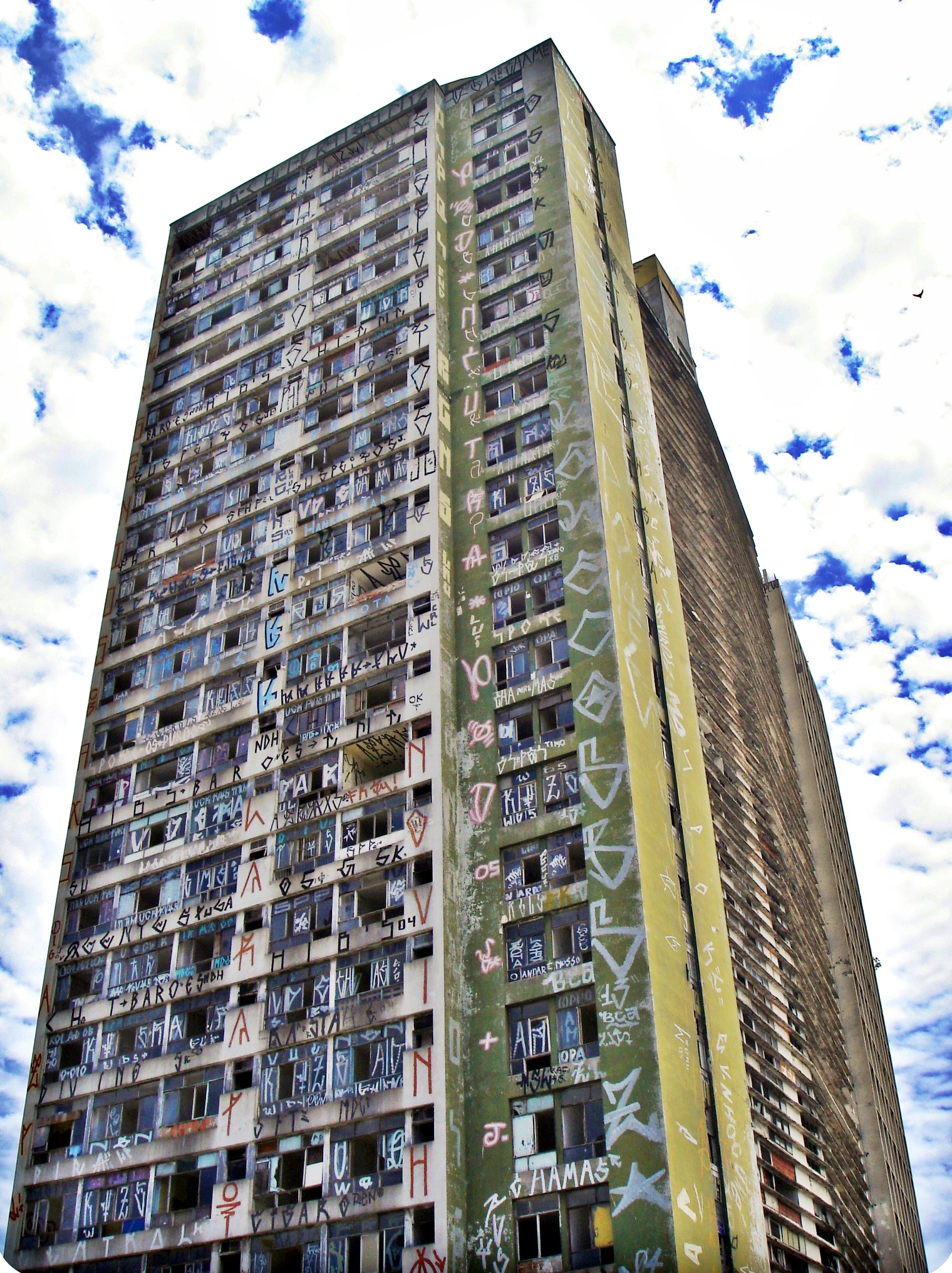
- Edifício São Vito in 2006

- Location within São Paulo Location within Brazil
- Alternative names: Treme-Treme; (Shiver-Shiver)

General information
- Status: Demolished
- Type: Residential
- Architectural style: Modernism
- Location: São Paulo, Brazil
- Coordinates: 23°32′33″S 46°37′42″W
- Construction started: 1954
- Completed: 1959
- Demolished: 2011

Height
- Height: 112 metres (367 ft)

Technical details
- Floor count: 27

Design and construction
- Architect: Aron Kogan
- Architecture firm: Zarzur & Kogan

Edifício São Vito, popularly known as Treme-Treme (literally "Shiver-Shiver"), was a 112-metre (367 ft), 27-story former residential building, located in São Paulo, Brazil, finished in 1959. Throughout its existence, the building became deteriorated and earned a reputation of São Paulo's biggest vertical cortiço (slum). The city expropriated and evacuated the building in 2004.

== History ==
=== Construction and first decades ===
The building was designed by Aron Kogan and built by the company Zarzur & Kogan, also responsible for the design and building of Brazil's tallest building, Mirante do Vale, located less than a mile west of São Vito. Construction began in 1954 and ended five years later. The original lot was 784.17 m^{2} (8,440.7 sq ft). The architecture of the building was inspired by modernism and it was first conceived as a solution for popular housing, although it also had space for commercial establishments. It was aimed at liberal professionals, immigrants, travelers and people who arrived at the city and had nowhere else to go. The building was made of reinforced concrete with horizontal brise soleils. Three elevators originally served it. The top floor was an open 800 m^{2} (8,600 sq ft) area, which was used for events in the 1960s. The internal corridors were 80 cm (31 in) wide and the internal staircases, 1.20 metres (3.9 ft). Originally, the building had 624 apartments (24 in every floor), each measuring 28 m^{2} (300 sq ft).

=== Deterioration ===
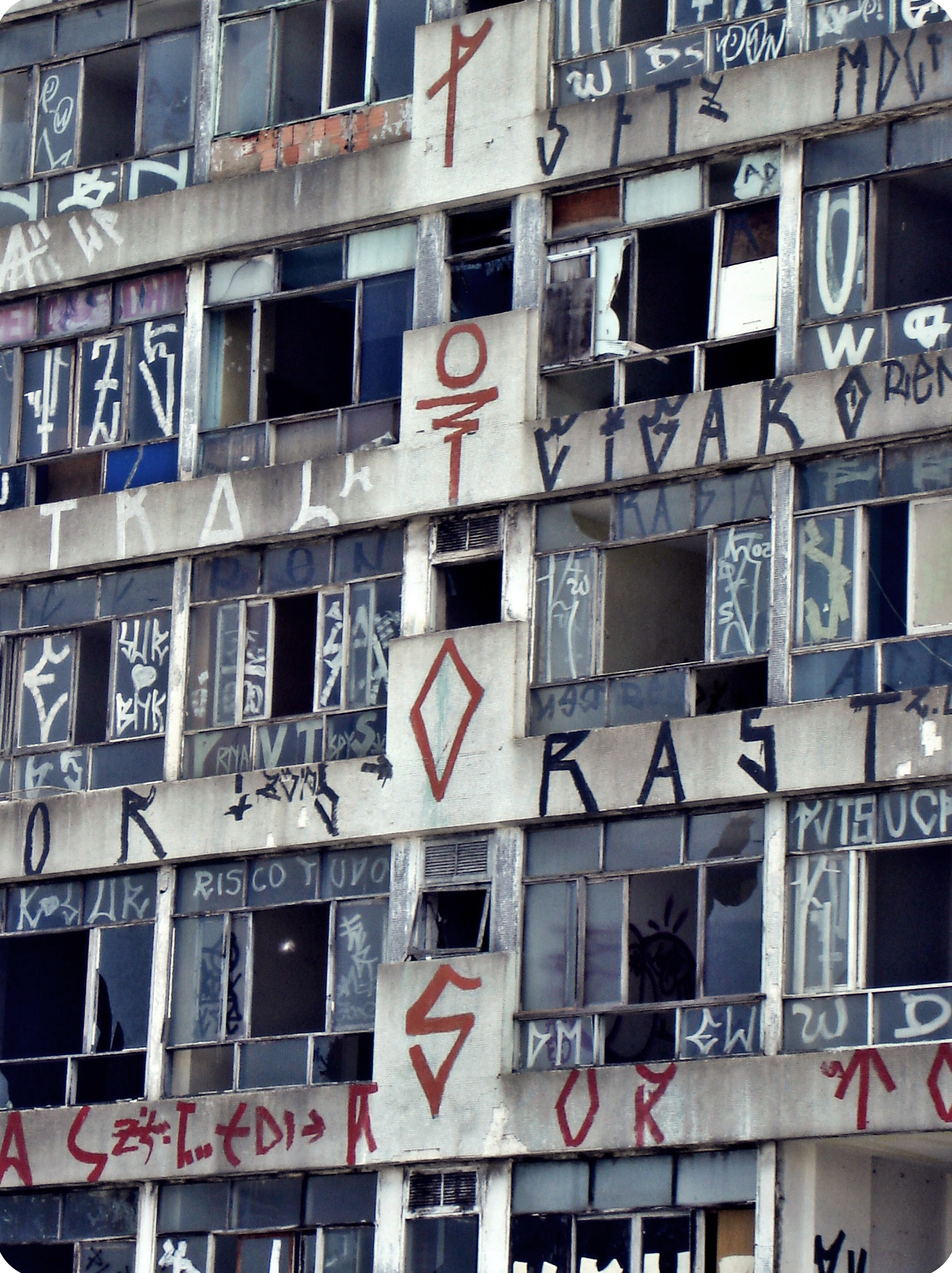
São Vito windows

In 1985, the magazine Veja em São Paulo wrote that the building was "perhaps, the biggest concentration of people of the city, (with) three thousand inhabitants, mostly low-paid and informal workers and prostitutes". In a 2009 article, the magazine Época stated that the building started to deteriorate in the 1980s because of the population's homogeneous poverty, differently from similar buildings such as Edifício Copan, which attracted middle-class families. The deterioration was reinforced as apartments started to be split into two, and electricity started to be obtained illegally (80% of the electricity of the building was illegally supplied as of 2002). Another contributing factor was the suspension of waste services – rubbish was then simply thrown out of the windows, with dirty water and food. Inhabitants of the building could use the water from two artesian aquifers until 1982, when the Tamanduateí River flooded and polluted the water. Sabesp was designated as the company responsible for supplying water, at greater cost. Only one of the three elevators was still working in 2002, but it could only reach the 15th floor out of 27, generating half-hour queues of inhabitants during rush hour periods.

By that time, the building had been nicknamed "Balança, mas não Cai" (It Sways But it Doesn't Fall) and "Treme-Treme" (Shiver-Shiver). To get access to the building, one must either be allowed in by someone who lives there or hold credibility among other inhabitants, or use police force. Robbery among the local population was common. Pieces of clothing left hanging to dry were the most stolen objects. Jânio Quadros, at that time mayor of São Paulo, was the first to order the destruction of the building, although it was not done. Violence inside São Vito slowly expelled people from it. In 2002, there were 150 abandoned apartments. At that time, there were plans to change the building's name to Bulevar Palace. 65% of the apartments had mortgages in arrears in 2002. More people started not to pay their bills when Marta Suplicy announced the demolition of the building in 2003, again with no practical results.

=== Expropriation and demolition ===
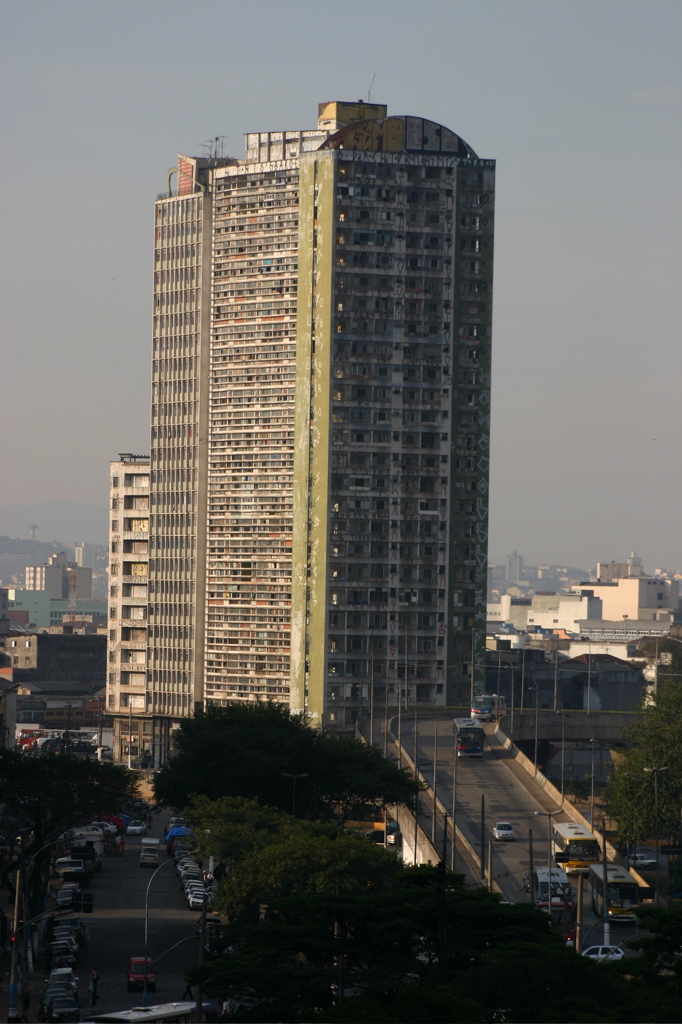
São Vito and Mercúrio buildings, with Diário Popular bridge to the right. Both were destroyed in order to revitalize the area.

The São Paulo city hall expropriated the building in 2004, and until 25 June of that year, people started vacating the building. The last 140 families vacated on the very last day. To each expelled family, the government offered a monthly stipend of R$300 (some US$150) for 36 months. Originally, the building was supposed to be renovated, a project that would cost $6.2 million, in 2002, so that the apartments could be re-sold to former owners mainly.

A feasibility study, requested in 2005 by Suplicy's successor, José Serra, concluded that every apartment would cost more than the highest costs of the Caixa Econômica Federal's program of public housing. Caixa's program also required the surrounding areas to be "recovered and attractive". There were also projects to turn the building into an hotel, a library or a concentration of municipal secretaries, but all of them were declined.

Manual demolition was viewed as the best option, so as to not affect the municipal market of São Paulo, located a few meters west. Mercúrio building, built near São Vito, was only totally emptied in 2009 and is set to be demolished as well. Apart from both buildings, other structures started to be brought down in June 2010.

The demolition, however, was not completed in 2006, which was the deadline proposed by city hall. The demolition was challenged by 59 owners.

The Public Defense of the State of São Paulo believed the buildings should be renovated and allocated to poor families, since they were located in a zone of social interest, though the price of the apartments in an area like the city center would be high. A local judge ordered the demolition not to take place, until the merits of the action were judged. The companies responsible for bringing the building down were hired in April 2010, awaiting only the end of the law processes.

Currently, the intention is to build a 5,400 m^{2} (1.3-acre) square where the buildings stand. The square is supposed to be part of Dom Pedro II Park, although it has also been suggested that a day care or a garage should be built. Local merchants prefer the garage instead of the square, claiming that the garage would be used by visitors of the Municipal Market.

Through the last decades, the building further deteriorated. Most of the windows were broken and the external walls were covered with graffiti. Locals claimed the building was frequented by crack addicts.

Edifício São Vito and its neighbor Mercúrio were demolished in 2011.
