= List of demolished hotels in New York City =

Over time, many hotels in New York City have been demolished. This list tries to gather them.

== The List ==
Image	Name	Date built	Date of demolition	Address	Comment
	Belmont Hotel (I)	1908	1939		Not confuse with Belmont Hotel (Belmont, New York) and Belmont Plaza Hotel (Hotel Montclair, W New York).
	Holland House	1892	?		
	Hotel Margaret	1889	1980		
	Half Moon Hotel	1927	1995		
	Hotel Piccadilly	1928	1982		
	YWCA (610 Lexington Ave)	1915	2007		
	Sheraton Russell Hotel	1923	2006		
	The Commodore Hotel	1919	completely transformed 1980		This building still exists but was completely gutted and cleverly reskinned in the 80s and is now unrecognizable. Similar to the Pennsylvania Hotel, it was built to service the adjacent large railway station (Grand Central). Steel frame, masonry cladding.
	Park Avenue Hotel	1878	1927		
	New York Biltmore Hotel	1913	1981		
	Albemarle Hotel	1860	1910s		
	Dauphin Hotel	1929	1964		
	Howard Hotel	1840	1864		
	Lovejoy's Hotel	1830s	1889		
	Metropolitan Hotel	1852	1895		
	Windsor Hotel	1873	1899		
	Hotel Victoria	1877	1914	entire block on 27th Street, Broadway and Fifth Avenue	not confuse with The New Hotel Victoria
	(old) San Remo Hotel	1891	1929		not confuse with The San Remo
	Hotel Navarra	1900	1930		
	Hotel Nevada	?	1974		
	(old) Hotel Majestic (1894–1929)	1894	c. 1929		not confuse with The Majestic (New York City)
	Hotel Chesterfield	1920s	1960s		
	Hotel Iroquois	1889	1940		not confuse with The Iroquois New York
	Astor House	1836	1913–1926	corner of Broadway and Vesey Street	
	Dauphin Hotel	1929	1958	west block front of Broadway between 66th Street and 67th Street	
	Drake Hotel	1926	2006	440 Park Avenue	
	Fifth Avenue Hotel	1859	1908	200 Fifth Avenue	
	Hotel Astor	1905–1910	1967	West 44th Street	
	Hotel Claridge	1910–1911	1970	southeast corner of Broadway and 44th Street	
	Hotel Lafayette	1902	1949	26th Street near Madison Square Park	
	Hotel New Netherland	1892–1893	1927	northeast corner of Fifth Avenue and 59th Street	
	Hotel Manhattan	1895–1896	1961	northwest corner of Madison Avenue and 42nd Street	
	Marriott World Trade Center	1979–1981	2001	3 World Trade Center	
	Murray Hill Hotel	1884	1947	112 Park Avenue	
	Pabst Hotel	1898–1899	1902	north side of 42nd Street	
	Ritz-Carlton Hotel	1911	1951	46th Street and Madison Avenue	
	Rockaway Beach Hotel	1870s	1889	110th Street to Beach 116th Street	
	(old) Savoy Hotel	1890	1925		
	Savoy-Plaza Hotel	1927	1965	Fifth Avenue and East 59th Street	
	Sinclair House (Manhattan hotel)	1787	1908	754 Broadway	
	St. Nicholas Hotel	1853	c. 1884		
	Waldorf–Astoria (1893–1929)	1893–1897	1929	corner of Fifth Avenue and 33rd Street	

== Planned buildings ==
- New York’s Hotel Commonwealth (1918)
- New Murray Hill Hotel
- New Hotel Manhattan

== Links ==
- Old New York in Postcards #2 – Old Hotels of New York City

== Related pages ==
- List of demolished buildings and structures in New York City
