= List of former hotels in Manhattan =

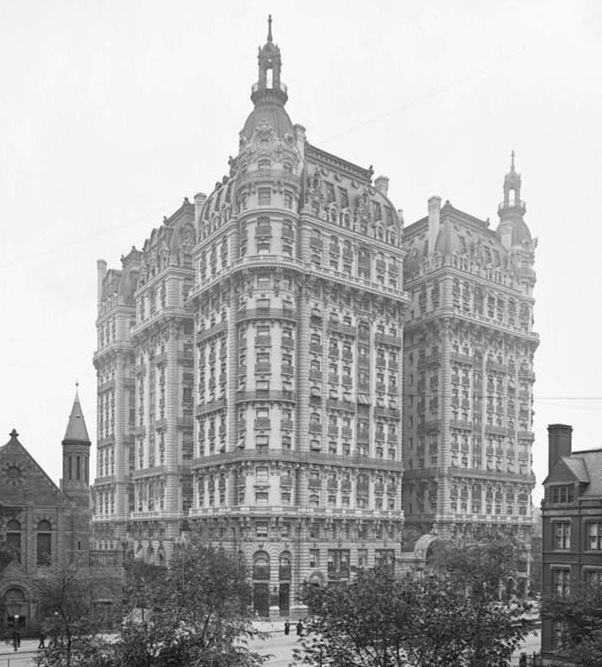
The Ansonia Hotel on Broadway at the intersection with Amsterdam Avenue (1905)

This is an incomplete list of former hotels in Manhattan, New York City.

== Former hotels in Manhattan ==
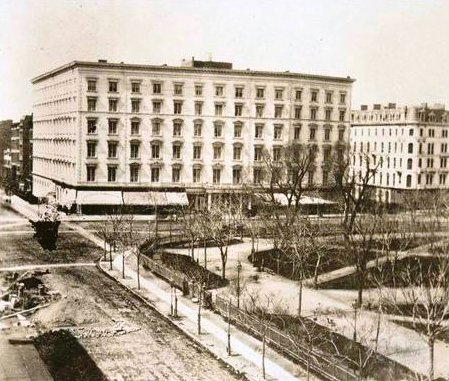
The Fifth Avenue Hotel (1860)

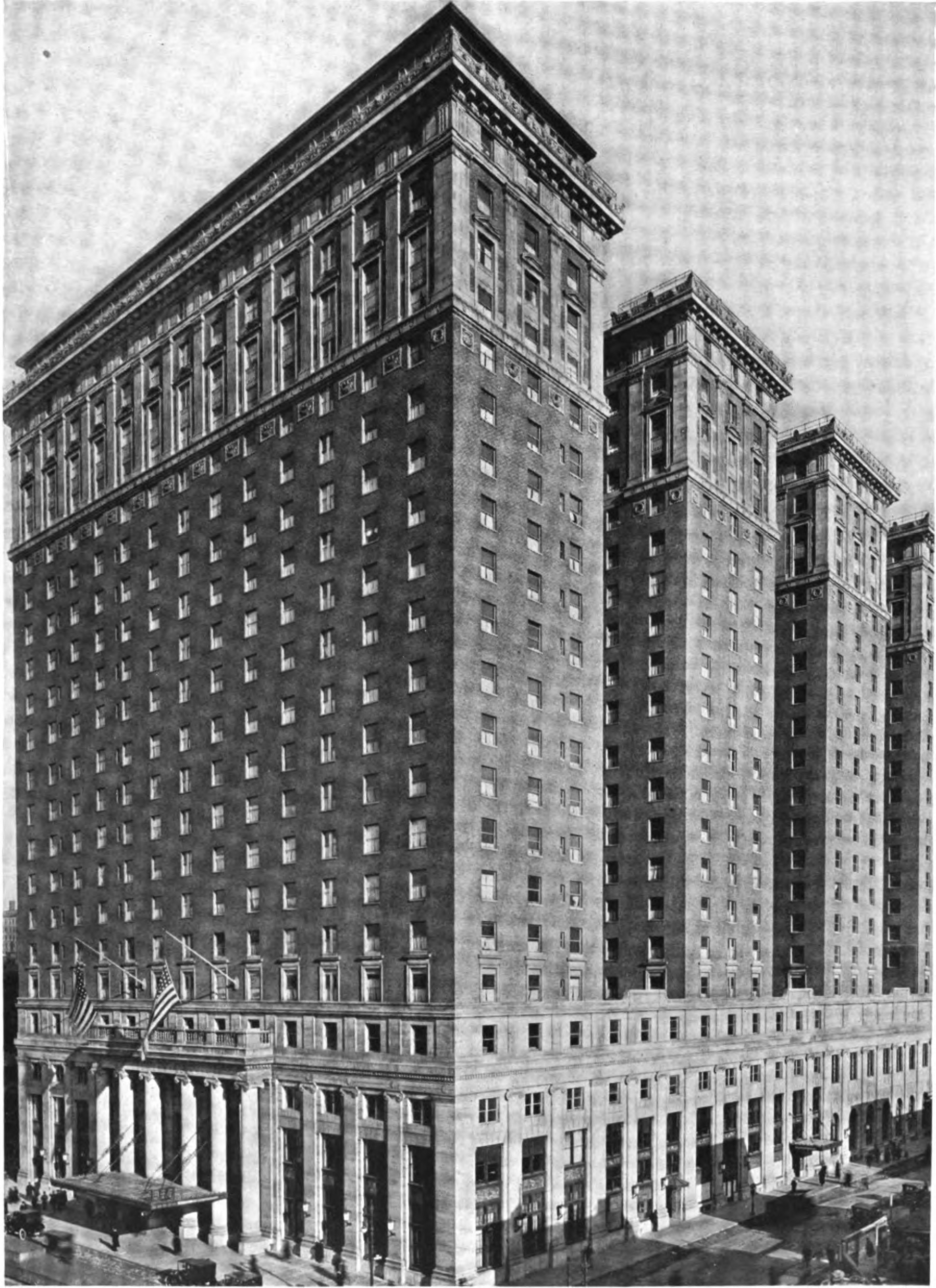
Hotel Pennsylvania, once the largest hotel in the world, at 401 Seventh Avenue ((c. 1919)

- 995 Fifth Avenue
- Albemarle Hotel
- The Ansonia
- Astor House
- Barbizon-Plaza Hotel
- Belmont Hotel
- The Briarcliffe
- City Hotel
- Dauphin Hotel
- DoubleTree by Hilton Hotel Metropolitan New York City
- Drake Hotel
- Endicott Hotel
- Fifth Avenue Hotel
- George Washington Hotel
- Grand Central Hotel
- Grand Hotel
- Holland House
- Hotel Astor
- Hotel Carter
- Hotel Claridge
- Hotel Kenmore Hall
- Hotel Lafayette
- Hotel Manhattan
- Hotel Marguery
- Hotel McAlpin
- Hotel Metropole
- Hotel New Netherland
- Hotel Pennsylvania
- Hotel Pierrepont
- Hotel St. Moritz
- Hotel Theresa
- Hotel Victoria
- Howard Hotel
- Lovejoy's Hotel
- Metropolitan Hotel
- Morgans Hotel
- Murray Hill Hotel
- New York Biltmore Hotel
- New York Marriott East Side
- The NoMad
- Pabst Hotel
- Ritz-Carlton Hotel
- Riverside Plaza Hotel
- The Roosevelt Hotel
- Savoy-Plaza Hotel
- Sinclair House
- St. Nicholas Hotel
- Stanhope Hotel
- Marriott World Trade Center
- Vanderbilt Hotel
- Waldorf-Astoria
- Washington Hall
- Weylin Hotel
- Windsor Hotel

== See also ==
- List of hotels in New York City
- Lists of hotels – an index of hotel list articles on Wikipedia
