= Confederate Army of Manhattan =

American Civil War spy unit

The Confederate Army of Manhattan was a group of eight Southern operatives who attempted to burn New York City on or after Evacuation Day, November 25, 1864, during the final stages of the American Civil War.

In a plot orchestrated by Jacob Thompson, the operatives infiltrated Union territory by way of Canada and made their way to New York City. On Friday night, November 25, beginning around 8:45pm, the group attempted to simultaneously start fires in 19 hotels, a theater, and P. T. Barnum's American Museum. The objective was to overwhelm the city's firefighting resources by distributing the fires around the city. The hotels included the primary hotels of the day, including the 5th Ward Museum Hotel, Astor House, the Belmont Hotel, the Fifth Avenue Hotel, the Howard Hotel, La Farge House, Lovejoy's Hotel, the Metropolitan Hotel, the St. James Hotel, the St. Nicholas Hotel, the Tammany Hotel, and the United States Hotel.

Most of the fires either failed to start or were contained quickly. All the operatives escaped prosecution except Robert Cobb Kennedy, who was apprehended in January 1865 while trying to travel from Canada to the Confederate capital, Richmond, Virginia.

== History ==
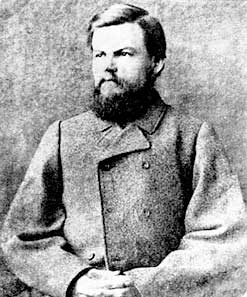
Robert Cobb Kennedy

An article from February 28, 1865 describes Kennedy as follows:

Mr. Kennedy is a man of apparently 30 years of age, with an exceedingly unprepossessing countenance. His head is well shaped, but his brow is lowering, his eyes deep sunken and his look unsteady. Evidently a keen-witted, desperate man, he combines the cunning and the enthusiasm of a fanatic, with the lack of moral principle characteristic of many Southern Hotspurs, whose former college experiences, and most recent hotel-burning plots are somewhat familiar to our readers. Kennedy is well connected at the South, is a relative, a nephew we believe, of Howell Cobb, and was educated at the expense of the United States, at West Point, where he remained two years, leaving at that partial period of study in consequence of mental or physical inability. While there he made the acquaintance of Ex. Brig. Gen. E.W. Stoughton, who courteously proffered his services as counsel for his ancient friend in his present needy hour. During Kennedy's confinement here, while awaiting trial, he made sundry foolish admissions, wrote several letters which have told against him, and in general did, either intentionally or indiscreetly, many things, which seem to have rendered his conviction almost a matter of entire certainty.

A Louisiana native and Confederate officer, Kennedy escaped from Johnson's Island Military Prison on October 4, 1864, and made his way to Canada. There, he joined with a small group of Confederate officers who had been dispatched to Canada by Confederate President Jefferson Davis to plan military raids that could be launched at the Union from politically neutral Canadian soil.

He and his fellow "incendiaries" escaped to Canada after their plan failed, and Kennedy alone was captured when he tried to slip back into the United States at Detroit. He was transported to Fort Lafayette to a military hearing chaired by General Fitz Henry Warren, while being represented by former West Point classmate Edwin Stoughton. His trial began on 17 January 1865. The trial, under Judge Advocate John A. Bolles ended on 27 February; despite Bolles' inability to present more than circumstantial evidence, or to find a witness who had observed Kennedy perform any suspicious activities, Kennedy was found guilty on all charges and sentenced to hang. Stoughton appealed to President Lincoln to commute Kennedy's sentence to life imprisonment, but the appeal was refused.

Kennedy attempted to escape on 19 March, but was foiled in the attempt and consequently spent his last days in irons. He made a confession of the attempt to the camp commander, Martin Burke, and Joe Howard Jr., of The New York Times . Kennedy's execution on 25 March 1865 marked the last execution of a Confederate operative by the United States government during the Civil War.

== In popular culture ==
- Season 1, Episodes 7–11 of the BBC America television series Copper, address the infiltration of multiple Union cities by "nests of Confederates", and plots by Confederates to burn New York City using a self-igniting liquid referred to as "Greek fire".
- The attempt to burn LaFarge House (as LaFarge Hotel) is depicted in Episode 4 of Apple TV+'s Manhunt. However, unlike real events, the perpetrator is apprehended on the spot.
- John Calvin Batchelor's 1985 novel 'American Falls' about the struggle between the Union and Confederate Secret Services deals with the conspiracy as a major arc of the plot.

== See also ==
- Confederate Secret Service
- New York in the American Civil War
- New York City in the American Civil War
- St. Nicholas Hotel (New York City)
