= City Hotel (Manhattan) =

Hotel in New York City (1794–1849)

Coordinates: 40°42′32.5″N 74°0′40.2″W

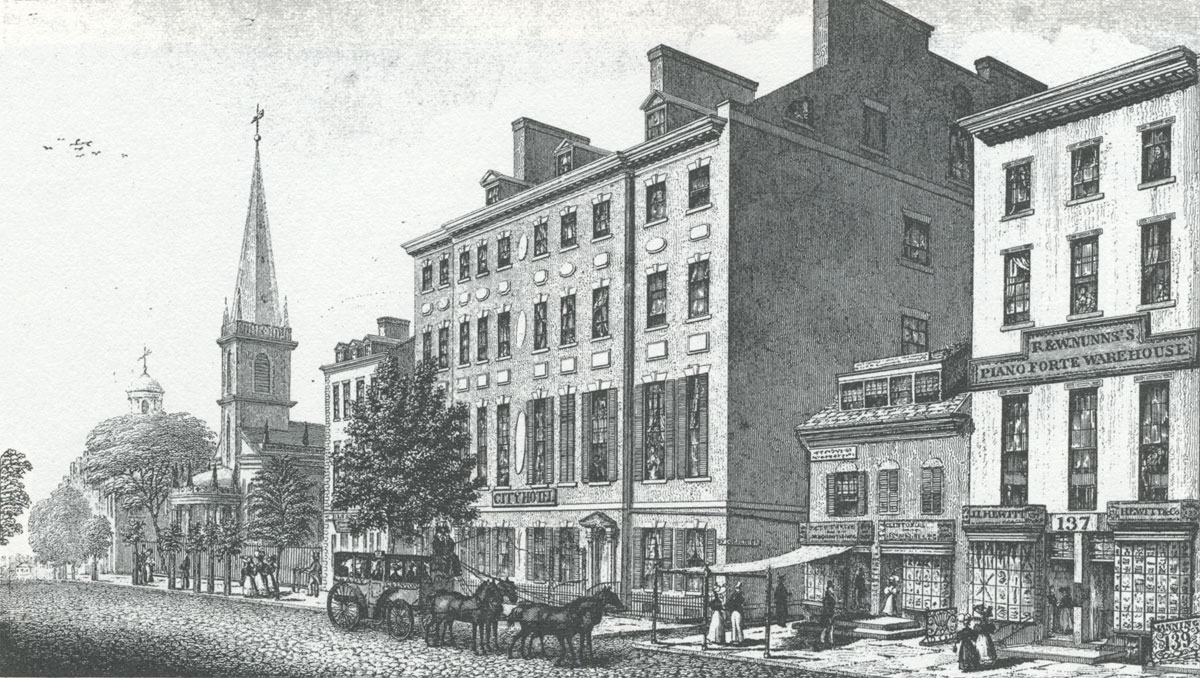
City Hotel, 1831

The City Hotel (1794–1849) stood at 123 Broadway, occupying the whole block bounded by Cedar, Temple, and Thames Streets, in today's Financial District of Manhattan, New York City. It was the first functioning hotel in the United States. Until the early 1840s it was the city's principal site for prestigious social functions and concerts. Designed by John McComb Jr., it offered not only luxurious accommodations, but also such amenities as shops, a barroom, and a coffeehouse, as well as public dining and dancing. Its five stories and 137 rooms replaced the former home of Stephen Delancey, built around 1700, which had become an inn.

An 1825 guide-book, first published in 1817, calls it "an immense building, 5 stories in height, [which] contains 78 rooms of various dimensions, fitted up and furnished in a tasteful, elegant and convenient manner … the proprietor of this Hotel makes it his constant study to provide the best of every thing to his visitors." An 1828 expanded edition states:

City Hotel, [operated] by Chester Jennings, is the chief place of resort, and … the loftiest edifice of that kind in the city, containing more than one hundred large and small parlours and lodging-rooms, besides the City Assembly Room, chiefly used for Concerts and Balls. The rooms appropriated for private families, parlours, and dining rooms are superbly fitted up, and constantly occupied by respectable strangers. Extensive additions have recently been made to this establishment. The principal Book stores and Libraries are in the vicinity. Prices, over two days, $1.50 per day, $10 per week, $416 per year—Board only, $5.50 per week, dinner only, $3.50 per week.

Upon its closing on April 30, 1849, the New York Herald wrote: "In times gone by, it was the first hotel of the country, and the great men of the country always patronized it … ". It was once owned by Ezra Weeks. In 1828 John Jacob Astor bought it. He gave it to a granddaughter, Sara Langdon, who married Francis Robert Boreen in 1834, as a dowry. In 1849–50 she replaced it with a block of stores called the Boreel Building, and in 1878–79 replaced that with an office building, also called the Boreel Building.

== See also ==
- List of former hotels in Manhattan
