= Dauphin Hotel =

Demolished hotel in Manhattan, New York

Coordinates: 40.774°N 73.982°W

The Dauphin Hotel was an establishment located on the west block front of Broadway between 66th Street and 67th Street on the Upper West Side of Manhattan in New York City. In 1958, the ballroom of the hotel was behind Julia Murphy's Bar. The Dauphin Hotel was demolished as part of the excavation for the Lincoln Center for the Performing Arts. By 1964, the site was taken by the Empire Mutual Insurance Group building. This edifice also occupied the space where the Marie Antoinette Hotel previously stood. The area is currently occupied by a variety of retail stores including Raymour & Flanigan, Zara, and Pottery Barn, as well as a residential building.

== Hotel chronology ==
1894: William Flanagan opens a new hotel on the corner of Broadway and West 66th Street, named the Hotel Marie Antoinette. He also owns the adjacent empty lot on the corner of Broadway and West 67th Street.

1901: Flanagan sells the empty lot to a syndicate that includes the Antoinette's manager, Albert Keen.

1902-1903: Syndicate constructs and then opens a hotel on the lot. Although unaffiliated with the older hotel, Keen markets itself as an expansion of Marie Antoinette.

1926: Hotelier Joseph Goulet takes over the lease on the older hotel. A lawsuit eventually establishes that the newer hotel cannot use the name, and it is renamed Hotel Dauphin.

C.D. Halsey & Company moved its offices from the Hotel Dauphin to the Sherman Square Hotel, Broadway and 70th Street, in November 1929. In 1942, it was purchased by investor Benjamin Winter, Sr.

In May 1946 the Dauphin Hotel was designated as a depot in an Emergency Food Collection Drive coordinated by the American Women's Voluntary Services. It was one of five collection repositories in Manhattan. Mayor of New York City William O'Dwyer requested residents of the city to not eat bread, pies, cakes, and pastries at evening meals on Tuesday, Wednesday, and Thursday. On these three nights meals would be dedicated to "Freedom From Famine", to end hunger abroad.

New York Supreme Court Justice Kenneth O'Brien voided a 15% increase given the hotel in a case involving forty tenants, in May 1948.

Donald Davis, son of playwright Owen Davis, resided at the Dauphin Hotel in May 1949. He worked for the American Broadcasting Company.

The American Irish Minutemen of 1949 maintained their headquarters at the hotel. Numbering 1,000 members, the group organized pickets outside the Empire State Building on May 31, 1949. They protested a recent vote of the British House of Commons to permit the parliament of Northern Ireland to vote on the status of the six counties in the country. They encouraged a plebiscite conducted by the United Nations instead.

Gilbert Gabriel, drama critic for Cue magazine and president of the New York Drama Critics Circle, resided at the hotel until his death in September 1952. While away from New York City he had lived with his wife, painter and lithographer Ada Vorhaus Gabriel, since 1931.

Mrs. Henry B. Harris, a survivor of the RMS Titanic disaster, resided at the Dauphin Hotel in 1958. Her husband was lost with the ship. She was one of eight survivors of the ship's sinking who lived in New York at the time. A Night To Remember was shown especially for Harris and twenty others in a lounge off the main lobby of the hotel in October 1958. The English made motion picture was not released in theaters until December.

A showing of paintings by Elsig Springer was held at the Dauphin Hotel in June 1960.

== Deaths ==
Louis De Franklin Munger, inventor of the demountable automobile rim and manufacturer of bicycles, died of heart disease at the hotel, in July 1929. Morris Robinson, 75, a retired lawyer and former executive of I. Rokeach, Inc., makers of grocery products, died at the hotel in October 1952. He was a resident there for many years. Carlton Miles, playwright and theatrical agent, died of a heart attack at his Dauphin Hotel apartment in September 1954. He was the press agent for Alfred Lunt and Lynn Fontanne for fifteen years.

Corrado Muccini, of the Metropolitan Opera musical staff, died in his Dauphin Hotel apartment in March 1959. He was sixty years of age. Muccini was previously a conductor in his native Italy and South America before coming to the United States in 1953. Dr. George Louis Meylan, medical director of Columbia University died in his apartment at the hotel in February 1960. He was 86. A native of Le Brassus, Sweden, Meylan was Columbia's medical director from 1903 - 1929.

== Last days ==
Stanley J. Harte, owner of the Empire Mutual building, purchased the Dauphin Hotel and the Marie Antoinette Hotel for $3 million when his structure needed extra space. He resold the land to another insurance company and leased it back for forty years, with options of thirty and twenty-nine additional years. Concurrently Sonnenblick-Goldman obtained a $3.3 million leasehold mortgage from Harte for twenty-five years with a thirty-year option. There was an additional option to add five stories when necessary. The expansion was ongoing in December 1964.

== See also ==
- List of former hotels in Manhattan
