= Weylin Hotel =

Hotel in New York City

Coordinates: 40°45′36.13″N 73°58′24.69″W

The Weylin Hotel was a hotel at 527 - 531 Madison Avenue and 40 - 54 East 54th Street in New York City. It was on the southeast corner of 54th Street. The structure was sixteen stories tall and opened in March 1921. The building fronted sixty-one feet on Madison Avenue and one hundred forty-eight feet on 54th Street. It contained 125,000 square feet (11,600 m^{2}) of space.

== Ownership ==
The name of the hotel came from the owners, "Wey" from part owner Weymer H Waitt and "lin" from Franklin M. Haines the 2nd part owner. J. Thomas Russell became managing director of the hotel in 1921. The same year, while the Volstead Act was law in the United States, two arrests were made at the hotel for selling champagne. Ex-furrier Louis R. Ritter invested in the Weylin Hotel and Paramount Hotel. He built the LaGuardia Hotel at LaGuardia Airport. Ritter sold the Weylin Hotel to two bankers in 1951.

The hotel was purchased by Byro Associates, Inc., a syndicate, in March 1953. The purchase price was in excess of $2,200,000. The syndicate obtained the stock of the Hotel Weylin Company owned by Louis and Charles Loeber. The hotel value was assessed at $1,750,000. It had 340 rooms. Modernization plans were assigned to Holabird & Root & Burgee, Chicago, Illinois architects. There were plans to remodel guest rooms and public areas, with the entire hotel becoming air conditioned.

The Weylin Hotel was remortgaged to the Ponce de Leon Company at 231 East Flagler Street in Miami, Florida for 5 years at 5%; $300,000, in March 1953. The establishment had a prior mortgage of $1,875,000. Hurley & Hughes, architects, charged the Weylin Hotel Corporation $6,500 for alterations in April 1953. Byro Associates, Inc., appointed James Bingham Morris hotel manager in May 1953. Morris began his career with the Prince George Hotel. He formerly managed the Rowe Hotel in Grand Rapids, Michigan, the Brown Palace Hotel in Denver, Colorado, and the Carter Hotel in Cleveland, Ohio. The advertising account for the Weylin Hotel was obtained by the firm of Kastor, Farrell, Chesley & Clifford, Inc., in July 1953.

== Hotel chronology ==
In October 1934 Guy Rennie, cabaret entertainer at the Weylin Hotel, was put on trial for disorderly conduct. It was alleged that he caused a crowd to gather outside the hotel by his use of "loud and boisterous language".

Hotel management added $120 to actress Lupe Vélez's bill for carpet damage in December 1938.

Stephen Rowe Bradley, 3rd, a nine-year-old from Lowell, Massachusetts, died after falling from a 6th floor window of the Weylin Hotel in August 1943. The fall occurred when Bradley pushed aside a table in front of the window and stood on the window ledge to look down. He lost his balance.

Paris Elite acquired a commercial lease in the hotel in March 1950. Ruth Shotland Originals, a women's clothing store, was granted a business lease in the hotel in August 1952.

John Boettiger, newspaperman and former son-in-law of President Franklin Delano Roosevelt, jumped to his death from a seventh floor room of the hotel in November 1950. He was divorced from Anna Roosevelt Halsted in 1949. He left two notes, neither of which explained why he committed suicide. His brother attributed his death to his depression about the failure of the Arizona Times. This was a newspaper he founded with Anna Roosevelt in 1947.

Mrs. Gerald De Courcy May either jumped or fell from her eighth floor apartment in the hotel in February 1952. She was prominent in social circles in New York City and Southampton, New York. Detectives surmised that she may have fallen while opening a window. She had been sick for a couple of months.

A committee representing former world and Olympic athletes from Albania, Bulgaria, Czechoslovakia, Estonia, Hungary, Latvia, Lithuania, Poland, Romania, and Yugoslavia sent a petition to Lausanne, Switzerland in May 1952 asking that they be permitted to participate in the 1952 Winter Olympics at Helsinki, Finland. A meeting at the Weylin Hotel the same month endorsed the movement.

The American Horse Shows Association opened a new national headquarters at the Weylin Hotel in July 1954.

== Office building ==
The Weylin Hotel was converted to an office building in January 1956. The Weylin Hotel Corporation sold the establishment to Louis Sachar, president of the Marshall Management Corporation of 244 Madison Avenue, in Association with Jacques Schwalbe. Collins, Tuttle & Co. were named managing agents. Its property value was assessed at $1,700,000. 55,000 square feet (5,100 m^{2}) of office space was rented at the time of the sale. With this acquisition, Sachar and the corporations he owned were primary interest holders in eighty-nine commercial and industrial buildings in Manhattan. Sachar formed a real estate syndicate with a purchasing power estimated at $250,000,000 shortly before the purchase of the Weylin Hotel. Marshall Management supervised six large pension funds and trust funds. Wechsler & Schimenti were assigned the task of the architectural conversion from hotel to office building. Itkin was in charge of design. Modernization of the lobby, elevators, and remodeling from the second floor up was estimated to cost $300,000.

The J.M. Tenney Corporation purchased a leasehold on the building in August 1959. It was bought for a $1,000,000 from the Forsted Realty Company. The deal was brokered by William Faver of the Sonnenblick-Goldman Corporation. The Sular Realty Corporation, in which J.M. Tenney was the primary stockholder, became the manager of the building. A plan to convert the elevators to self-service was initiated. The sixteen story edifice included a penthouse office.

== See also ==
- List of former hotels in Manhattan
