= Pabst Hotel =

Demolished hotel in Manhattan, New York

Coordinates: 40°45′23″N 73°59′11″W

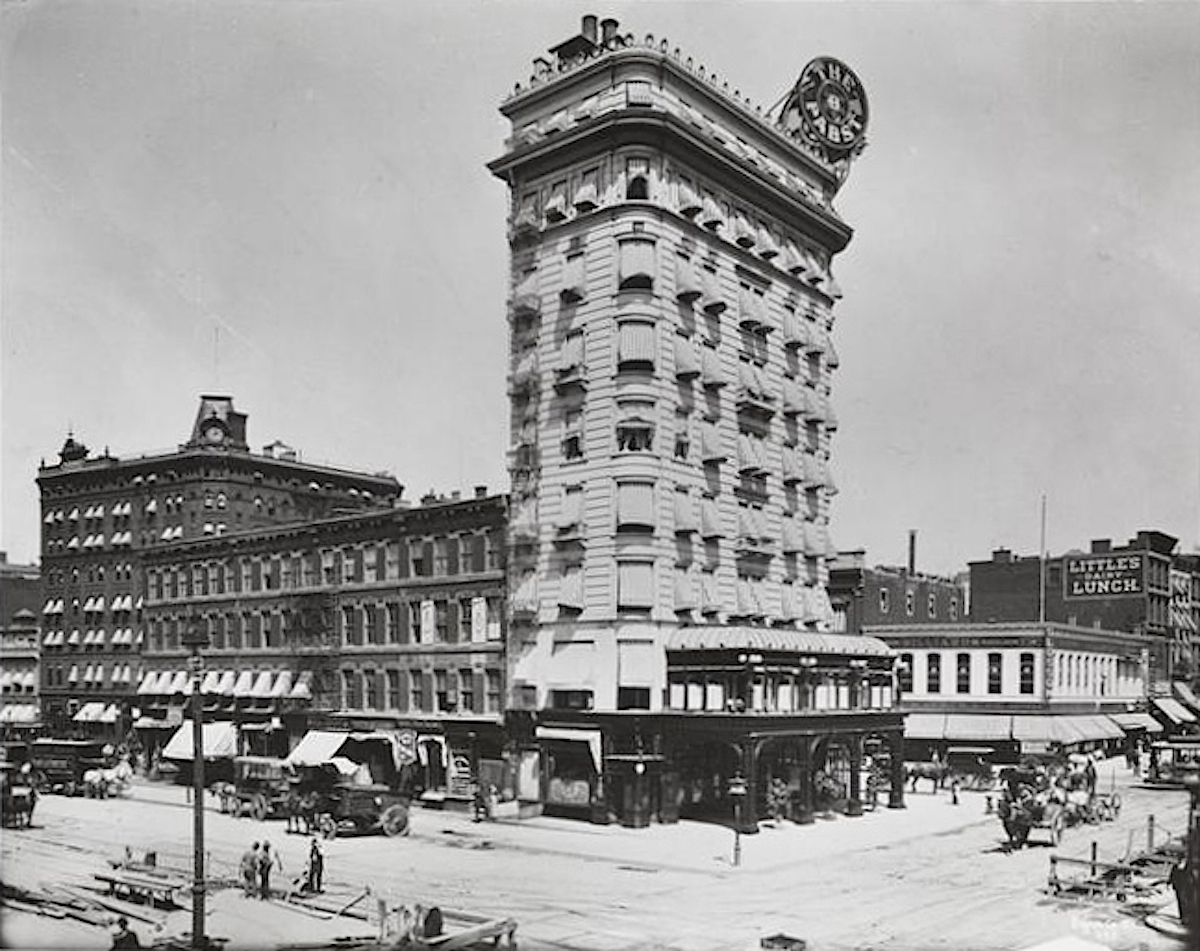
- Interactive map of the Pabst Hotel area

General information
- Location: New York City, 153 West 42nd Street (also 1469 Broadway and 603 7th Avenue)
- Construction started: October 1898
- Opened: November 11, 1899
- Demolished: November 24, 1902
- Cost: $225,000
- Renovation cost: $50,000
- Owner: Charles Thorley

Technical details
- Structural system: steel-frame
- Material: limestone
- Floor count: 9
- Grounds: 58 x 25 feet

Design and construction
- Architect: Henry F. Kilburn
- Other designers: Otto Strack (portico)
- Main contractor: Robinson & Wallace

Other information
- Number of rooms: 35 guestrooms

The Pabst Hotel occupied the north side of 42nd Street in Manhattan, New York City, between 7th Avenue and Broadway, in Longacre Square, from 1899 to 1902. It was demolished to make room for the new headquarters of The New York Times, for which Longacre Square was renamed Times Square.

To the Pabst Brewing Company, the hotel and its restaurants were part of a nationwide program for promoting its beer. This facility, however, conflicted not only with the Times, but also with plans for New York's new subway system.

== Pabst ==
In the 1890s the Pabst Brewing Company of Milwaukee embarked upon a program of acquiring restaurants and hotels—at one time controlling nine of them in Chicago, Minneapolis, San Francisco, and New York—giving the resorts its name and serving only its own products. (Note: In New York, a parallel company, also called Pabst Brewing Company, was in charge.) It subleased the properties to professional facilities operators.

In New York, Pabst came to control:

- the Pabst Loop Hotel in Coney Island, which opened in 1900. It burned down in 1908.
- the Pabst Harlem Music Hall and Restaurant, which opened in September 1900 opposite the Harlem Opera House on 125th Street. It was billed as the largest restaurant in the world, seating 1,400 patrons. It became an S.H. Kress store after prohibition closed it in 1919; the Harlem riot of 1935 began there.
- the Pabst Grand Circle Hotel and Restaurant on 58th Street, which opened in February 1903, together with the Majestic Theatre, with which it was built. ("Grand Circle" was an earlier name for Columbus Circle.) It was demolished in 1954 and replaced by the New York Coliseum and later the Time Warner Center.

== The building ==
Pabst itself leased the building from Charles Thorley, who built it on ground leased from Henry Dolan for five 21-year terms. Thorley leased it to the brewing company for the remainder of the first term in 1899; Pabst leased it to Jame B. Regan, who ran it as proprietor. It stood on the south end of the slender triangular block formed by the intersection of 7th Avenue and Broadway, the rest of which belonged to the estate of Amos R. Eno (November 1, 1810 – February 21, 1898) and was occupied by an older group of five four-story brick buildings, also Eno's, which tapered in width from south to north to fit the block.

The principal architect, Henry F. Kilburn, designed a nine-story tower with a steel frame and limestone cladding—still a new construction method at the time. Floors 3 through 9 each had five bedrooms. Construction began in October 1898, and the opening was November 11, 1899. The building cost $225,000 and Pabst made additional improvements for $50,000.

An advertisement on the back wall read: "The 'Pabst' / Ladies' & Gentlemen's Restaurant / Rathskeller / Bachelor's Hotel." The building's footprint was small, 58 feet wide by 25 feet deep, but the restaurant, on the second floor, and the rathskeller, in the basement, were not confined by the property lines. The rathskeller used space under the sidewalks, which was common and lawful, and the restaurant extended over the 42nd Street portico, which had been built on the sidewalk without authorization. This was common, too, but not lawful. (Note: Otto Strack constructed the porch, portico, and enclosed balcony for Regan. John Pirkl furnished the ironwork.)

== The portico ==
In July 1900, The New York Times criticized city officials for allowing the illegal portico, which it called "a gross and insolent encroachment upon a public highway", to remain; however, city officials were no more inclined to move against this encroachment than any of the others. Regan was defiant; the Times was relentless. For two years, in dozens of articles and frequent editorials, the Times informed its readers about its battle to get city officials to enforce the law by removing the portico, while the officials, according to the Times, resisted every way they could (Note: A search of the online archive of The New York Times from July 8, 1900 through August 3, 1902 for "Pabst Portico" returns about 60 results. This editorial indicates the paper's view.)—e. g.: they claimed confusion over their legal authority; they filed an unnecessary lawsuit against Regan and Thorley, claiming the city lacked the funds to carry out the removal; bills were introduced in the Municipal Assembly and the State Legislature to legalize the portico, but did not become law; and a spurious mandamus lawsuit was filed as a delaying tactic.

Some people questioned the Times' motive for singling out this one violation, when there were so many others.

After many delays, a judge decided against the hotel on November 18, 1901. The portico, he ordered in strong words, must be removed, by the city if necessary, at the hotel's expense. Regan and Thorley appealed, and the Times reported that although city officials could lawfully have acted on the order at once, they chose to delay, pending the outcome.

If the portico was eventually removed, it wasn't reported. (Note: Gray omits the paper's role.)

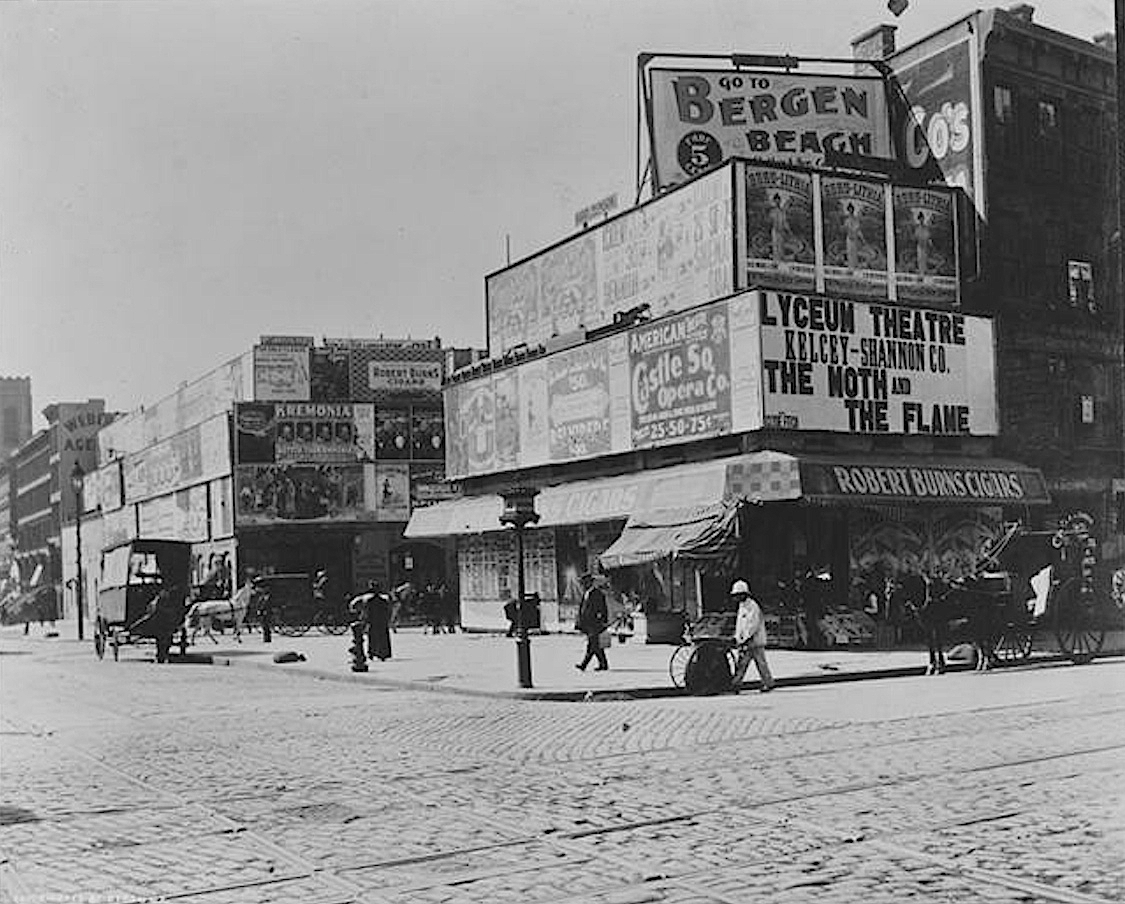
The site in 1898, from the southeast

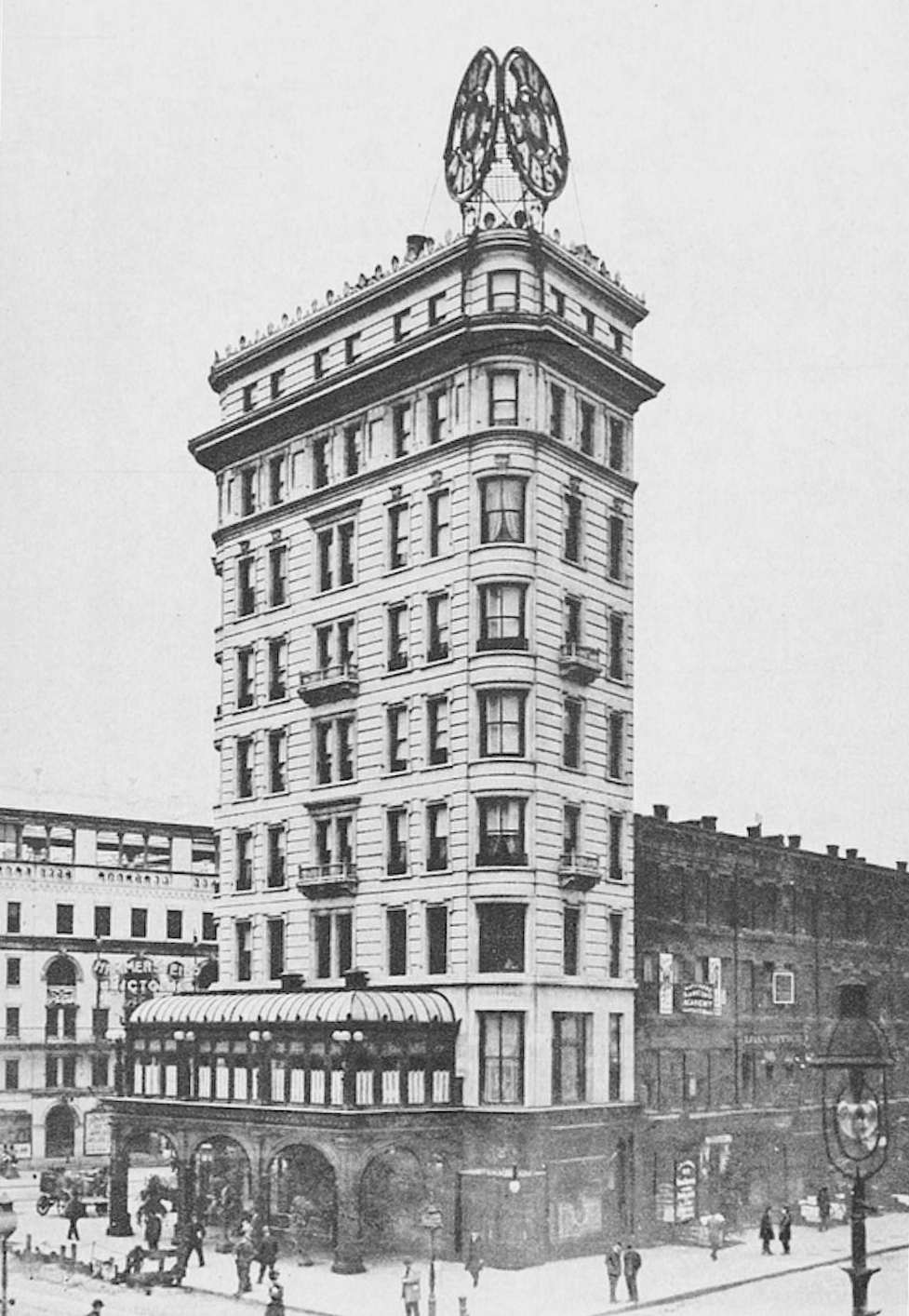
Similar angle

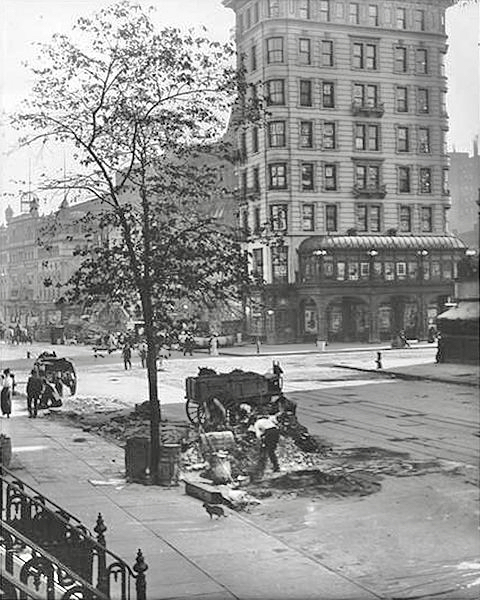
From the southwest

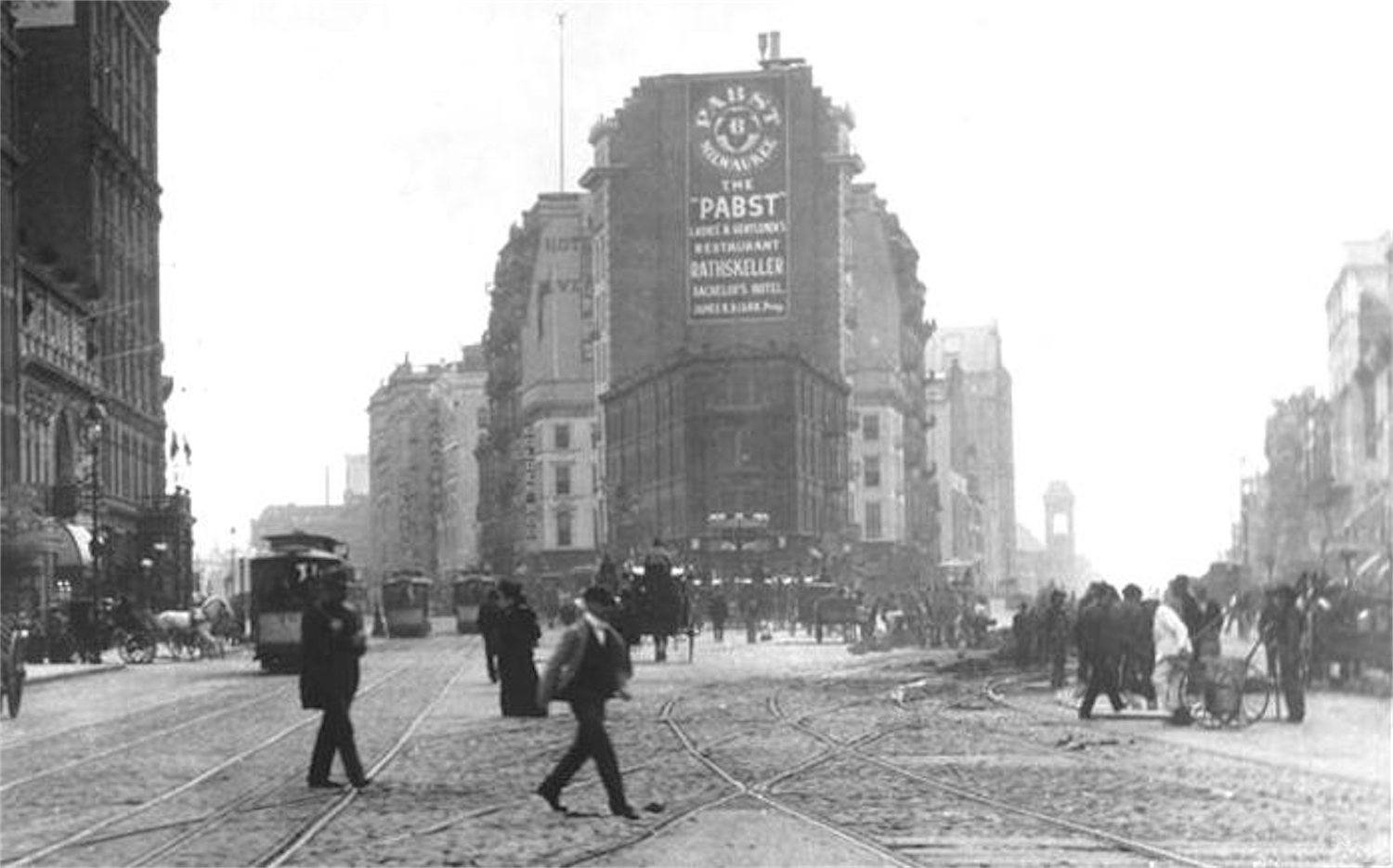
From the north, with Eno buildings

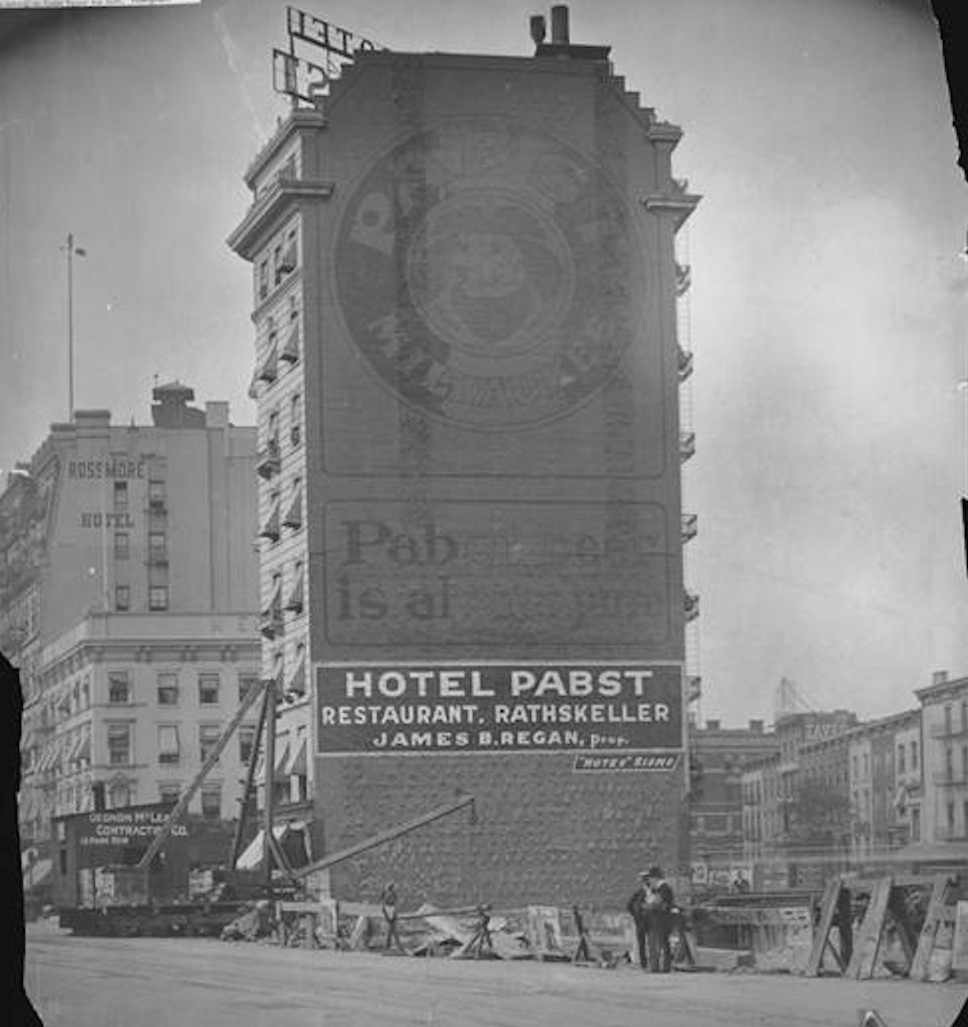
Subway construction

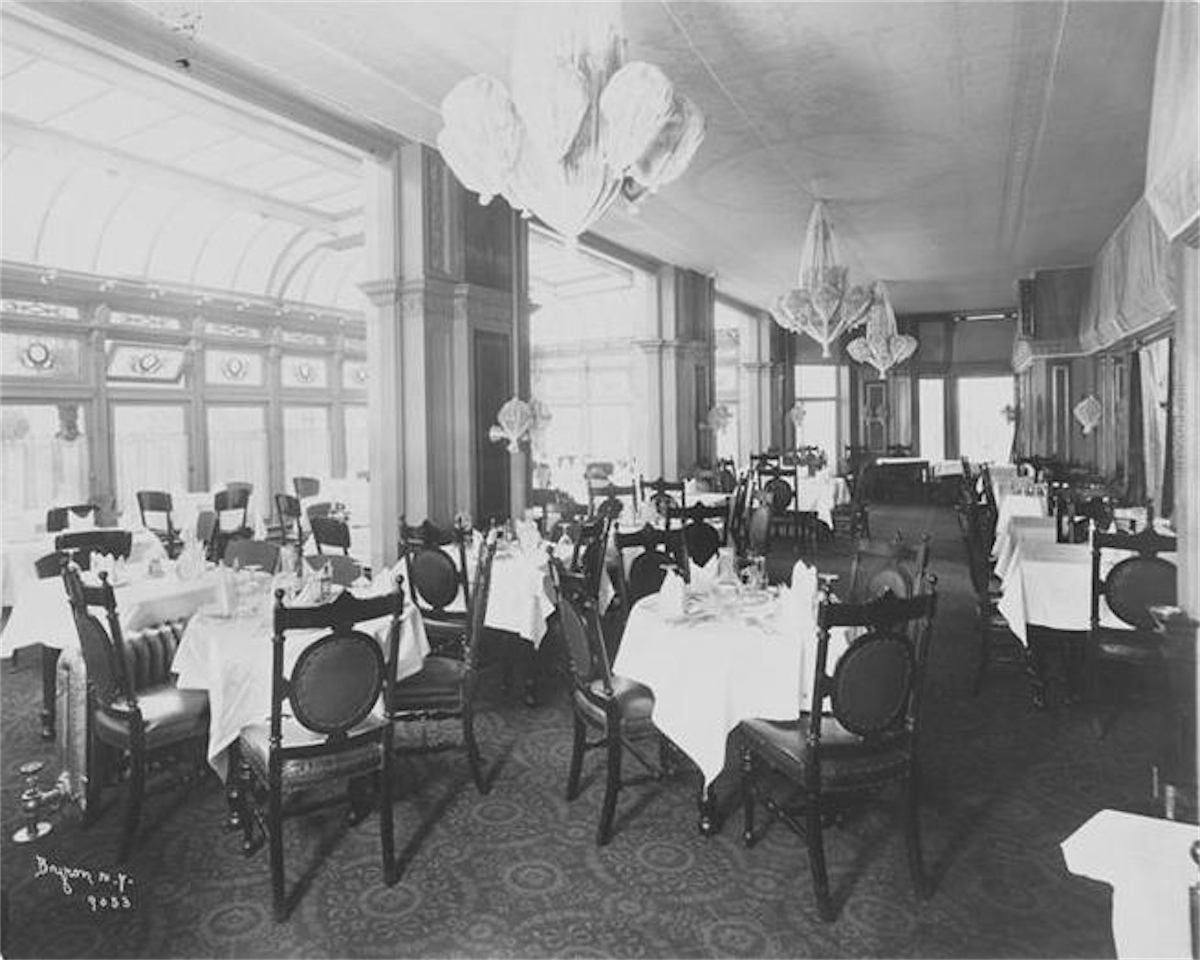
Second-floor restaurant

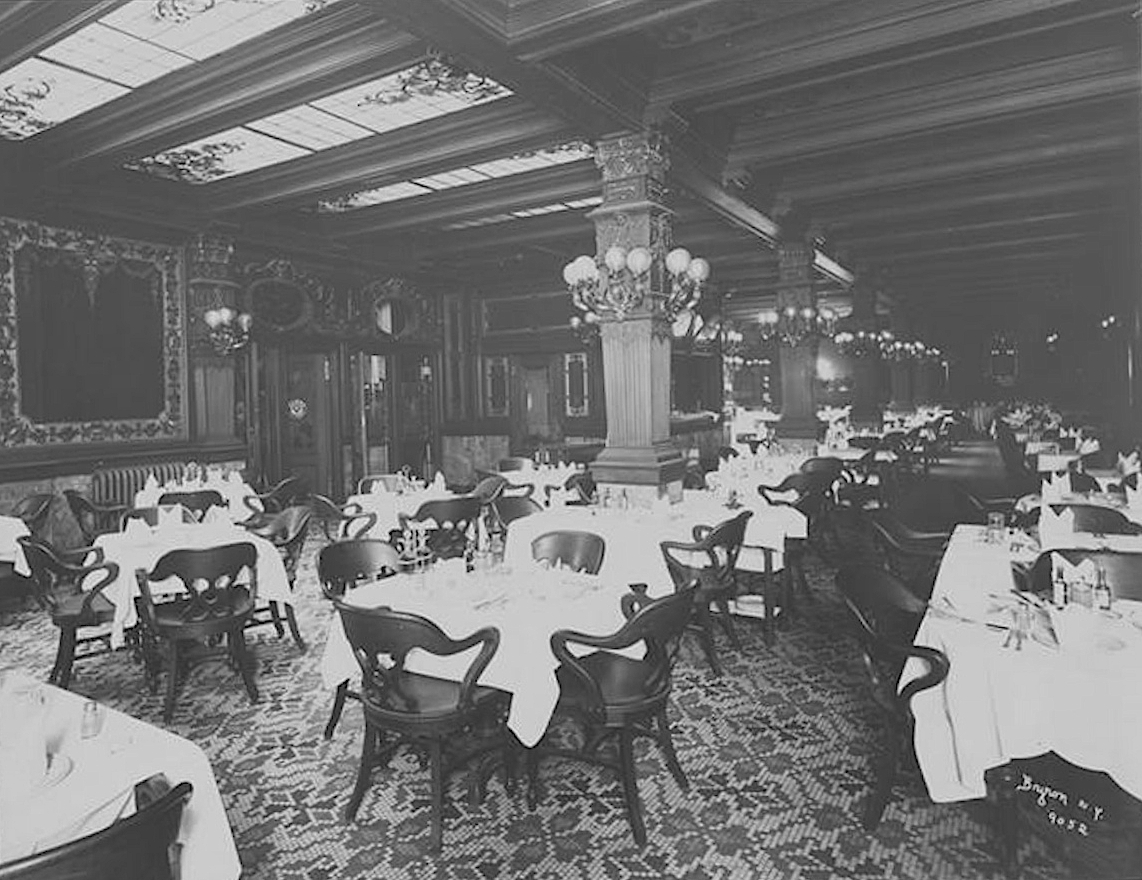
Rathskeller

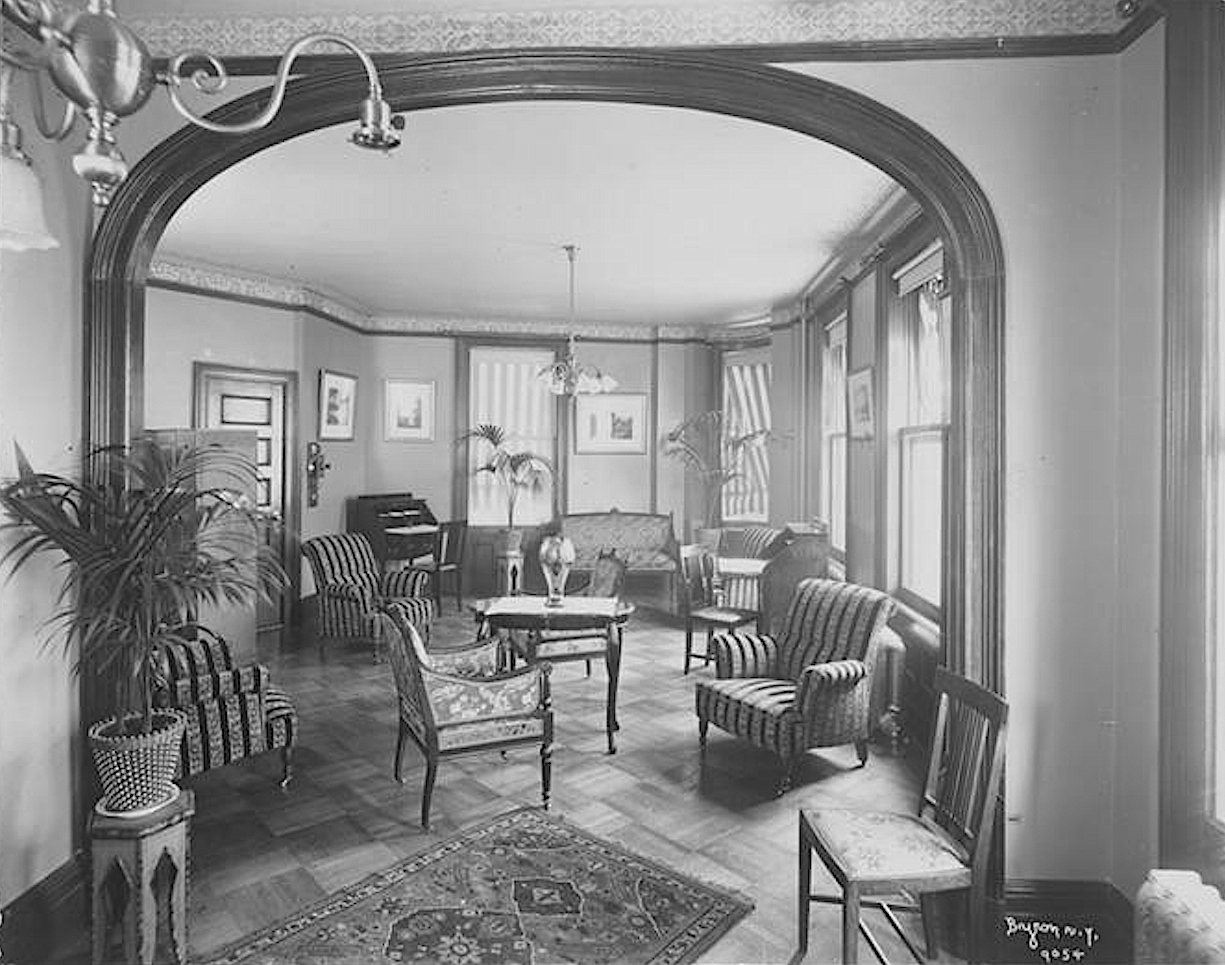
Guestroom

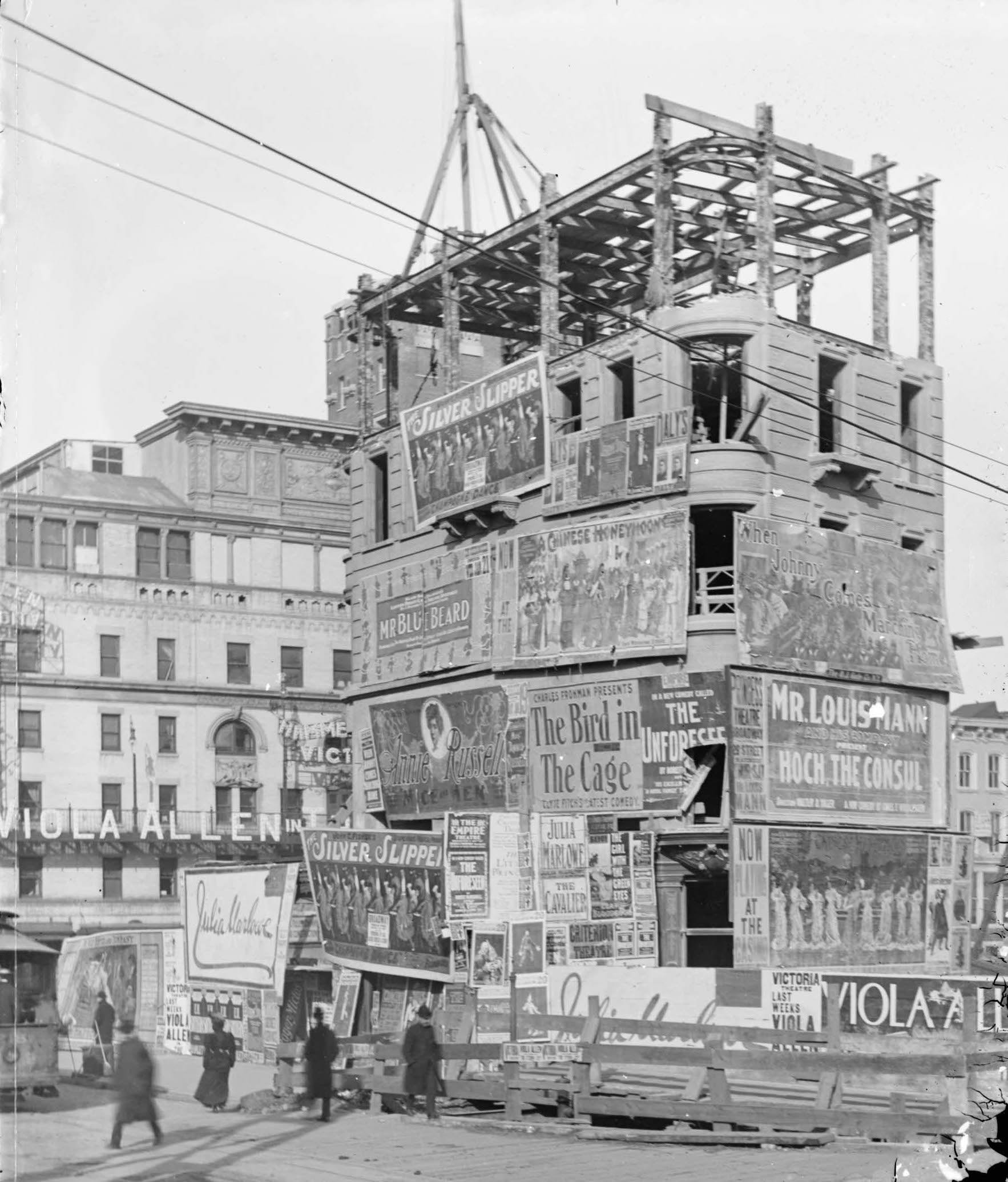
Demolition

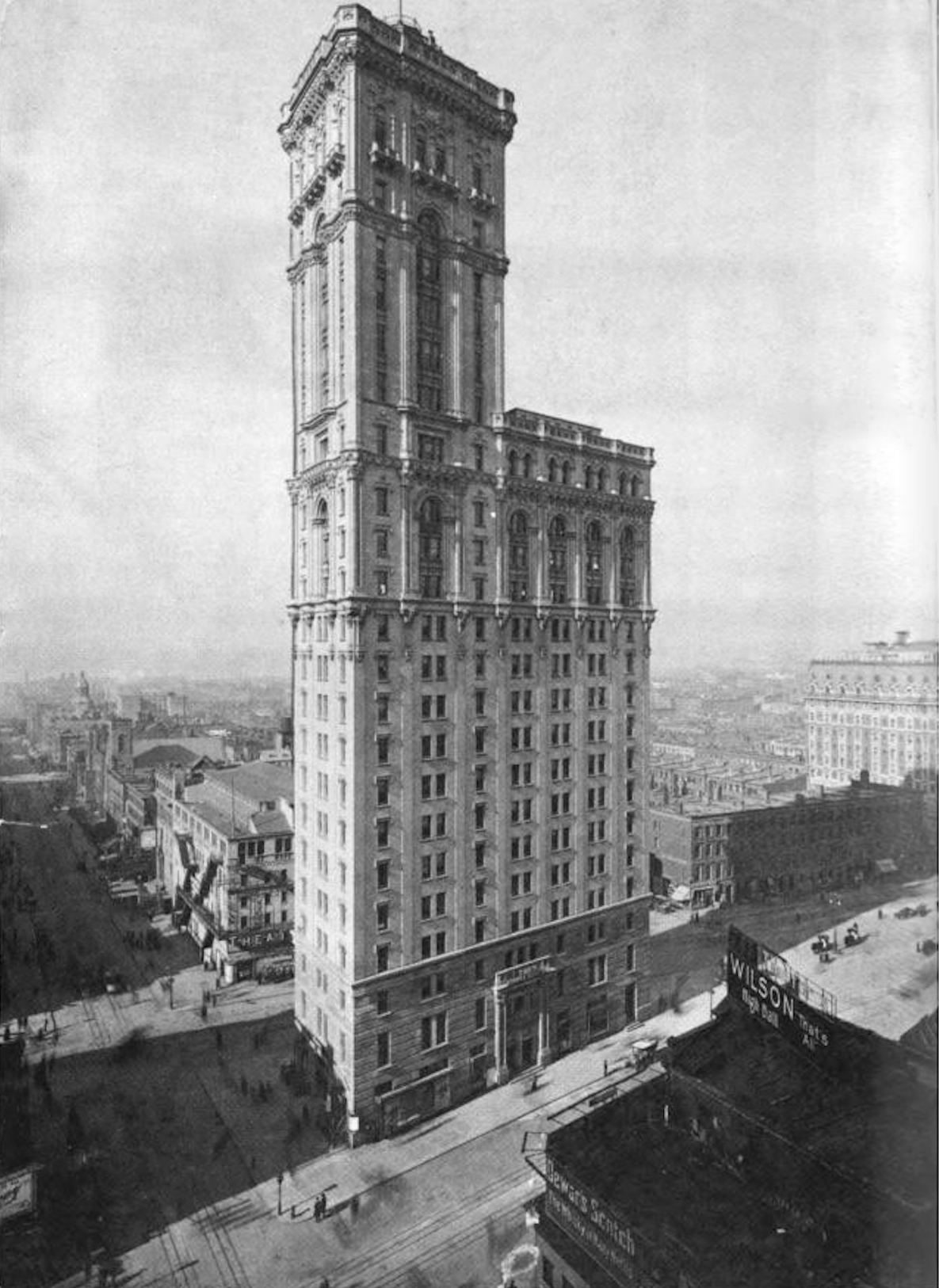
Successor

== The subway ==
New York City's first subway lines were constructed in sections from 1900 to 1904. The main line ran north from the City Hall under the East Side, across town under 42nd Street, north again under 7th Avenue from 43rd to 44th Street, and then under Broadway. The route therefore included a wide curve directly under the Eno property. The Subway Realty Company, an arm of the company building the subway, purchased it from Amos F. Eno (son of Amos R. Eno), demolished the buildings, and excavated an opening for the work. Construction noise was loud, which must have hurt the hotel's business. (Note: "As along the rest of the section, the sub-street material here is almost entirely rock, and the noise of the drills that have already been placed along the edge of the square is unceasing. So hard is the rock, however, that, with all their fuss, they only increase the depth a very little in each twenty-four hours.")

Though the Pabst Hotel would be able to remain, on April 15, 1902, the subway company took possession of the entire cellar room beneath the Broadway side of the building and about half of the space beneath the sidewalk on 42nd Street, for tunnel purposes—a large part of the rathskeller and storage room. Regan and Pabst claimed this nullified the lease with Thorley. (Note: The relationship of the subway to the new Times Building is shown in the special Building Supplement published in The New York Times on January 1, 1905.)

Regan at the time was proprietor of the Woodmansten Inn, the Bronx, and arranged to become proprietor of the grand Knickerbocker Hotel, planned for the southeast corner of 42nd Street and Broadway.

On September 24, 1902, the Pabst Brewing Company filed suit in federal court to recover damages from Thorley.

== The Times and the demolition ==
On August 4, 1902, The New York Times announced that it would give up its long-time home on Park Row near City Hall and move to a neighborhood it predicted would soon be the commercial center of the city: Longacre Square. Its publisher, Adolph S. Ochs, had purchased the former Eno ground from the Subway Realty Company and obtained a long-term lease from Charles Thorley on the ground under the Pabst. The company would build a skyscraper on the triangular block for its own occupancy.

Demolition of the hotel began November 24, 1902. It was the first building completely supported by a steel skeleton ever demolished. The Times reported that professional builders were keen to discover whether the structural members had begun to corrode, which might threaten the structural integrity of the building and the future of the construction method, but nothing alarming was discovered.

On April 8, 1904, Longacre Square was renamed Times Square. The subway, including the Times Square station, opened to the public on October 27. The newspaper moved into its new building Sunday, January 1, 1905, (Note: This means the first issue published from the new location was that of January 2.) although the building wasn't quite complete.

== See also ==
- List of former hotels in Manhattan
