= St. Nicholas Hotel (New York City) =

Former hotel in Manhattan, New York

Coordinates: 40.722505°N 73.999351°W

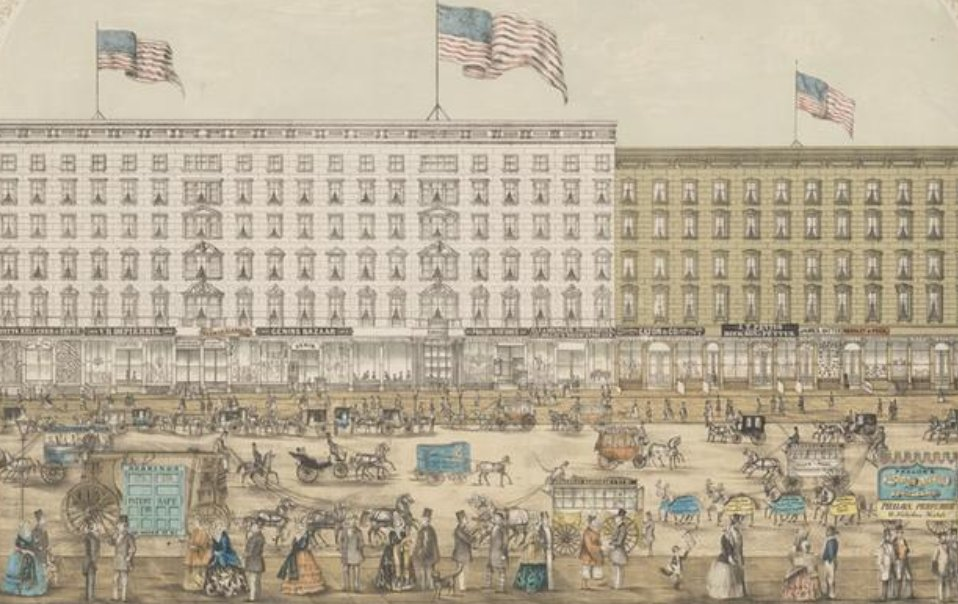
The St. Nicholas Hotel, depicted in an 1855 lithograph by Friedrich Ludwig Heppenheimer

The St. Nicholas Hotel was a 600-room, mid-nineteenth century luxury hotel on Broadway in the neighborhood of SoHo in Manhattan, New York City. It opened on January 6, 1853, and by the end of the year had expanded to 1,000 rooms. The St. Nicholas raised the bar for a new standard of lavish appointments for a luxury hotel. It was the first New York City building to cost over US$1 million. The hotel was said to have ended the Astor House's preeminence in New York hostelry.

== Description ==
The hotel was at 507–527 Broadway in the neighborhood of SoHo in Manhattan. The main central plan and design of the white marble-façade hotel was prepared by the owner D. H. Haight and a well-known hotelier, Mr. Treadwell. The architects involved were J. B. Snook and Griffith Thomas. The hotel building fronted 275 feet on Broadway, 200 feet on Spring Street, and 275 feet on Mercer Street. In progress at the time the hotel opened was an extension that was completed by the end of the year. The expanded hotel had 1,000 guest rooms. The hotel building then took up the full city block between Spring Street and Broome Street. The six-story hotel was of Italian architecture with modified Corinthian elements. The entrance was between four grooved white marble columns.

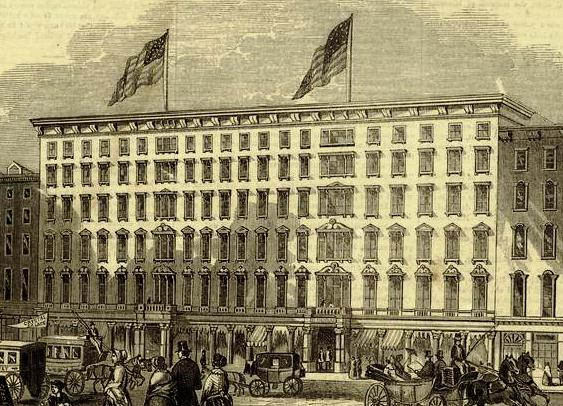
St Nicholas Hotel in 1853

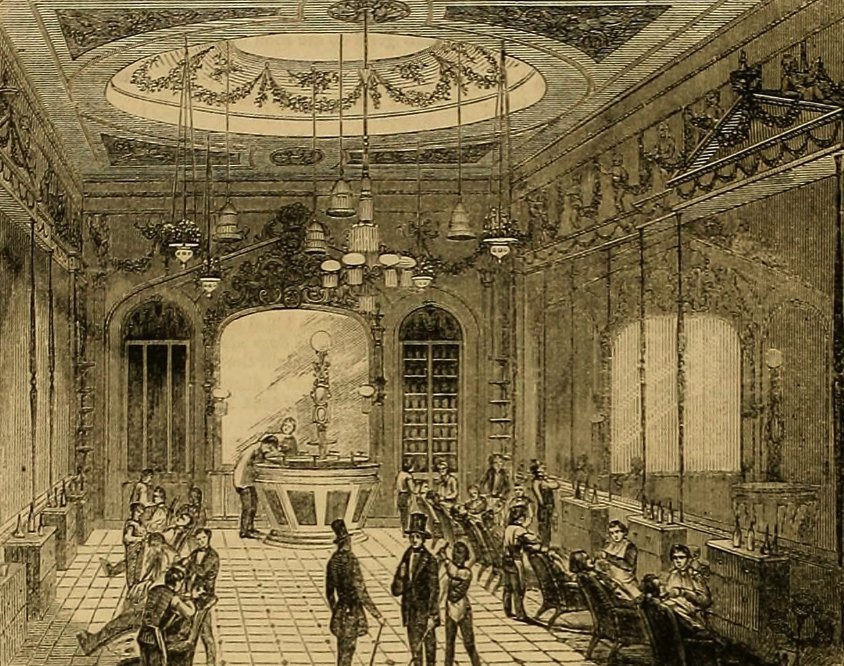
Barbershop

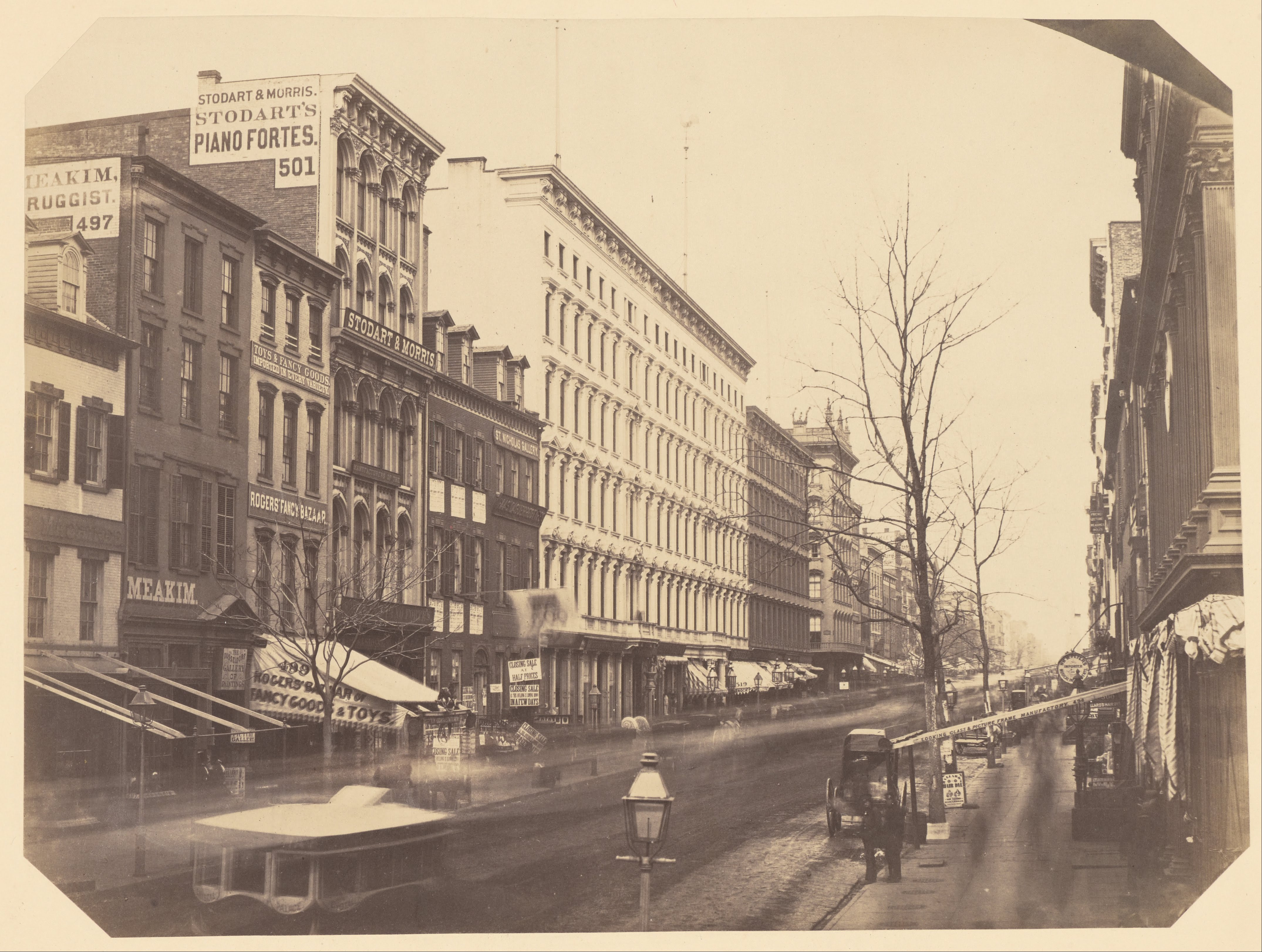
Broadway looking north

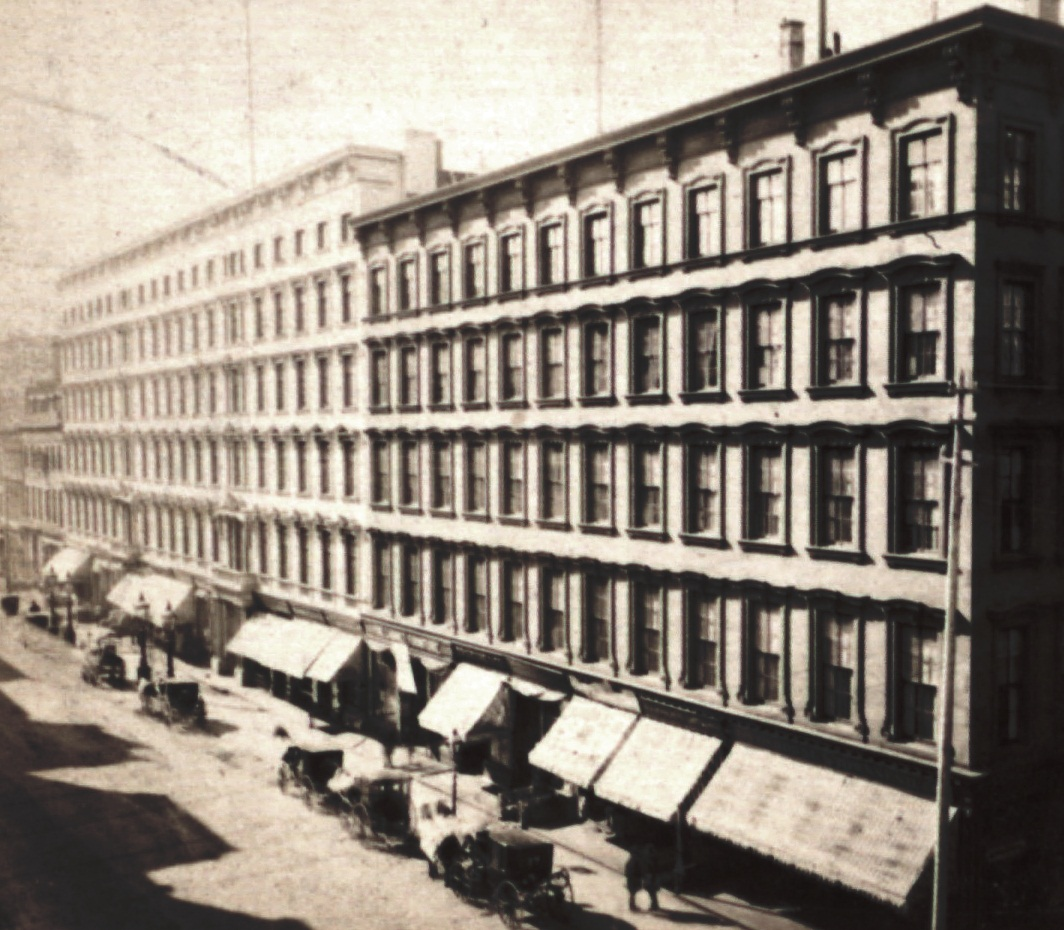
Broadway looking south

== Interior ==
The hotel cost $1.2 million to build and accommodated one thousand guests weekly. Another $700,000 was spent to furnish the hotel completely. It had several dining rooms; on the second floor was the main dining room that could accommodate 400 guests. An elaborate men's hair-cutting salon illustrated by a gilded domed skylight catered to about a dozen guests at a time.

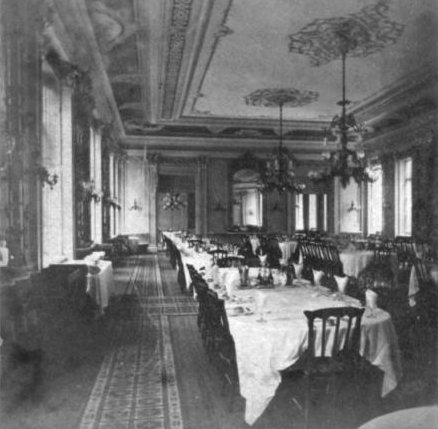
Dining Room

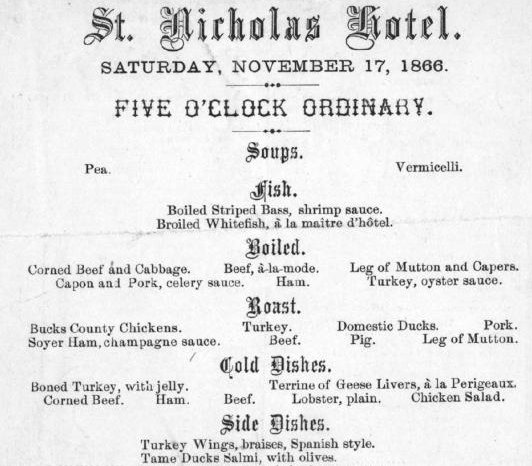
1866 menu

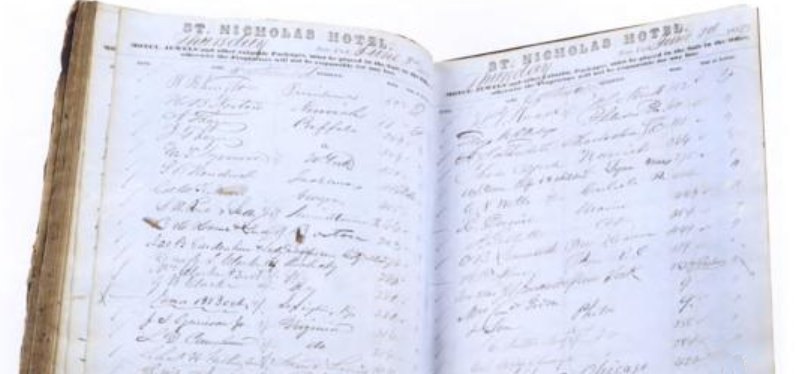
1858 register

The main lobby had a white oak staircase leading to the upper floors. The first landing was illuminated by a $1,100 chandelier, one of many expensive and elaborate lighting fixtures found throughout the hotel. On the wall above this landing was a painting of the Dutch mythical gift-giving figure Sinterklaas (aka St. Nicholas) placing presents into Christmas stockings.

The hotel's public rooms were paneled in mahogany and walnut and lit with gas lights. There was much use of gold paint throughout the hotel. The hotel had window curtains that cost $700 apiece and gold embroidered draperies at $1,000 per pair. Bathrooms featured bathtubs encased in carved walnut and there were many mirrors everywhere. The public hallways on all floors were heated with steam heat, and guestrooms on the sleeping floors each had stoves. The beds had springs. The hotel had a $1,500 grand piano and a bridal chamber that was outfitted with the finest damask. The hotel developed something of a reputation for having a "fast crowd", such that an agreement to an assignation there was reputed to be an admission of loss of chastity – unless it happened to be a bride in the bridal suite.

On the second floor an ornately carved "exquisite rosewood Aeolion piano" produced by Boston's T. Gilbert & Co. featured mother of pearl keys, rather than the then-customary ivory. The hotel's "ingenious call system" connected guest rooms to the main office; bells could be remotely rung using electrical current.

== Significant events ==
The evening of November 25, 1864, the hotel was involved in a terrorist attack by the so-called Confederate Army of Manhattan, that is, Confederate saboteurs who thought they would set fire to New York City. The St. Nicholas was one of more than a dozen of the finest New York hotels that were infested by them with a purpose to set them afire. Other hotels included Astor House and the Metropolitan Hotel. The attempt was ill-conceived and badly executed. The fires largely self-extinguished due to a lack of oxygen; they were set in locked rooms, the technology was not well-developed, and the terrorists were intent on making their own escape.

== Demise ==
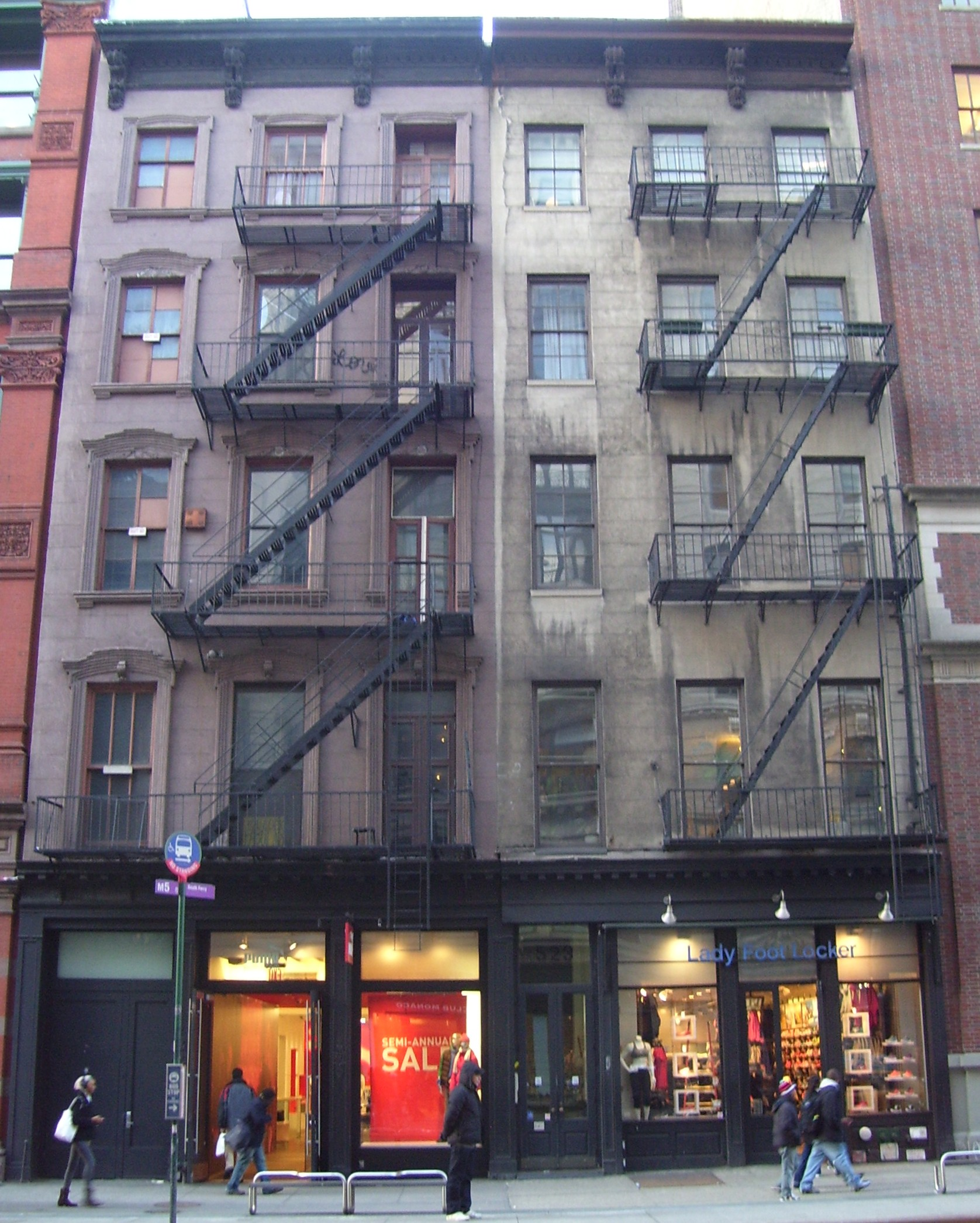
521 and 523

By the later part of the nineteenth century, the hotel had declined in popularity, most New York City tourists preferring to stay farther uptown. Beginning in the mid-1870s, certain parts of the hotel building were converted to other uses. The Snook-designed Loubat store (No. 503–511) took the southern wing in 1878. The central portion (No. 513–519) became Samuel Warner's store and warehouse in 1884. The hotel permanently closed then. A sliver of the original building was saved when the hotel was demolished in the twentieth century. This is now the luxury condos of 521 and 523 Broadway. The upper stories of No. 521 have most of their original ornamented moldings on the windows.

Although the hotel once occupied the entire block adjacent to Broome Street, the building has more or less disappeared; only Lady Footlocker and The Puma Store now occupy the first (ground) floor of the remaining sliver. The opulent exterior was the subject of an 1855 lithograph by artist Frederick Heppenheimer, which is now part of the collection of the Museum of the City of New York, being artifact No. 39.253.6.

== See also ==
- Confederate Secret Service
- New York in the American Civil War
- New York City in the American Civil War

== Sources ==
- Dorsey, Leslie; Devine, Janice (1964). Fare thee well: a backward look at two centuries of historic American hostelries, fashionable spas & seaside resorts. Crown Publishers.
- Johnson, Clint (2010). A Vast and Fiendish Plot: The Confederate Attack on New York City. New York, NY: Citadel Press. p. 201. ISBN 978-0-8065-3131-1. "The St. Nicholas was one of the first hotels to cost more than $1 million in construction costs."
- Landau, Sarah; Condit, Carl W. (1996). Rise of the New York Skyscraper, 1865–1913. New Haven, CT: Yale University Press. ISBN 978-0-300-07739-1. OCLC 32819286.
- McGinty, Brian (1978). The palace inns: a connoisseur's guide to historic American hotels. Stackpole Books. ISBN 9780811711661.
- Pommer, Alfred; Winters, Eleanor (2012). Exploring New York's SoHo. Charleston, South Carolina: The History Press. ISBN 978-1-60949-588-6.
- Sandoval, A.K. (2007). Hotel: An American History. Yale University Press. ISBN 978-0-300-10616-9.
- Williamson, Jefferson (1930). The American Hotel: An Anecdotal History. A.A. Knopf.
