= Sinclair House (Manhattan hotel) =

Demolished hotel in Manhattan, New York

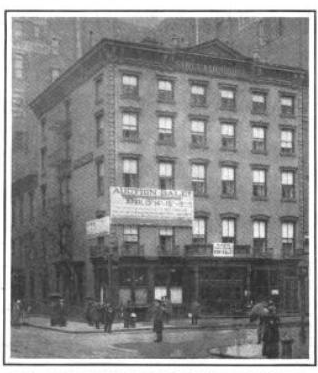
- Interactive map of the Sinclair House area

General information
- Location: 8th St. and Broadway, Manhattan, New York City
- Coordinates: 40.730°N 73.992°W
- Demolished: 1908

Sinclair House was a 19th-century hotel which stood at 754 Broadway and Eighth Street in Manhattan, New York City. It was demolished in 1908.

== History ==
Part of what became the Sinclair House was constructed around 1787, on land purchased by Frederick Charles Hans and Baron Bruno Poelintz from John Jay, Isaac Roosevelt, and Alexander Hamilton. It opened as a roadhouse in 1840, and was purchased by Robert Sinclair around 1855, and then known as the Sinclair House. It catered to downtown businessmen and commercial travelers, and was well-known to the booktrade.

Amaziah L. Ashman was proprietor of Sinclair House from 1863 until his death in 1902. In the first part of that period, he was a partner with James Morton in the venture, and later became sole owner. Ashman was a native of Livingston County, New York and the director of Astor Place Bank. His New York Times obituary described him as "one of the best-known hotel keepers in this country."

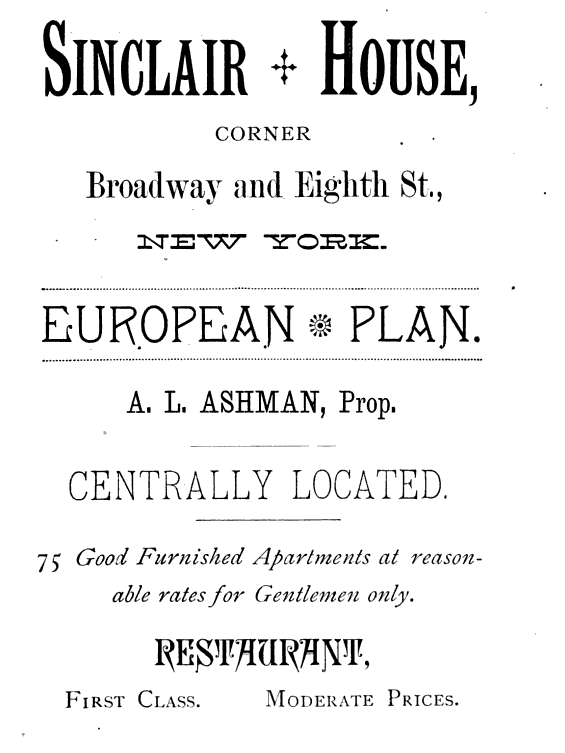
1880 advertisement for Sinclair House. The "European Plan" meant that meals were not included in the room price.

After Ashman died, his widow thereafter operated the hotel until it closed on April 4, 1908, the same day that the Fifth Avenue Hotel closed.

Visitors to Sinclair House included Horace Greeley, William Cullen Bryant, Grover Cleveland, and Sam Ward, the namesake for the hotel restaurant's "Sam Ward Steak." The restaurant in the hotel was well known, described by one New York paper in 1920 as "celebrated for its toothsome terrapin, its canvasback ducks, its turtle soup, its oyster and tripe stews, no less than for its more plebeian corned beef and cabbage."

Francis Marion Crawford's novel Katharine Lauderdale was partially written while he stayed there, and its events are laid out in the same neighborhood. Henry Cuyler Bunner stayed there while writing Short Sixes and his Washington Square stories. Other well-known guests included playwright Paul Potter and explorer Paul Du Chaillu.

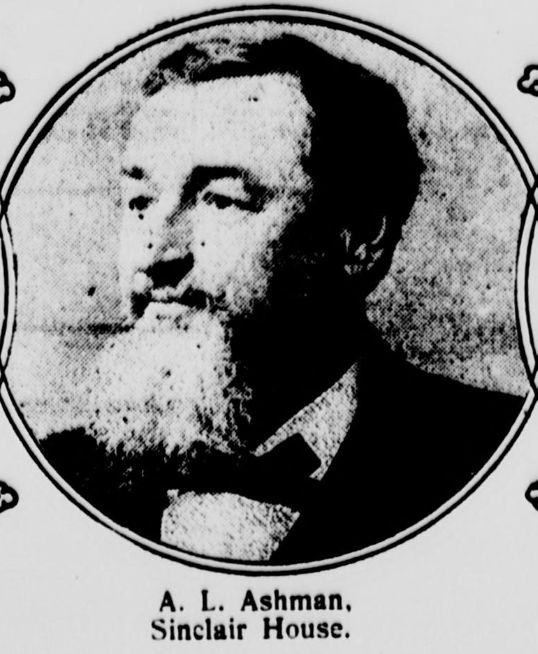
A.L. Ashman

The Sinclair House hosted many events. For example, in November 1863 it hosted a meeting of the mayoralty convention of New York City and the County of New York, organized by the Democratic Party general committee. The same month the establishment was the location of delegate selection of several conventions pertinent to the 5th Ward Union Association.

== Replacement building ==
The hotel was demolished shortly after closing in April 1908 to make way for an office building. A 12-story building was constructed in 1908–09, aka "The Sinclair Building", and is still standing as of 2015.

== See also ==
- List of former hotels in Manhattan
