= Lovejoy's Hotel =

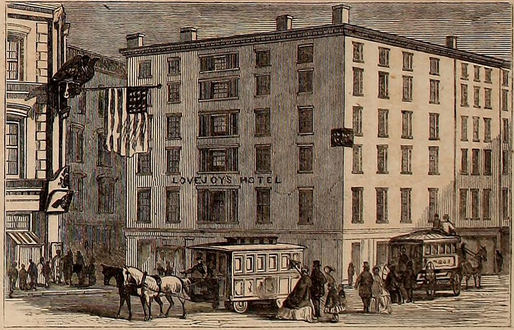
- Lovejoy's Hotel in 1864
- Interactive map of the Lovejoy's Hotel area

General information
- Location: Park Row & Beekman Place, Manhattan, New York City, U.S.
- Coordinates: 40.7115°N 74.0071°W
- Completed: 1830s
- Demolished: 1889

Lovejoy's Hotel was a New York City hotel from the 1830s through 1870. It was located at the corner of Park Row and Beekman Street in a six-story building in the Civic Center neighborhood of Manhattan. The Astor House hotel was opposite it.

== History ==
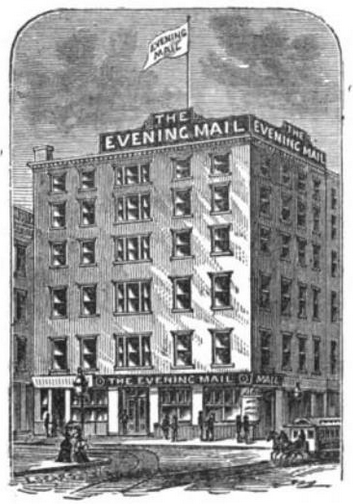
New York Evening Mail at 34 Park Row in 1872

Jonathan Lovejoy was the original proprietor. John P. Huggins later purchased the hotel. Huggins ran the hotel for approximately twenty years before purchasing the Cosmopolitan Hotel with his two brothers.

In 1852, Alvan E. Bovay, a future founder of the United States Republican Party, dined with Horace Greeley at Lovejoy's during the 1852 Whig National Convention. They discussed the need for a new national party, and Bovay suggested it be called the "Republican" party.

The hotel was among those the "Confederate Army of Manhattan" attempted to burn down in November 1864.

Horatio Alger, Jr. mentions Lovejoy's in his 1868 novel Ragged Dick.

== Closure ==
The hotel closed in 1870 and was converted into offices. By now Park Row was dominated by newspapers, and subsequent tenants of the building included the New York Evening Mail and the Rural New Yorker.

The building suffered some damage in the January 1882 fire that destroyed the former Potter Building (and former home of the New York World). But it remained standing until around 1888 or 1889.

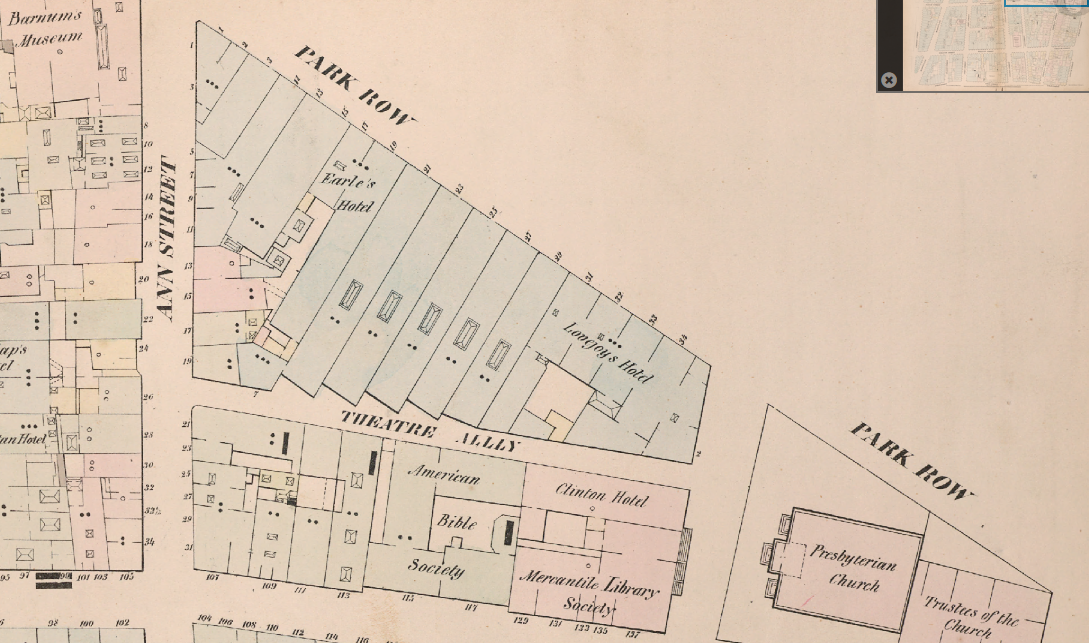
1852 map showing location of Lovejoy's Hotel. Barnum's American Museum can be seen at the top left.
