= Ada Vorhaus Gabriel =

American painter

- Born: July 28, 1898; Larchmont, New York
- Died: 1975 (aged 76–77)
- Known for: Lithography and painting
- Movement: Mid-century modern

Ada Vorhaus Gabriel (July 28, 1898 – 1975) was an American female Mid-century modern painter and lithographer. She studied at Barnard College, the New York School of Design, with Erich Gletter in Munich, and with Emil Ganso in New York. Her work is featured in the collections of The National Gallery of Art, Yale University Art Gallery, Fogg Museum, and Indianapolis Museum of Art.
