= Albemarle Hotel =

Demolished hotel in Manhattan, New York

Coordinates: 40.742556°N 73.989281°W

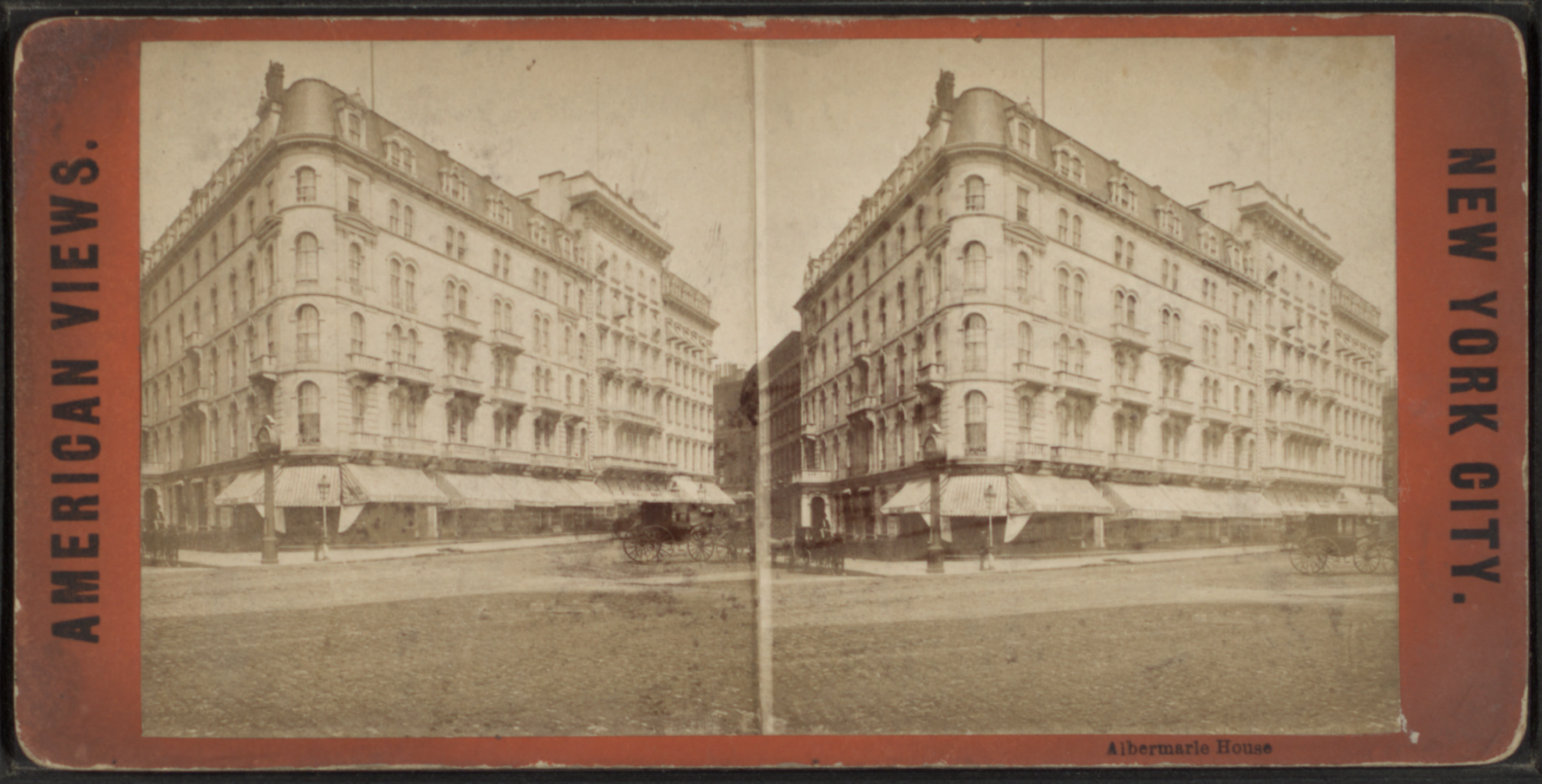
- Albemarle
- Interactive map of the Albemarle Hotel area

General information
- Location: Manhattan, New York City
- Opened: 1860
- Demolished: 1915

Albemarle Hotel (also known as Albemarle House; alternate spelling Albermarle) was located at 1101 Broadway (also addressed as 1 West 24th Street) in the Flatiron District of Manhattan, New York City. Built in 1860 and overlooking Madison Square, it was one of the largest hotels on the avenue in its day.

== History ==
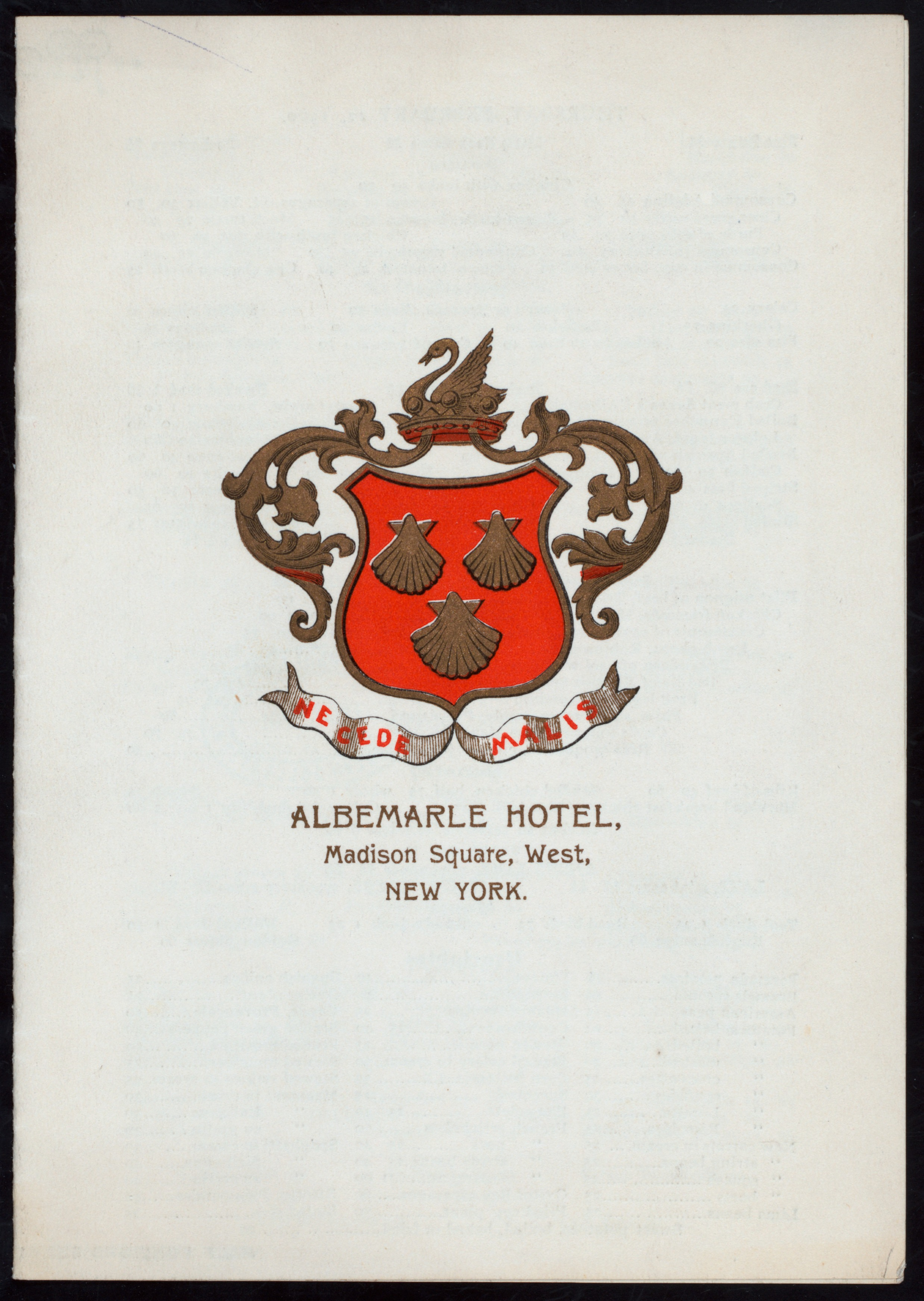
Menu

Albemarle Hotel was located in New York City at the junction of Broadway, Fifth Avenue, and 24th Street, facing Madison Square. Its location was convenient to theatres, churches, halls, clubs, and retail stores. It was opened by George D. Ives in 1860. Proprietors included Louis H. Janvrin and Henry Walter (d. 1903) who refitted and furnished it. The culinary department was under the management of a French chef, and the cuisine included the rarest of everything that the markets provided.

== Architecture and fittings ==
The hotel was built of white marble, six stories in height. The interior appointments were luxurious. The plumbing and sanitary arrangements were under the supervision of the sanitary engineer, Charles T. Wingate. The offices, reception and dining rooms were frescoed and decorated, and connected with the floors above by spacious staircases and a safety passenger elevator. The accommodations served upwards of 150 guests. Many of the rooms were en suite, affording parlor, bedrooms and bathroom, all self-contained and luxuriously furnished. Many of these suites were permanently occupied by wealthy citizens. The Albemarle's halls and corridors were wide, while the rooms were handsomely furnished and elegant in their appointments, fixtures and upholstery.

== Demolition ==
The hotel closed in the mid-1910s and along with the adjacent Hoffman House was replaced with a sixteen-story building in 1915. That building has since been replaced with a condominium tower called 10 Madison Square West.

== Bibliography ==
- Bradstreet Company (1886). Bradstreet's Weekly: A Business Digest (Public domain ed.). Bradstreet Company.
- Croker & Telfer (1873). The Beach Pneumatic Transit Company's Broadway Underground Railway, New York City: With Complete Maps of the City of New York and Adjacent Territory, Showing the Main Lines and Connections of the Broadway Underground Railway, Profiles of the Routes, Etc. : Together with Approximate Estimates of Cost and Traffic, Text of the Charters of the Beach Pneumatic Transit Company, Legal Proceedings and Miscellaneous Information (Public domain ed.). Croker & Telfer.
- Gouge, Henry Albert (1881). New System of Ventilation: Which Has Been Thoroughly Tested Under the Patronage of Many Distinguished Persons (Public domain ed.). D. Van Nostrand. p. 171.
- Historical Publishing Company (1884). New York's Great Industries: Exchange and Commercial Review, Embracing Also Historical and Descriptive Sketch of the City, Its Leading Merchants and Manufacturers ... (Public domain ed.). Historical Publishing Company.
- Trow, John F. (1865). Wilson's Business Directory of New-York City (Public domain ed.). John F. Trow.
