= Astor House =

Former hotel in Manhattan, New York

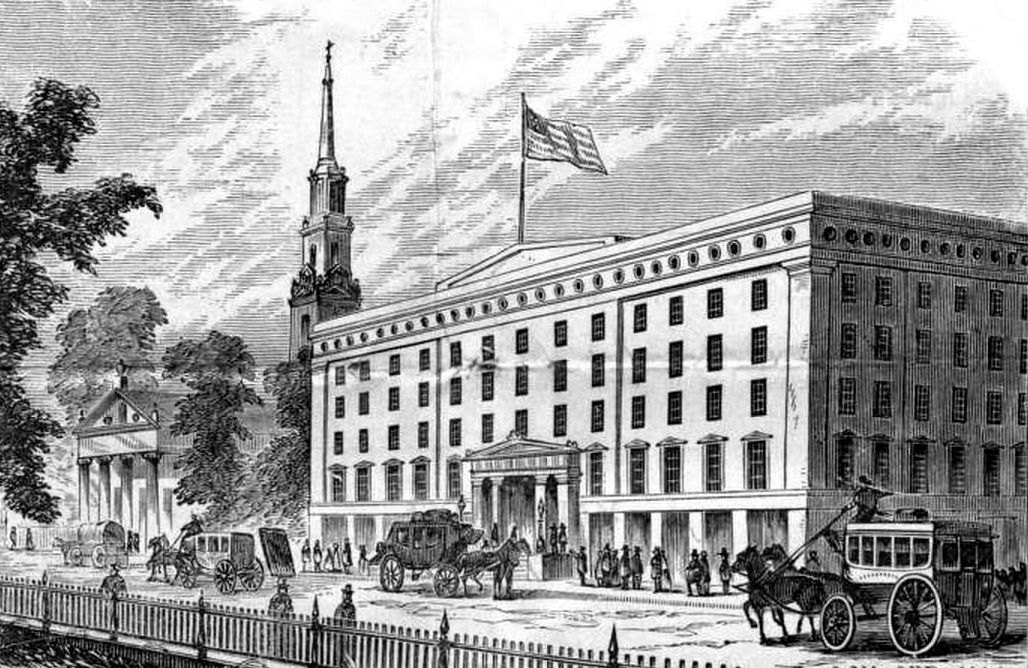
- The Astor House in 1862, with St. Paul's Chapel to the left and Trinity Church behind it
- Interactive map of the Astor House area

General information
- Location: Manhattan, New York City, U.S.
- Coordinates: 40°42′42.5″N 74°0′30.8″W
- Inaugurated: 1836
- Demolished: 1913–1926

The Astor House was a luxury hotel in New York City. Located on the corner of Broadway and Vesey Street in what is now the Civic Center and Tribeca neighborhoods of Lower Manhattan, it opened in 1836 and soon became the best-known hotel in America. Part of it was demolished in 1913; the rest was demolished in 1926.

== History and description ==
The Astor House was built by John Jacob Astor, who assembled the lots around his former house until he had purchased the full block in the heart of what was then the city's most fashionable residential district. Construction began in 1834, and the hotel opened in June 1836 as the Park Hotel. It was located on the west side of Broadway between Vesey and Barclay Streets, across from City Hall Park and diagonally across from the offices of the New York Herald. The building was designed by Isaiah Rogers, who in 1829 had designed the first luxury hotel in the United States, the Tremont House, in Boston. The large four-square block was detailed in the Greek Revival style, faced with pale granite ashlar with quoined corners treated as at Tremont House, as embedded Doric pillars, and a central entrance flanked by Greek Doric columns supporting a short length of entablature.

Astor House contained 309 rooms in five stories, with servant's rooms on the sixth floor, whose mezzanine windows opened in the frieze below the building's cornice. It had gaslights – the gas was produced in the hotel's own plant – and bathing and toilet facilities on each floor, with the water pumped up by steam engines. Its tree-shaded central courtyard was covered over in 1852 by an elliptical vaulted cast-iron and glass "rotunda" designed by James Bogardus, that under the direction of its proprietor "Col." Charles A. Stetson (1837–1877) was the city's most stylish luncheon place for gentlemen. It featured a curving bar, and side dining rooms entered from Vesey Street or Barclay Street. Guests could order from 30 meat and fish dishes offered daily. Although by the 1850s some restaurants allowed men and women to dine together, and others had special ladies' dining room with separate entrances to reserved drawing rooms, the Astor House would not admit unaccompanied women to enter, a policy which prevented prostitutes from nearby brothels from plying their trade in the hotel.

Guests to the hotel could take a horsecar directly there from the Madison Square Depot of the New York and Harlem Railroad.

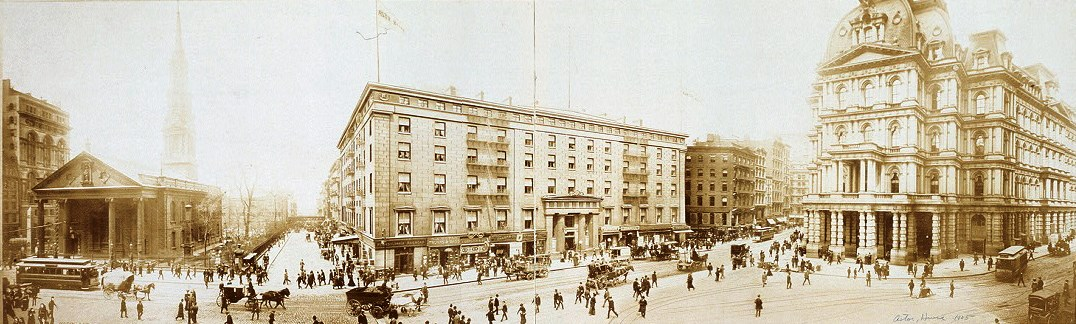
From left to right: St. Paul's Chapel, Astor House, U.S. Post Office, c.1905

== Notable guests and events ==
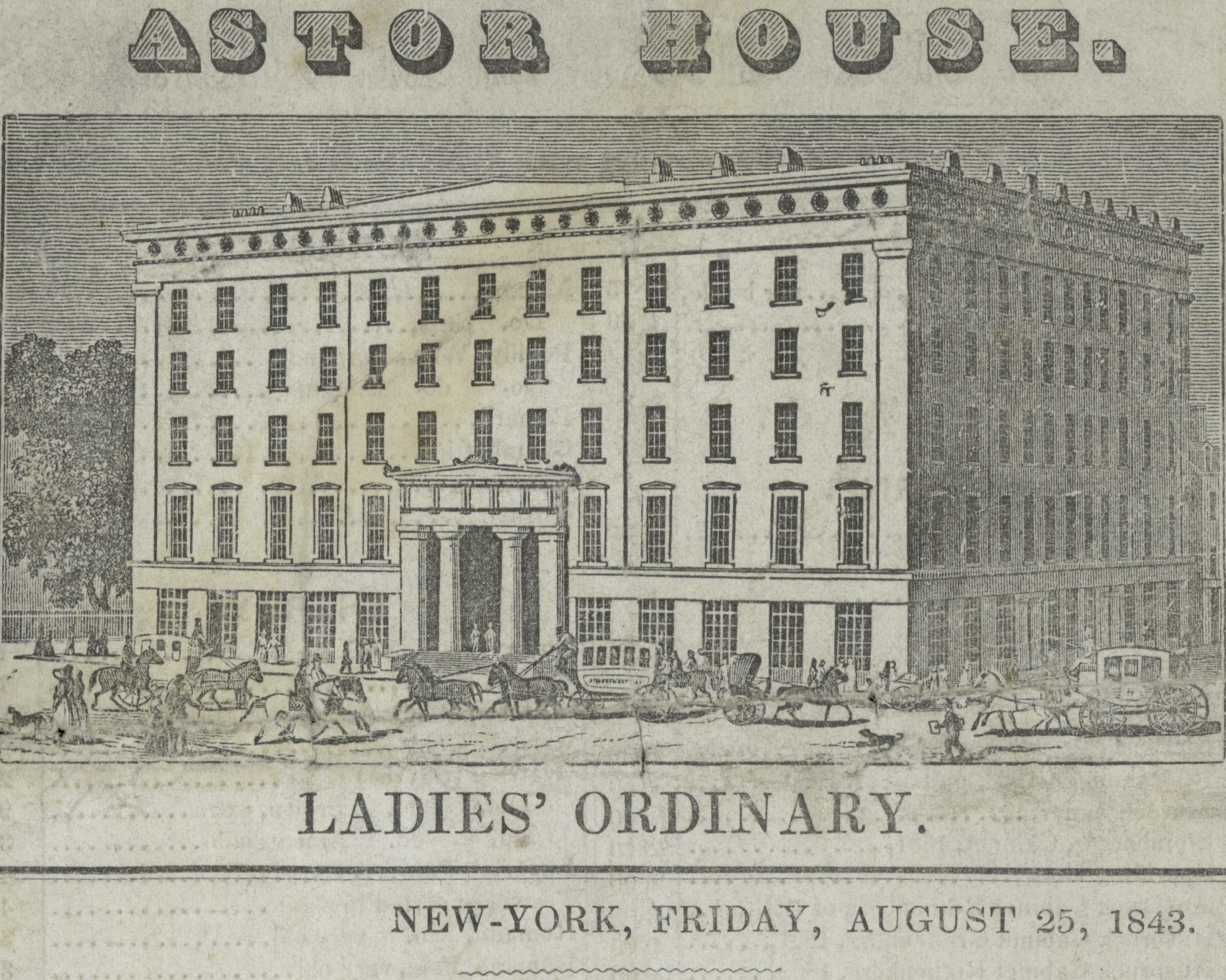
Building art from a BREAKFAST MENU (held by) ASTOR HOUSE (at) LADIES' ORDINARY on Friday, August 25, 1843

For decades, the Astor House was the best known and most prestigious hotel in the country and had an international reputation as the place where renowned literary figures and statesmen met.

Mathew Brady lived there in the 1840s, and William James was born there in 1842. In 1843, the Astor House hosted the recently married Henry Wadsworth Longfellow and his wife. The couple, who renewed their friendship with fellow patron Fanny Kemble, also dined there with Nathaniel Parker Willis and his wife during their stay.

The Norwegian violinist Ole Bull was a returning patron at the hotel on his American tours in the 1840s, 50s, and 60s.

Abraham Lincoln stayed there in February 1861 on his way to his inauguration and gave an impromptu speech, and in 1864 Thurlow Weed ran Lincoln's re-election campaign from the hotel. Afterwards, on November 25, 1864, Confederate sympathizers set fires in 13 major hotels in the city, many of them along Broadway, including the Astor House; the fires were soon put out. American Civil War Confederate Admiral Raphael Semmes stayed at Astor House twice. His first stay was in March 1861, on the eve of the war, when he was searching for ships to buy for the fledgling Confederate Navy. Nearly five years later, on December 27, 1865, he again spent the night, this time as a prisoner of the North, while being escorted to the Washington Navy Yard where Federal authorities would decide whether to put him on trial.

The hotel was used as a safe haven during the Great Blizzard of 1888. On April 5, 1913, the United States Soccer Federation was founded at the hotel.

In 1916, Charles Evans Hughes stayed there while his presidential bid stood in the balance.

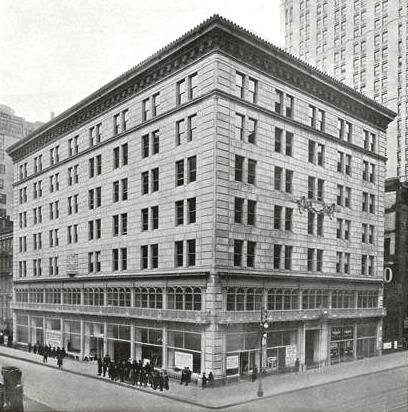
The Astor House Building, designed by Marc Eidlitz & Sons

== Competition and decline ==
The success of the Astor House invited competition. The 1853 St Nicholas Hotel on Broadway at Broome Street was built for $1 million and offered the innovation of central heating that circulated warmed air through registers to every room. It was said to have ended the Astor House's preeminence in New York hostelry. The Metropolitan Hotel, opened in 1852 just north of the St Nicholas at Prince Street, was equally luxurious. But the new hotel to put all others in the shade was the Fifth Avenue Hotel facing Madison Square.

In the face of its competitors, by the early 1870s the Astor House was considered old-fashioned and unappealing, and was principally used by businessmen. Still, it remained such a seemingly permanent fixture of New York, that it was included in a fantasy short story by J. A. Mitchell, The Last American, set in the far future, when Persian explorers in the ruins of New York come upon "an upturned slab" inscribed "Astor House": "I pointed it out to Nofuhl and we bent over it with eager eyes ... 'The inscription is Old English,' he said. '"House" signified a dwelling, but the word "Astor" I know not. It was probably the name of a deity, and here was his temple'".

The south section was demolished in 1913 in order to construct the Vesey Street tunnel for the Broadway subway line, which runs beneath the site; and Bogardus' luncheon pavilion went with it. Vincent Astor redeveloped the site at 217 Broadway as the Astor House Building, a modest seven stories tall, in 1915–1916. The rest was demolished in 1926 and the site rebuilt as the Transportation Building, which was designed by York and Sawyer with Art Deco details.

== See also ==
- List of former hotels in Manhattan
