= Hotel Victoria (New York City) =

Hotel in Manhattan, New York (1877–1914)

Coordinates: 40°44′40″N 73°59′18″W

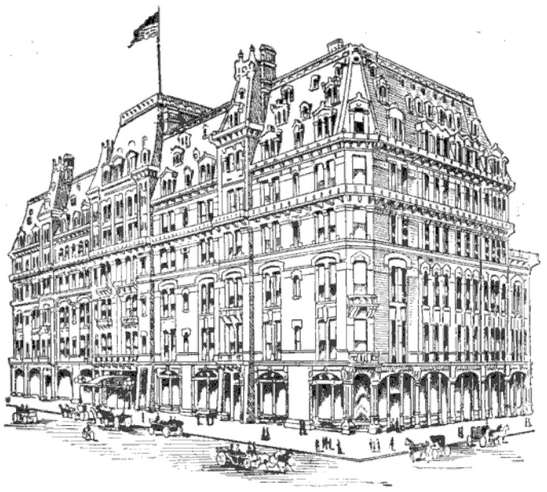
- Interactive map of the Hotel Victoria area

General information
- Location: West 27th Street, Manhattan, New York, U.S.
- Opened: 1877
- Closed: February 26, 1914
- Demolished: 1914

Design and construction
- Architect: Paran Stevens

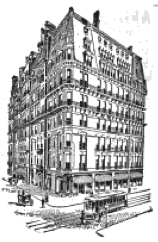
Hotel Victoria

Hotel Victoria was built by Paran Stevens in 1877 in Manhattan, New York City, New York. Occupying the entire block on 27th Street, Broadway and Fifth Avenue, it was the only hotel in the city with entrances on both the latter thoroughfares. The hotel was owned by the American Hotel Victoria Company. George W. Sweeney served as president and Angus Gordon was manager. In 1911, it was announced that the hotel had been redecorated, renovated, and refurnished at a cost of $250,000. Room options included without bath, with bath, and suites with rates ranging between $1.50 and $6.00 per day. Accommodations were available for 500 guests.

The hotel closed its doors on February 26, 1914. The furnishings were sold at auction the same day. The demolition was to make way for an office and loft building on the site after the hotel was torn down.

== Bibliography ==
- International Rotary (January 1911). The Rotarian. Rotary International.
- J. M. O'Connor & Company (1914). American Cloak and Suit Review. Vol. 7 (Public domain ed.). J. M. O'Connor & Company.
