= Howard Hotel (New York City) =

Hotel in Manhattan, New York

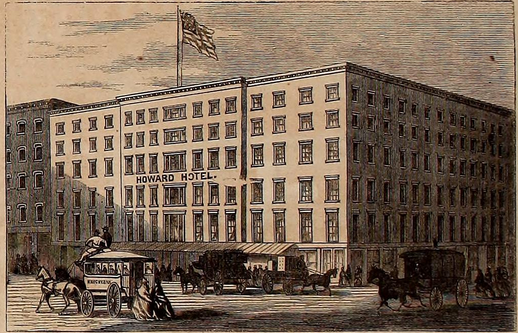
- Howard Hotel in 1864
- Interactive map of the Howard Hotel area

General information
- Location: 176 Broadway, Manhattan, New York City
- Coordinates: 40.7099°N 74.0096°W
- Opened: 1840
- Demolished: 1864

The Howard Hotel, also referred to as Howard's Hotel or the Howard House, was a well-known New York City hotel in the mid-19th century, located in Lower Manhattan at the corner of Broadway and Maiden Lane (176 Broadway).

== History ==
The six-story hotel (161 feet in front and 130 feet deep, with a dining room of 160 by 30 feet) opened in March 1840. Hoteliers Daniel D. Howard and John P. Howard were its early proprietors. They were sons of John Howard, who long operated a hotel in Burlington, Vermont. By the late 1850s, J.E. Kingsley and Ainslee had taken over as proprietors.

U.S. President John Tyler stayed at the hotel on the night of June 25, 1842, the day before his marriage to Julia Gardiner Tyler. The hotel owners locked up the servants to prevent press leaks, so the wedding took the world by surprise.

Later African-American politician Tunis Campbell was the principal waiter at the hotel for some time (at least from 1842–45), and later wrote a well-regarded 1848 guide to hotel management.

The hotel was among those which the "Confederate Army of Manhattan" attempted to burn down in November 1864.

== Demise ==
The building was converted into offices in 1868.

The location of the hotel is now occupied by the Cushman Building (1898) designed by C. P. H. Gilbert on the corner, and the building adjoining it to the north on Broadway.
