= Hotel Manhattan =

Demolished hotel in Manhattan, New York

Coordinates: 40.7532°N 73.9795°W

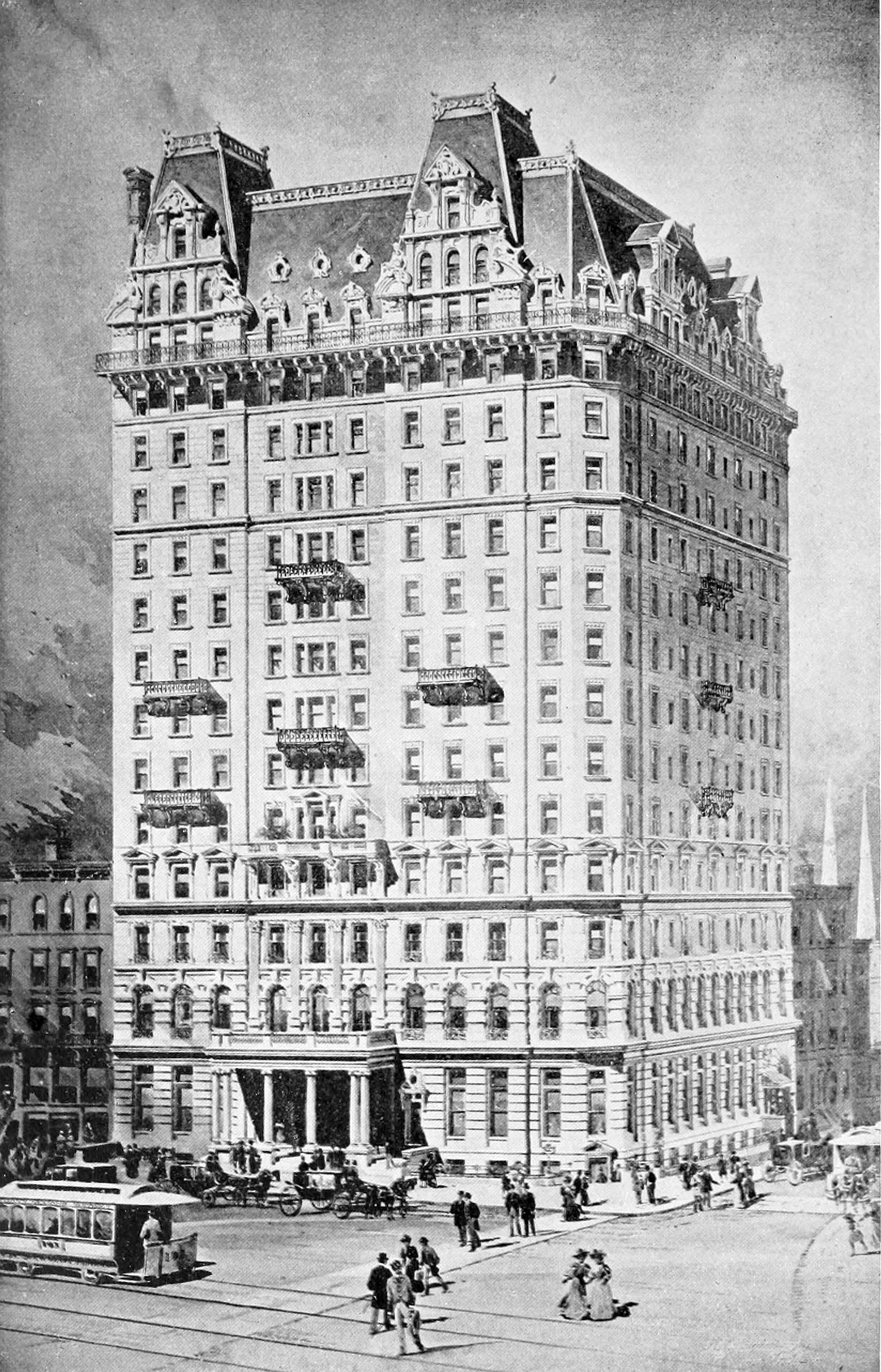
- Hotel Manhattan (1897)
- Interactive map of the Hotel Manhattan area

General information
- Architectural style: Baroque Revival architecture
- Construction started: 1895
- Opened: 1896
- Demolished: 1961

Design and construction
- Architect: Henry Janeway Hardenbergh

Hotel Manhattan (also known as Manhattan Hotel) was a "railroad hotel" on the northwest corner of Madison Avenue and 42nd Street in Manhattan, New York City, New York.

== History ==
Built in 1895–1896, it was to an 1893 design by Henry Janeway Hardenbergh. Standing at 250 feet (76 m), it at one time held the record as "tallest hotel structure in the world". Architectural features included three levels of dormers and a chateauesque roof. It was razed in 1961 to make way for an office tower. Built by Marc Eidlitz & Son, there were 16.5 stories, with 14 stories above the street level. The electrical contractor was C. L. Eidlitz. The fixtures, to a design by Hardenbergh, were manufactured by the Archer Pancoast Company. The hotel was opened under the proprietorship of Hawk & Wetherbee.

In September 1957, the unrelated Hotel Lincoln at 700 Eighth Avenue was remodeled and renamed as the Manhattan Hotel. In 1958, an enormous, illuminated letter "M"—31 feet (9.4 m) feet wide and 12 feet (3.7 m) deep—was added to the roof of the former Hotel Lincoln.

== Architecture and fittings ==
The first floor featured the ladies' dining-room, which measured approximately 2,000 square feet (190 m^{2}), and had six chandeliers. The main foyer, measuring approximately 2,250 square feet (209 m^{2}), had a 16 feet (4.9 m) high ceiling. The main restaurant, measuring approximately 3,500 square feet (330 m^{2}) had a ceiling 20 feet (6.1 m) high. The rotunda, also with a 20 feet (6.1 m) high ceiling, had 3,000 square feet (280 m^{2}) of space and seven chandeliers.
