= Metropolitan Hotel (New York City) =

Hotel in Manhattan, New York (1852–1895)

Coordinates: 40.7245°N 73.9973°W

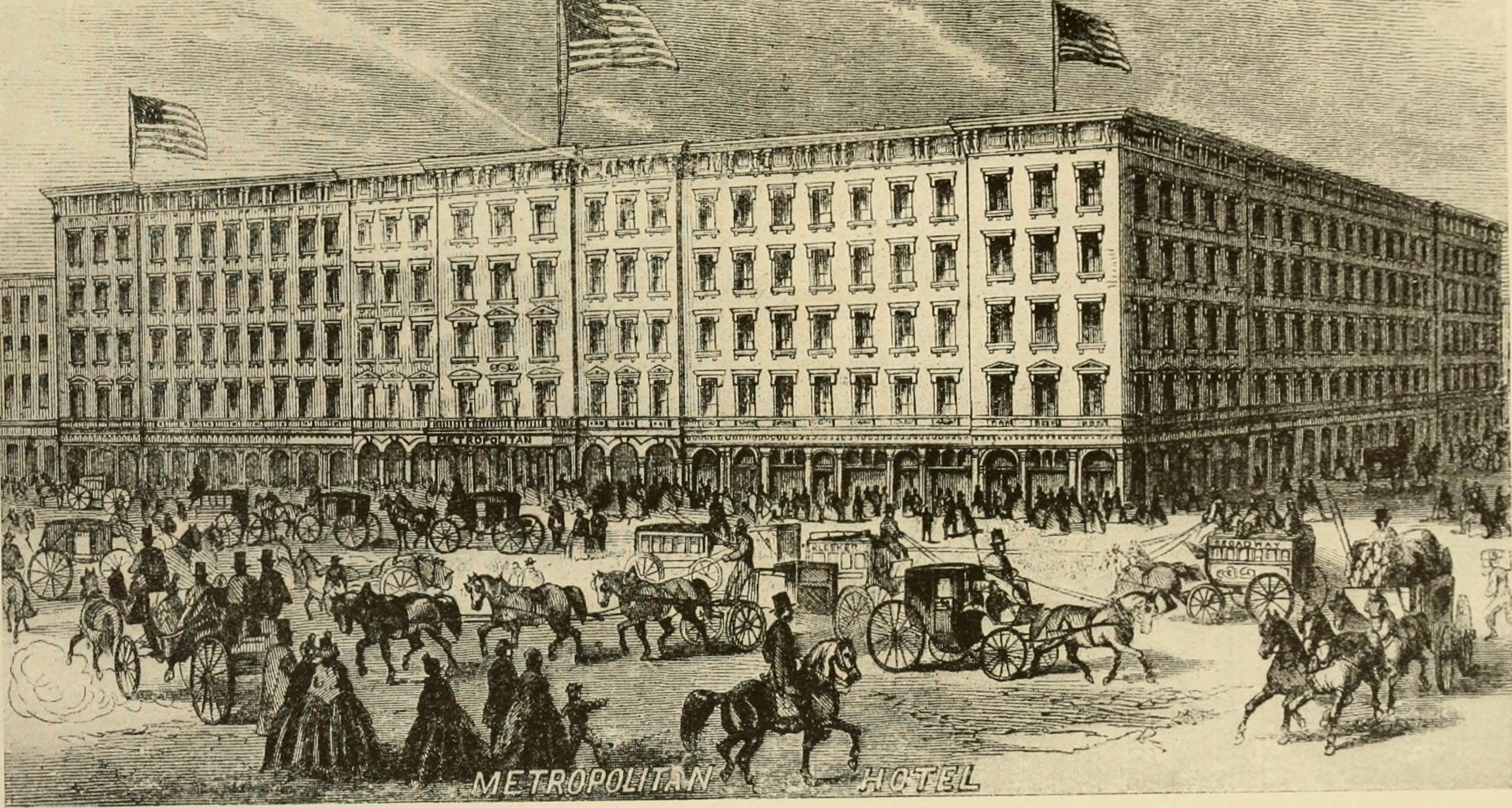

General information
- Status: Demolished
- Opened: September 1, 1852
- Closed: 1895
- Demolished: 1895

The Metropolitan Hotel in Manhattan, New York City, opened September 1, 1852, and was demolished in 1895. It was built at a time of a "hotel boom" in response to the opening of the New York Crystal Palace exhibition of 1853.

It occupied a three-hundred-foot brownstone-faced frontage of four floors above fashionable shopfronts occupying 300 feet on Broadway and 200 feet on Prince Street. The site, which was also that of Niblo's Garden, was owned by Stephen Van Rensselaer, and the architects were Joseph Trench and John Butler Snook, who designed the hotel in the "grand commercialized style reminiscent of Roman palazzos," with many of its furnishings imported from Europe, including the largest plate-glass mirrors in the United States: the interior decorations and furnishings were claimed in 1866 to have cost $200,000. It could shelter six hundred guests, in steam-heated rooms and in "family apartments" with private drawing rooms. The Metropolitan, operated on the "American plan" that included three meals a day, was managed by the Leland brothers, organizers of the first American hotel chain. Unlike many New York hotels, the Metropolitan allowed the slaves of its Southern patrons to stay on the premises. Mary Todd Lincoln and her black seamstress, Elizabeth Keckley stayed at the Metropolitan on various occasions. In 1860, a delegation of Japanese arrived in New York to learn about technological advances and to visit the City. The Lelands hosted them and sought to provide privacy for the unusually attired foreign guests who were hounded by the curious press and public. The Civil War presented the City with an economic downturn, and the Metropolitan's lavish proprietors suffered great economic losses. After 1871, the hotel was for a time managed by Richard Tweed, son of the infamous William M. Tweed ("Boss Tweed"), who became the hotel's proprietor.

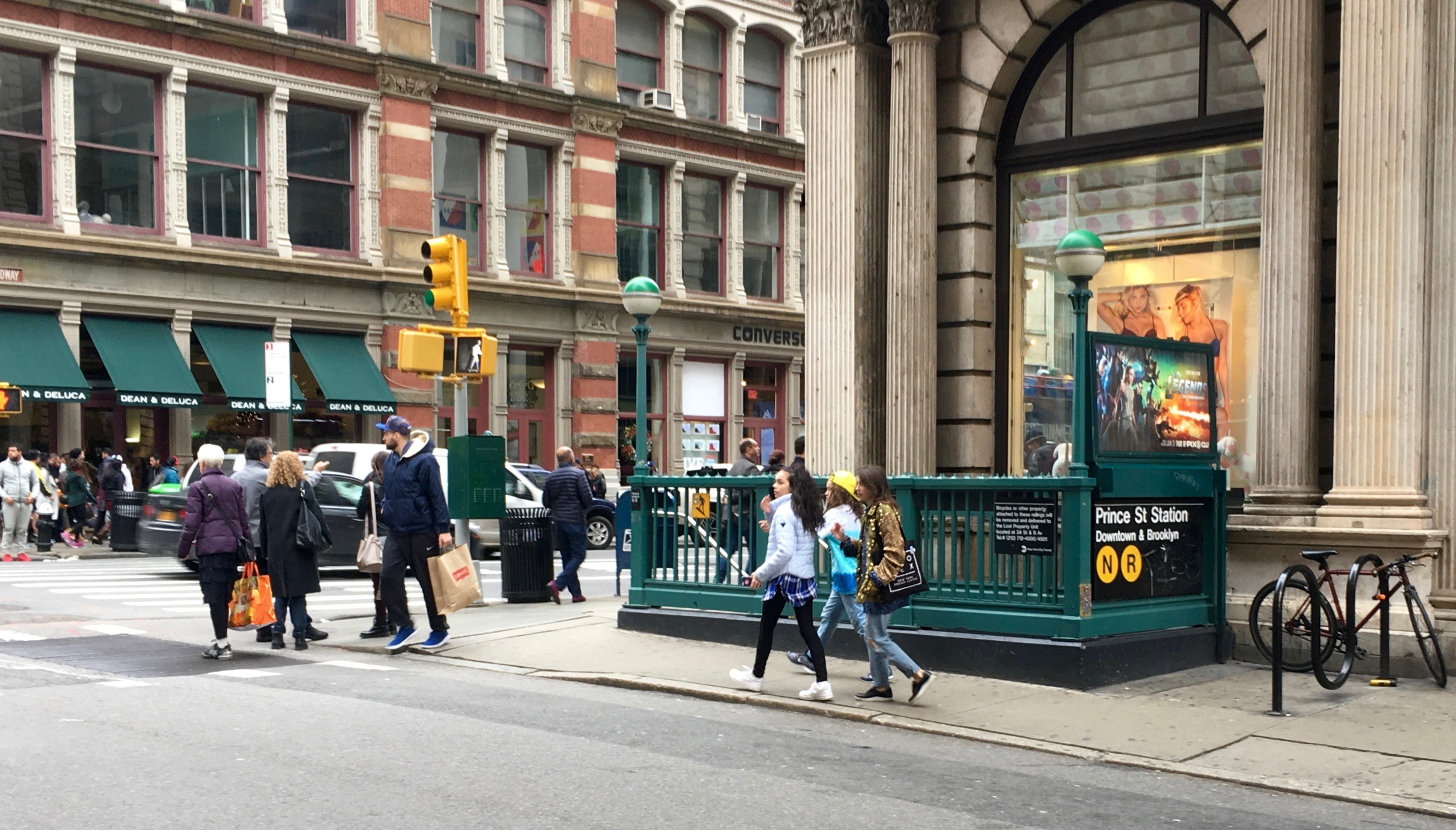
568 Broadway (building that replaced The Metropolitan Hotel) is on the right.

The Metropolitan Hotel closed and was demolished in 1895.

== See also ==
- List of former hotels in Manhattan
