= List of demolished buildings and structures in New York City =

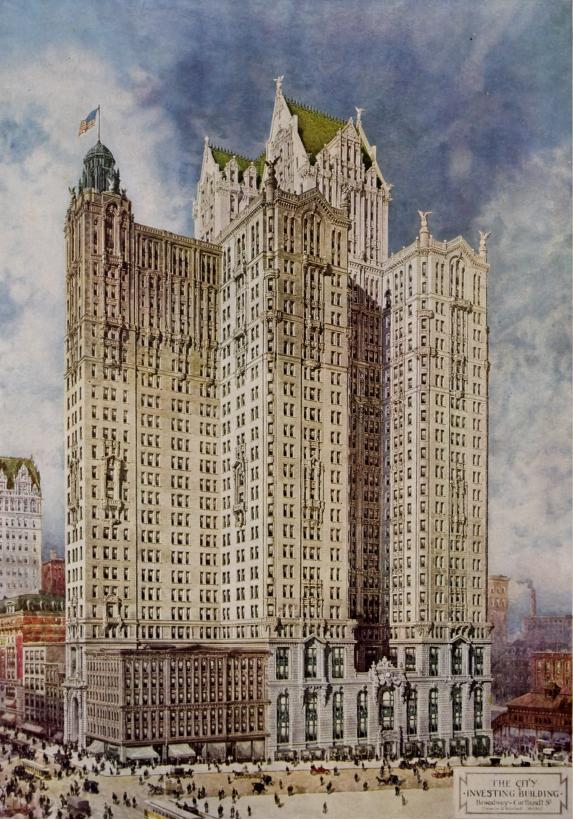
The 486 ft (148 m) tall neo-Romanesque City Investing Building is one of many buildings that can no longer be seen in New York today. It was built between 1906–1908 and was demolished in 1968.

This is a list of demolished buildings and structures in New York City.

The New York City urban area comprises the largest contiguous urban development in the United States, and has a long history of continuous architectural developments and rebuilding. Core to New York City's identity (even by American standards) is constant reinvention, demographic shifts, and architectural redevelopment:

“You are a New Yorker when what was there before is more real and solid than what is here now.” — Colson Whitehead, The Colossus of New York (2003)

Much of the early colonial, Dutch, and pre-industrial NYC heritage was lost in fires, gradual disrepair due to being constructed from wood, or during the implementation of the grid system and Central Park (see Seneca Village). However, it is often colloquially remarked in NYC urbanism circles that more architectural heritage was destroyed in the urban renewal movements of the mid-19th century than when the visigoths sacked Rome.

Black and minority neighborhoods were destroyed en masse for Robert Moses' later highways and suburban arterials to permit white, suburban workers to get to drive to work more easily. Until the historic preservation movement led by activists such as Ada Huxtable began, following the demolition of Penn Station, few recognised the value of historic buildings in the modern city, and developers destroyed buildings at scale. In addition to the noteworthy buildings included on this list, countless Gilded Age mansions were destroyed for high-rise apartment buildings (e.g., Schwab House), particularly south of 59th street (surviving exceptions include the Cooper Hewitt, The Frick, Harry F. Sinclair house, Neue Gallerie, and a few other Museum Mile museums), the only remaining evidence of New Amsterdam is streets layout and naming. Countless historic buildings in the South Bronx were destroyed in the 1970s through arson and insurance fraud.

Despite the historic preservation movement and widely documented negative effects on neighborhoods and city culture that resulted from Moses' destructive redevelopments, gentrification, and demolitions for skyrises, widespread destruction of older buildings for the construction of new buildings remains part of NYC's culture, allowing constant reinvention and redevelopment, particularly for office towers and billionaire luxury housing investments.

== Banks, financial buildings ==
Image	Name	Date built	Date of demolition	Comment
	Brooklyn Savings Bank	1894	1964	
	old New York Cotton Exchange	1885	1922	
	Merchants & Manufacturers Exchange Building	1911	no data available	
	Deutsche Bank Building	1973	2011	Severely damaged in September 11 attacks, eventually demolished as a result.
	Gallatin Bank Building	1887	1929	
	Hanover Bank Building	1903	1931	
	New York Produce Exchange	1884	1958	
	Old New York Produce Exchange	1861	c. 1880	

== Churches ==
=== Synagogues ===
Image	Name	Date built	Date of demolition	Comment
	Temple Emanu-El (I) 56 Chrystie Street.	before 1847	1854 (?)	It used to function as a Baptist church.
	Temple Emanu-El (II) 12th Street	before 1854	1866 (?)	It used to function as a Baptist church.
	Temple Emanu-El (III)	1868	1927	Not confuse with the new Temple Emanu-El (built in 1930).
	Temple Beth-El	1891	1947	
	Synagogue in E63d Street	1873	before 1911	

== Forts ==
Image	Name	Date built	Date of demolition	Comment
	Fort Gansevoort	1812	1854	
	Fort Lafayette	1822	1960	

== Hospitals ==
Image	Name	Date built	Date of demolition	Comment
	St. John's Guild Seaside Hospital	1879	1951	for mothers and children
	Parkchester General Hospital	1941	1978	
	U.S. Army General Hospital No. 1	1917	1919	
	Doctors Hospital	1929	2005	
	Payne Whitney Psychiatric Clinic	early 1900s	1990s	
	Rockefeller War Demonstration Hospital	1917	1919	
	Saint Vincent's Catholic Medical Centers	1849	2010	

== Industrial buildings ==
Image	Name	Date built	Date of demolition	Comment
	5 Pointz	1892	2014	

== Mansions ==
Image	Name	Date built	Date of demolition	Comment
	C. Ledyard Blair House	1914	1927	
	Canterbury Hall	19th century	1861	
	Cornelius Vanderbilt II House	1883	1926	
	Elbridge Gerry Mansion	1897	1929	
	George Blumenthal House	1916	c. 1946	
	George J. Gould House	1906	c. 1963	
	Government House	1790	1815	
	Henry Phipps House	no data available	after 1930	
	Isaac Stern House	before 1910	1949	
	Jacob Ruppert Sr. House	no data available	1925	
	James Speyer House	no data available	1947	
	Jay Gould House	19th century	1906	
	Jerome Mansion	1865	1967	
	Jordan L. Mott House	1880	1936	
	Mrs. O. H. P. Belmont House	1909	1951	
	Mrs. William B. Astor House	1896	1926	
	Ogden Mills House	1887	late 1930s	
	Samuel Osgood House	1770	1856	
	Charles M. Schwab House	1906	1948	
	Sherwood Studio Building	1880	1960	
	Vanderbilt Triple Palace	1882	1947	
	William A. Clark House	1911	1927	
	William C. Whitney House	1880s	1942	
	William K. Vanderbilt House	1882	1927	
	William Salomon House	1906	1924	
	William Ziegler House	1921	after 2008	
	Richmond Hill			

== Museums, exhibition space, libraries ==
Image	Name	Date built	Date of demolition	Comment
	New York Crystal Palace	1853	1858	
	Barnum's American Museum	1841	1868	
	Grand Central Palace	1911	1964	
	Lenox Library	1877	1912	

== Office buildings, tenement houses, skyscrapers ==
Image	Name	Date built	Date of demolition	Comment
	Thomas Jefferson Association Building	1890	1960	
	Liggett Building	1922	2016	
	old (I) Trinity Court Building	1879	1926	Not to be confused with what still stands today Trinity Court Building (III).
	old (II) Trinity Court Building	1927	2015	Not to be confused with what still stands today Trinity Court Building (III).
	Number One Wall Street	1880s/1890s (?)	1928	
	Columbia Building	1890	1930	
	Transit Building	1902	no data available	
	Wolfe Building	1895	1974	
	German American Insurance Building	1908	no data available	
	Union Trust Building	1897	no data available	
	Commercial Cable Company Building	1897	1954	
	Washington Building	1885	no data available	
	Washington Life Building	1898	1969	
	old building in 99 Church Street	1871	c. 1950	
	99 Church Street	1950	2008	
	Union Carbide & Carbon Building	1913	2001	
	Vanderbilt Avenue Building	1913	2016	
	Blair Building	1903	1955	
	City Investing Building	1908	1968	
	Equitable Life Building	1868	1912	
	Gillender Building	1897	1910	
	Harding Building	1910	1927	
	Kaskel and Kaskel Building	1902	2017	
	Kemble Building	1886	1949	
	Manhattan Life Insurance Building	1894	1964	
	Mills Building	1882	1925	
	New York Coliseum	1956	2000	
	New York World Building	1890	1955	
	New York Tribune Building	1875	1966	
	Parker Building	1900	1908	
	Prudence Building	1923	2016	
	Rogers Peet Building	1863	1898	
	Singer Building	1908	1969	
	St. Paul Building	1898	1958	
	Studebaker Building	1902	2004	
	Tenth Street Studio Building	1857	1956	
	Tower Building	1889	1913	
	Union Carbide Building	1960	2021	
	Western Union Telegraph Building	1892	1912	
	World Trade Center	1973	2001	Destroyed in September 11 attacks.
	5 World Trade Center	1970	2001	Severely damaged in September 11 attacks, torn down soon after.
	Fiterman Hall	1959	2009	Damaged by World Trade Center 7, torn down in 2009.

== Operas ==
Image	Name	Date built	Date of demolition	Comment
	Academy of Music	1854	1926	
	Astor Opera House	1847	1890	
	Grand Opera House	1868	1960	
	Harlem Opera House	1889	1959	
	Metropolitan Opera House (39th Street)	1883	1967	

== Prisons ==
Image	Name	Date built	Date of demolition	Comment
	Jefferson Market Prison	1877	1927	
	The Tombs (I)	1838	1902	
	Ludlow Street Jail	1862	1927	
	The Tombs (II)	1902	1941	

== Railway stations ==
Image	Name	Date built	Date of demolition	Comment
	Pelham Bay Naval Training Station	1917	1919	
	Chambers Street Ferry Terminal	1856	1962	
	Cortlandt Street Ferry Depot	no data available	no data available	
	Hudson Terminal	1909	1972	
	Liberty Street Ferry Terminal	1865	1970s	
	26th Street terminal	1857	1869	
	Grand Central Depot	1871	c. 1903	
	Pennsylvania Station	1910	1963	

== Shopping malls ==
Image	Name	Date built	Date of demolition	Comment
	Hylan Plaza	1966	2017	
	Astor Market	1915	1917	
	Frederick Douglass Book Center	1942	1968	
	Gunther Building (Fifth Avenue)	1909	1943	

== Stadiums, sport buildings ==
Image	Name	Date built	Date of demolition	Comment
	Louis Armstrong Stadium (1978–2016)	1978	2016	
	Shea Stadium	1964	2009	
	Yankee Stadium (1923)	1922	2010	
	St. George Cricket Grounds	1886	after 1889	
	Madison Square Garden (I)	1879	1890	
	Madison Square Garden (II)	1890	1926	
	Madison Square Garden (III)	1925	1969	
	Polo Grounds	1890	1963	
	Lewisohn Stadium			

== Theatres ==
Image	Name	Date built	Date of demolition	Comment
	39th Street Theatre	1910	1925	
	44th Street Theatre	1912	1945	
	American Music Hall	1888	1932	
	Apollo Theatre	1920	1996	
	Adelphi Theatre	1928	1970	
	Anthony Street Theatre	1812	1821	
	Astor Theatre	1906	1982	
	Bijou Theatre	1878	1915	
	Bowery Theatre	1845	1929	
	Broadway Theatre	1888	1925	
	Capitol Theatre	1919	1968	
	Casino Theatre	1882	1930	
	Center Theatre	1932	1954	
	Century Theatre	1906	1932	
	Chatham Garden Theatre	1824	1832	
	Chatham Theatre	1839	1862	
	Comedy Theatre	1909	1942	
	Daly's 63rd Street Theatre	1914	1957	
	Daly's Theatre	1867	1920	
	Fifth Avenue Theatre	1868	1939	
	Fourteenth Street Theatre	1866	1938	
	Fulton Theatre	1911	1982	
	Garden Theatre	1890	1925	
	Garrick Theatre	1890	1932	
	Grand Opera House	1868	1960	
	Grand Theatre	1903	1930	
	Herald Square Theatre	1883	1915	
	Hippotheatron	1864	1872	
	John Street Theatre	1767	1798	
	Knickerbocker Theatre	1893	1930	
	Lafayette Theatre	1912	2013	
	Lyceum Theatre	1885	1902	
	Madison Square Theatre	1865	1908	
	Manhattan Theatre	1875	1909	
	Maxine Elliott's Theatre	1908	1960	
	Miner's Bowery Theatre	1878	1929	
	National Theater	1912	1959	
	New Century Theatre	1921	1962	
	New Theatre Comique	1839	1884	
	New York Hippodrome	1905	1939	
	New York Vauxhall Gardens	1767	1859	
	Niblo's Garden	1823	1895	
	Old Broadway Theatre	1847	1859	
	Park Theatre (Brooklyn)	1863	1908	
	Park Theatre (Manhattan)	1798	1848	
	Playhouse Theatre	1911	1969	
	Roxy Theatre	1927	1960	
	Theatre Comique	1862	1881	
	Theatre on Nassau Street	1732	1765	
	Vanderbilt Theatre	1918	1954	
	Wallack's Theatre	1850	1901	
	Winter Garden Theatre	1850	1867	
	Ziegfeld Theatre	1927	1966	

== Villages ==
Image	Name	Date built	Date of demolition	Comment
	New Brighton Village Hall	1871	2004	
	Alexander Macomb House	1788	1940	

== Other buildings ==
Image	Name	Date built	Date of demolition	Comment
	42nd Street Airlines Terminal	1941	1978	
	Central Park Casino	1862	1936	
	Federal Hall	1703	1812	
	Pearl Street Station	before 1882	1890	
	The Rotunda	1818	1870	
	Tontine Coffee House	1793	1905	
	old New York City Criminal Courts Building	1893	1941	
	City Hall Post Office and Courthouse			

== Other structures ==
Image	Name	Date built	Date of demolition	Comment
	Dewey Arch	1899	1900	
	Latting Observatory	1853	1856	
	Lincoln Arcade	1903	1960	
	Macombs Dam	c. 1814	c. 1858	
	Putnam Bridge	1881	1958	

== Literature ==
- Nathan Silver: Lost New York, Rare Book Cellar, 1967, First Edition; Third Printing, ISBN 9780517167038
- Kathrens, Michael C. (2005). Great Houses of New York, 1880-1930. New York: Acanthus Press. p. 257. ISBN 978-0-926494-34-3.

== Related pages ==
- List of tallest voluntarily demolished buildings
- Architecture of New York City
- Early skyscrapers

== Other links ==
- https://www.bygonely.com/new-york-city-demolished-buildings-landmarks/
- curbed.com
- Article title
- https://www.businessinsider.com/demolished-new-york-buildings-2014-9
- https://www.mentalfloss.com/article/63413/15-new-york-citys-lost-landmarks
- https://hu.pinterest.com/gerrygouy/demolished-new-york/
- http://stuffnobodycaresabout.com/2015/06/10/20-historic-buildings-that-were-demolished/
