= George Jarkesy =

American hedge fund manager and fraudster

- Born: 1974 (age 51–52)
- Occupations: Hedge fund manager Conservative talk radio host
- Organization: Patriot28

George Jarkesy (born August 1974) is an American hedge fund manager, media commentator, and conservative talk radio host. He gained prominence through his investment activities and media presence but faced legal challenges related to securities fraud.

== Career ==
George Jarkesy began his career in the mid-1990s in the financial services industry as a broker with an institutional group at a New York Stock Exchange member firm. He identified investment opportunities, particularly in biotechnology and gaming, which allowed him to transition into investment management.

By the late 1990s, Jarkesy had shifted from brokerage to direct investment, establishing his own firm that specialized in providing bridge loans to small public companies in need of financial restructuring, balance sheet cleanup, or pre-IPO funding. His firm quickly gained traction, with mid-tier and small investment banks referring clients who required capital infusions.

Over the years, Jarkesy expanded his investment portfolio, funding companies across various industries, including riverboat gaming, biotechnology, U.S. oil, gas, coal, Canadian oil sands, uranium mining, light steel manufacturing, wine vineyards, cattle operations, fast food franchises, marinas, and multifamily housing developments. He also co-founded two biotechnology firms, Adventrix (now known as SpectraScience Inc.) and Opexa Therapeutics Inc., which focused on personalized stem cell therapies.

== Media Presence ==
Beyond his investment ventures, Jarkesy became known as a conservative talk radio host, leading The George Jarkesy Radio Show. He frequently appeared on financial news programs, including Fox Business Network and CNBC, discussing economic trends and policy.

The George Jarkesy Show launched on January 9, 2012 and was a nationally syndicated conservative talk radio program focused on business, economics, and politics. The show aired on multiple stations across the United States, including Houston, Dallas, San Francisco, Minneapolis, Seattle, Atlanta, and Boston, and featured notable guests such as U.S. Rep. Allen West, economist Thomas Sowell, and Apollo 7 astronaut Walt Cunningham. Jarkesy was also a frequent guest on Fox Business News, Fox & Friends, and CNBC, providing market commentary and investment insights.

Jarkesy has written columns and op-eds for several publications, including Townhall, Business Insider, The Baltimore Sun and others.

== National Eagles and Angels Association ==
Alongside his financial and media pursuits, Jarkesy served as chairman of the National Eagles and Angels Association (NEAA), a nationwide investment network that connected individual investors with early-stage companies. Through this platform, he aimed to provide strategic guidance to emerging entrepreneurs while fostering a collaborative investment community.

== Legal issues ==
On March 22, 2013, the U.S. Securities and Exchange Commission (SEC) charged Jarkesy with securities fraud. According to the SEC, Jarkesy and his business associate, Anastasios "Tommy" Belesis, founder of John Thomas Financial Inc., misled investors by inflating the value of fund assets and steering excessive fees to Belesis' brokerage firm. The SEC’s investigation revealed that Jarkesy had raised two hedge funds between 2007 and 2009, accumulating approximately $30 million from 120 investors.

The SEC alleged that Jarkesy and Belesis falsely portrayed the funds as independent while secretly channeling fees and inflated valuations to benefit their own financial interests. Jarkesy was accused of hiring stock promoters to artificially boost the price of shares held by the funds, manipulating financial disclosures, and misleading investors about the nature and performance of their investments. The SEC’s New York Regional Director, Andrew Calamari, stated that "Jarkesy disregarded the basic standards to which all fund managers are held," emphasizing that he had "falsified valuations and deceived investors". An administrative law judge found Jarkesy liable, imposing a $300,000 civil penalty and other sanctions.

Jarkesy challenged the SEC's proceedings, arguing that the in-house adjudication violated his constitutional rights. In May 2023, the U.S. Fifth Circuit Court of Appeals sided with Jarkesy, ruling that the use of internal hearings before an administrative law judge was a violation of the Seventh Amendment. The U.S. Supreme Court agreed to review the opinion from the Fifth Circuit and heard arguments on the matter on November 29, 2023. On Jun 27, 2024 The U.S. Supreme Court ruled in agreement with the Fifth Circuit.

The Supreme Court's ruling in SEC v. Jarkesy has significant implications for federal agencies' enforcement practices. It restricts the SEC's ability to use in-house tribunals for civil penalty cases, mandating that such actions be brought in federal court where defendants are entitled to a jury trial. This decision may influence how other agencies conduct enforcement proceedings, potentially limiting their use of internal administrative processes.
