= Bankers Trust Building =

Bankers Trust Building can refer to one of several New York City skyscrapers owned by the Bankers Trust, a financial institution acquired by Deutsche Bank in 1998:

- 14 Wall Street – the original, extant Bankers Trust Building erected in 1912 and expanded in 1933
- The Deutsche Bank Building, originally The Bankers Trust building located at 130 Liberty Street, erected in 1974 and heavily damaged in the September 11 attacks, which has since been deconstructed.
- 280 Park Avenue – designed by Henry Dreyfuss and completed in 1963
- 80 Eighth Avenue – Neo-Gothic building completed in 1929, originally known as Bankers Trust Company Building
