= Alexander Rovt =

Carpathian–American businessman

- Born: Alexander Rovt; 1952 (age 73–74); Soviet Union
- Education: Doctorate Lviv Academy of Commerce
- Spouse: Olga Rovt
- Children: Philip; Maxwell

Alexander Rovt (born as Sándor Róth, July 23, 1952) is an American billionaire businessman and real estate investor who made his fortune in the trade and manufacture of fertilizer in the former Soviet Union. He identifies as Carpathian.

== Early life and education ==
Rovt was born to an observant Jewish family in Mukachevo, Carpathia which is now part of Ukraine. His father was a manager at a knitting factory and his mother a housewife. He grew up across the nearby border in Hungary and then attended the Lviv Academy of Commerce in Ukraine where he graduated with a degree in business and later received a PhD in international economics. After school, he worked as a manager for the state-owned vegetable distributor in Hungary but was soon arrested due to his capitalistic business tendencies; in 1985, he fled to the United States with his wife and settled in Brooklyn where he worked in his uncle’s kosher deli and at a cousin’s jewelry store.

== Career ==
In 1988, Rovt took a job at IBE Trade which was founded by Sheldon Silverston. IBE made a profit by selling goods to governments that were not in favor with the international community and as a result, did not have ready access to hard currency. IBE was paid in hard commodities rather than cash (e.g. steel, coffee). Thanks to Rovt’s connections in the Eastern bloc and understanding of the fertilizer business thanks to his involvement at the vegetable distributor, IBE expanded it operations to the Soviet Union supplying goods in exchange for fertilizer, something the Soviets had in abundance thanks to ample natural gas supplies, a primary input to the manufacture of fertilizer. Once Perestroika took hold, the barter business diminished and Rovt (along with his childhood friend and co-worker at IBE, Imre Pákh) bought IBE from Silverston and transitioned the company into a traditional fertilizer distributor eventually controlling 85-90% of the fertilizer trade in Russia and Ukraine by 2000.

In 1999, Rovt purchased a deteriorating fertilizer plant in Bulgaria on the condition that he spend $100 million over five years on renovations. The company was losing money due to high natural gas prices which were then trading at market prices. Rovt sold a 25% stake in the company to the Itera associated energy billionaire Igor Makarov from Turkmenistan who agreed to supply the plant with natural gas at discounted price. (Note: Vladimir Makeev (Russian: Владимир Павлович Макеев; born 1948, Moscow) is closely associated with Igor Makarov.) He also sold 10% to local Bulgarian partners. Unbeknownst to him, his Bulgarian partners were able to seize control of the facility by transferring ownership of the plant to an offshore company in Cyprus. His friend and partner Pákh sold his interest in IBE to Rovt after one of his Bulgarian partners was murdered. Rovt sued in the US to recover his plant and received a favorable decision but the judgment was not honored in Bulgaria.

Despite his unfavorable foray into fertilizer plant ownership in Bulgaria, he purchased several more fertilizer plants in the 2000s which both became very lucrative investments. The first was in Rossosh, Russia in partnership with Igor Olshansky, the son of a member of the Duma (in whose district the plant was located) and the Norwegian agricultural company Yara International. In 2004, IBE purchased a plant in Severodonetsk, Ukraine in return for an investment commitment of $120 million. In 2005, after the Orange Revolution, a court voided the sale; Rovt, with the assistance of the US government, was eventually able to have the decision reversed and the plant is operating profitably with the consent of the Ukrainian government.

In 2007, wanting to secure his wealth, he purchased the Bankers Trust Building from Joshua Zamir for $303 million in cash and sold his remaining overseas fertilizer assets to Ukrainian billionaire Dmitry Firtash. He now has a portfolio of 280 buildings mostly in New York City.

Rovt is a conservative investor. He invests for the long term and does not believe in deficit borrowing.

== Public service and political donations ==
Rovt served on the NYC Board of Corrections as Vice Chairman and is a trustee of the John Jay College of Criminal Justice. He serves as the chairman of the board of the Brookdale University Hospital and Medical Center. He has donated to the campaigns of Andrew Cuomo and Anthony Weiner. Rovt has endowed a school for Orthodox immigrants, the Zvi Dov Roth Academy in Brooklyn. The school is named after his grandfather who was killed in the Holocaust. Rovt and his wife Olga Rovt gave the maximum $3,850 to the campaign of Eric L. Adams when he ran for Brooklyn Borough President in 2017 and 2013. Rovt and his son Maxwell are planning to donate to Mayor Adams reelection campaign for New York City mayor in 2025. ROvt did not donate to Eric Adams' mayoral campaign in 2020.

== Personal life ==
He lives on Manhattan’s Upper East Side with his wife Olga in a five-story, 12,000-square-foot building constructed out of reinforced concrete with brick facing and retractable bulletproof shades covering the windows. He has two children: Philip (born 1978) and Maxwell (born 1987).

== Distinctions ==
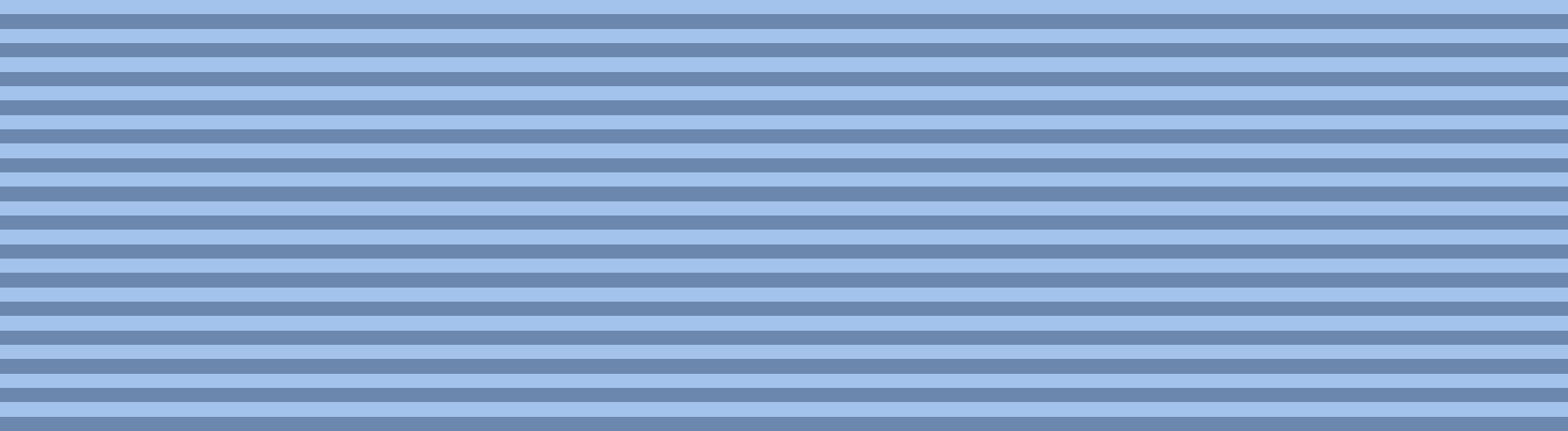
- Order of Prince Yaroslav the Wise, 5th Class (August 22, 2016).
- Order of Prince Yaroslav the Wise, 4th Class (August 23, 2019)
