= Jay Gould House =

Demolished mansion in Manhattan, New York

Coordinates: 40°46′10″N 73°58′09″W

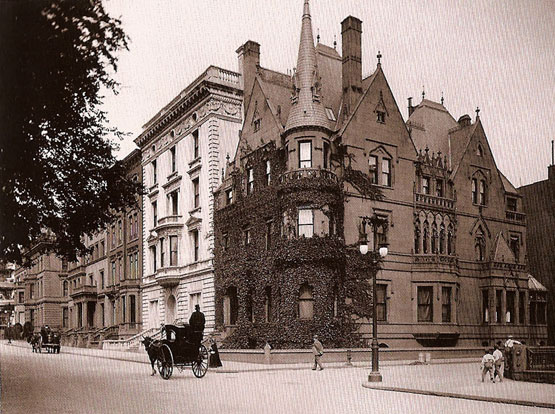
- The Jay Gould House, with the Isaac Stern House to its left
- Interactive map of the Jay Gould House area

General information
- Architectural style: Neo-Gothic
- Demolished: 1906

The Jay Gould House was a mansion located at 857 Fifth Avenue at East 67th Street, on the Upper East Side of Manhattan, New York City.

== History ==
The home was constructed in the French Neo-Gothic style for financier Jay Gould, who later gave it to his eldest son, George Jay Gould. The younger Gould tore down the mansion in 1906, and he had the George J. Gould House built in its place.
