= John Thomas Financial =

- Industry: Independent Broker-dealer/Wealth Management
- Founded: 2007; 19 years ago
- Founder: Thomas Belesis, CEO and President
- Defunct: July 2013; 12 years ago
- Headquarters: 14 Wall Street; New York City, U.S.
- Area served: Worldwide
- Products: Financial services
- Number of employees: Almost 200

John Thomas Financial was a privately held financial services firm located in the Financial District of New York City. It closed in July 2013 after its founder, Anastasios "Thomas" Belesis was sued by the Securities and Exchange Commission for deceiving investors.

In 2009, John Thomas Financial moved its offices into 14 Wall Street, where it occupied the entire 23rd floor. The firm was founded in 2007 by Thomas Belesis, who was CEO. Initially a three-person brokerage, it grew to 200 representatives and staff providing retail brokerage, investment banking and corporate advisory services. It also added a private wealth management affiliate.

In addition to its retail brokerage services, the firm raised convertible debt for startups and new companies.

== Leadership ==
The company President and CEO was Thomas Belesis, a frequent contributor to financial news shows. He played a role in the movie Wall Street: Money Never Sleeps which was partly filmed at John Thomas Financial. Belesis used his media exposure to support the image of Wall Street, launching rallies and a website, to improve the image of stock traders.

== Controversy ==
The New York Post looked into the "shady" past of Thomas Belesis in an April 2012 article. In early 2013, another series of New York Post articles covered an investigation by the Financial Industry Regulatory Authority (FINRA) into the dealings of John Thomas Financial. The articles reported on Belesis being served with a Wells notice, and the potential for the investigation to result in prosecution. Bloomberg L.P. interviewed former employees and questioned whether the business practices and sales tactics of John Thomas Financial constituted those of a boiler room.

John Thomas Financial and Belesis were barred from the securities industry by FINRA in April 2015 "based on findings that the firm and Belesis traded ahead of customer orders, and failed to immediately thereafter fill the orders at the same or a better price than the one obtained by the firm. The findings stated that the firm and Belesis failed to maintain accurate and complete books and records by failing to preserve customer order tickets. The findings also stated that Belesis provided false and misleading information to FINRA in sworn investigative testimony."
