= Trinity Court Building =

Office skyscraper in Manhattan, New York

76 Trinity
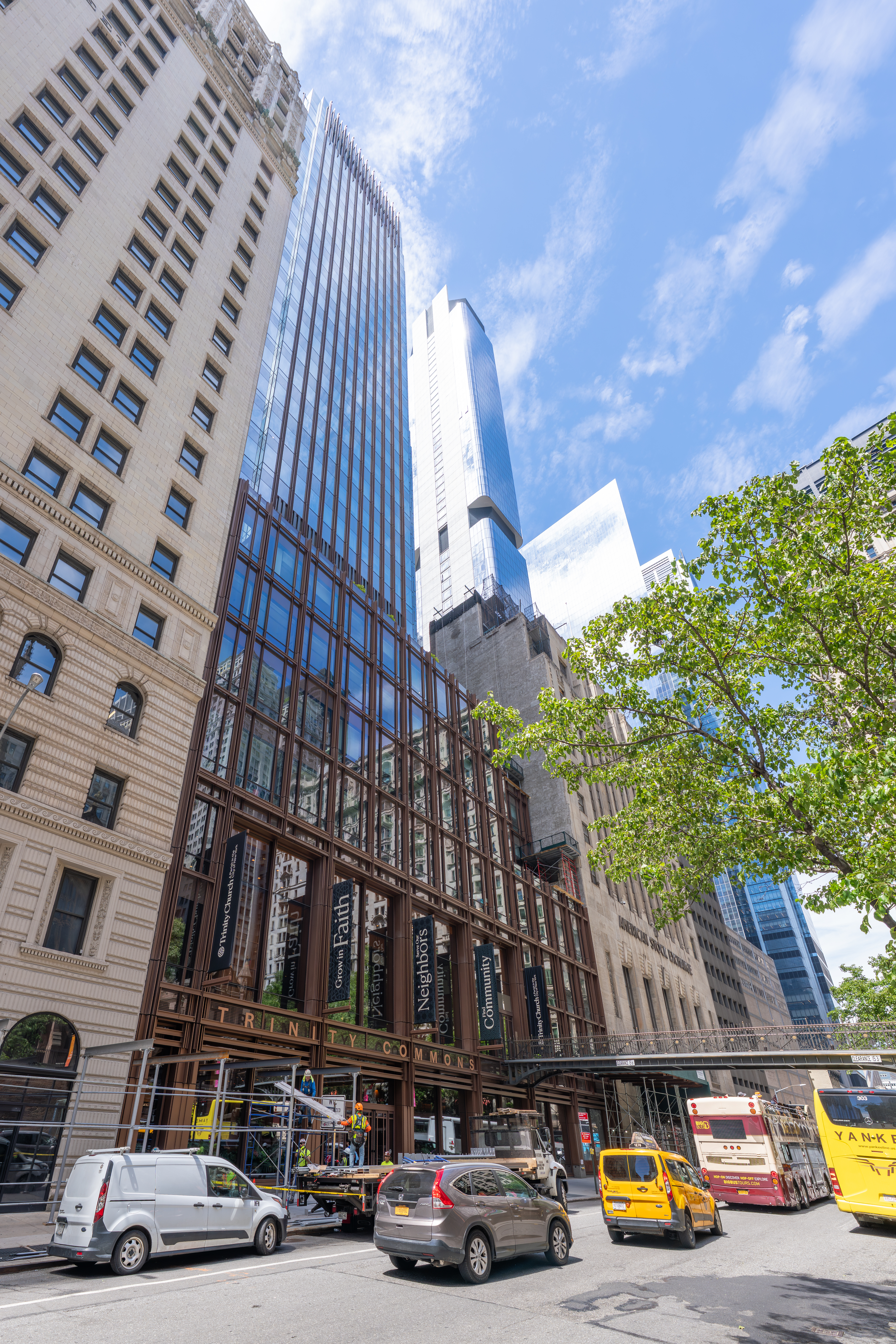
- 76 Trinity (2026)
- Interactive map of the 76 Trinity area
- Alternative names: Trinity Court Building

General information
- Location: 76 Trinity Place; Financial District, Manhattan, New York
- Coordinates: 40°42′31″N 74°00′46″W
- Construction started: 2017
- Estimated completion: 2019
- Opened: 2021

Technical details
- Floor count: 26

Trinity Court Building, also known as Trinity Commons, is a structure at 68–76 Trinity Place, between Rector and Albany Streets, in the Financial District of Lower Manhattan in New York City. It replaces a building on the site with the same name, constructed in 1927. The 1927 building, in turn, had been erected to replace a structure built in 1879.

Trinity Church, which owns the site, had its offices and preschool in the 1927 building. In 2015, the church faced a choice of a $33 million renovation to bring it up to code, or to replace it with a new building at a cost of about $35 million. The vestry decided on the latter and tore the structure down. In its place, it planned to construct a new building with an address of 68-74 Trinity Place.

Originally, 310,000 square feet (29,000 m^{2}) of primarily luxury condominiums with a modern glass facade was planned. Due to community opposition the plans were changed, with a smaller commercial building incorporating community-friendly uses. The new design also uses bronzed aluminum to better fit in with the church and a preserved footbridge from the previous building, and incorporates stained glass and terra cotta embellishments salvaged form the 1927 edifice. The third building, known as Trinity Commons, topped out in 2018 and opened in 2021.
