= Hanover Bank Building =

- Interactive map of the Hanover Bank Building area

General information
- Status: Demolished
- Architectural style: Neoclassical architecture
- Location: New York City
- Coordinates: 40.7078°N 74.0105°W
- Construction started: 1901
- Construction stopped: 1903
- Demolished: 1931

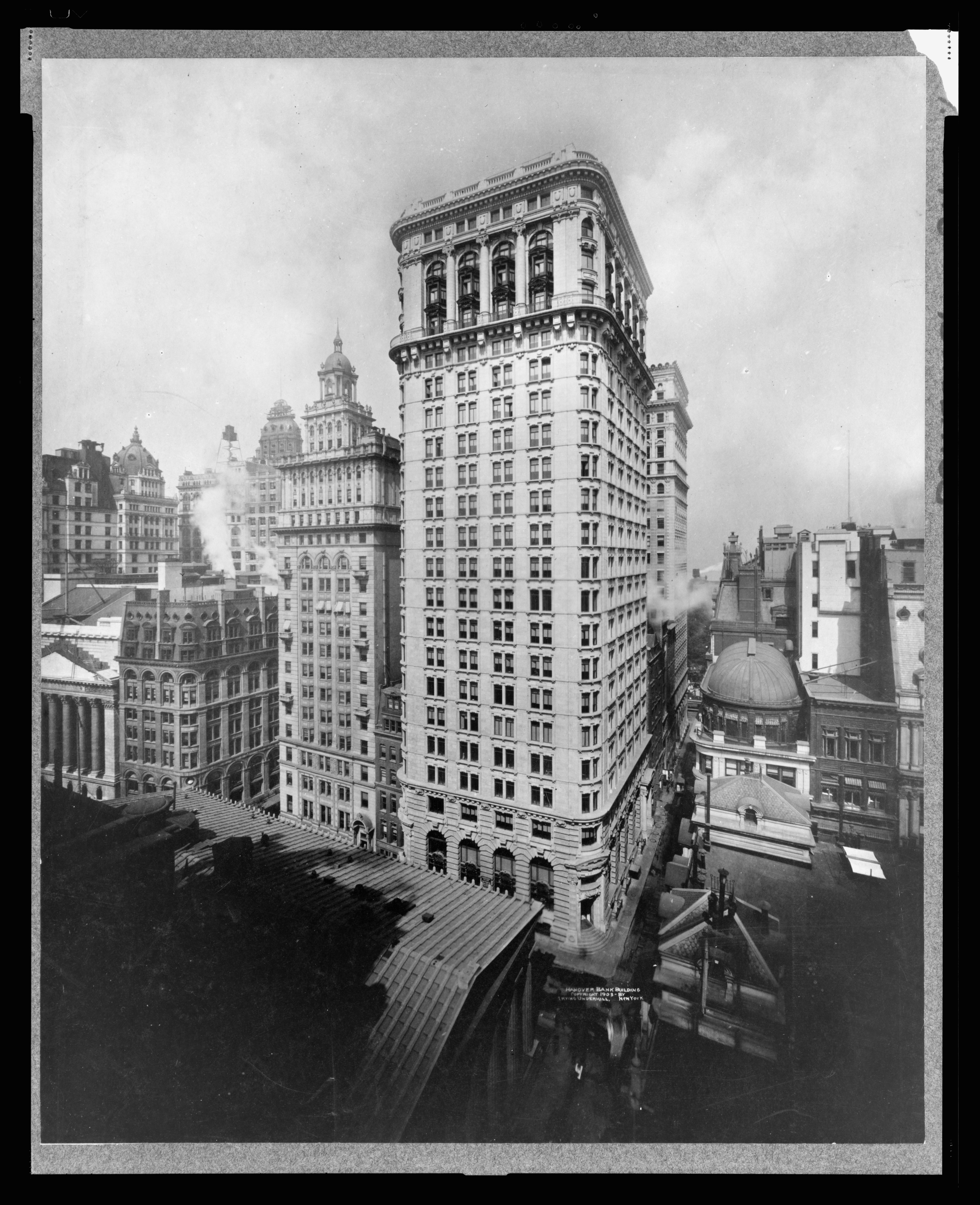
The Hanover Bank Building, in 1903, towering over the Gillender building to its left.

The Hanover Bank Building or Hanover National Bank Building was an early skyscraper at the southwest corner of Pine Street and Nassau Street in Lower Manhattan, New York City. It was built in 1901-1903 and demolished in 1931.

== History ==
Construction of the Hanover Bank Building began in 1901 and was completed in 1903. It had 22 floors and was 385 feet (117 m) tall. It was next to the Banker's Trust Building on 14 Wall Street. The building, like many of its contemporaries, was built in neoclassical style, richly decorated.

Bankers Trust acquired the building in 1929, and it was demolished in 1931 to make way for the expansion of 14 Wall.
