= 14 Wall Street =

Office skyscraper in Manhattan, New York

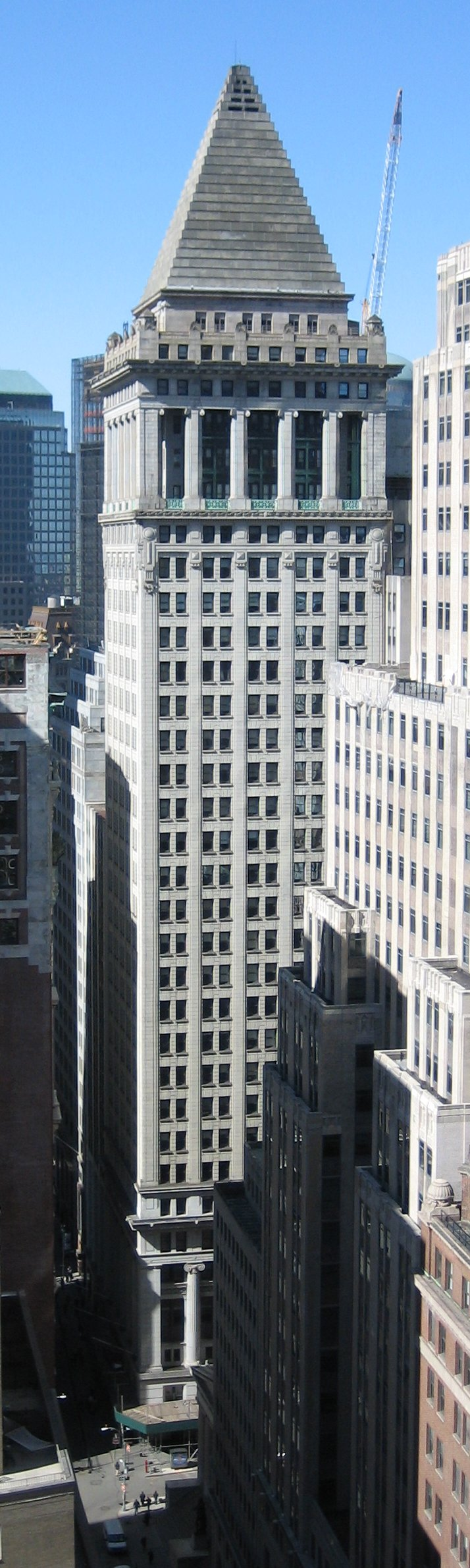
- Former names: Bankers Trust Company Building

General information
- Status: Completed
- Type: Office
- Architectural style: Neoclassical
- Location: 8–20 Wall Street; Manhattan, New York 10005; U.S.
- Coordinates: 40°42′27″N 74°00′39″W
- Construction started: 1910
- Completed: 1912
- Opening: May 20, 1912
- Renovated: 1931–1933
- Owner: 14 Wall Street Holdings

Height
- Height: 540 ft (160 m)

Technical details
- Floor count: 32 (+7 attic) (Note: The second story was initially outfitted with a double-height ceiling. The original third floor is now the fourth story; the current third story was created in 1933 during the building's expansion. In this article, the "third story" refers to the upper level created when the second story was divided into lower and upper portions.)
- Floor area: 1,100,000 square feet (100,000 m^{2})
- Lifts/elevators: 34

Design and construction
- Architect: Trowbridge & Livingston
- Developer: Bankers Trust
- Main contractor: Marc Eidlitz & Son

Renovating team
- Architect: Shreve, Lamb & Harmon

New York City Landmark
- Designated: January 14, 1997
- Reference no.: 1949

U.S. Historic district – Contributing property
- Designated: February 20, 2007
- Part of: Wall Street Historic District
- Reference no.: 07000063

14 Wall Street, originally the Bankers Trust Company Building, is a skyscraper at the intersection of Wall Street and Nassau Street in the Financial District of Manhattan in New York City. The building is 540 feet (160 m) tall, with 32 usable floors. (Note: Emporis claims that this building has 29 stories beneath its roof, but contemporary sources cite this building as having 32 stories. Several other sources cite the building as having 41 stories in total, although these sources do not specify the floor count of the roof or the main tower. Further complicating the issue, the current third story was created when the building was renovated in 1931–1933; prior to this, 14 Wall Street was considered to have 31 stories.) The original 540-foot tower is at the southeastern corner of the site, and a shorter annex wraps around the original tower.

The original tower was erected on the site of the Stevens Building at 12–14 Wall Street and the Gillender Building at 16 Wall Street. It was built in 1910–1912 and was designed by Trowbridge & Livingston in the neoclassical style as the headquarters for Bankers Trust. A 25-story addition with Art Deco detailing, designed by Shreve, Lamb & Harmon, was constructed in 1931–1933 to replace three other structures. After new buildings for Bankers Trust were erected in 1962 and 1974, the company moved employees away from 14 Wall Street, and eventually sold the building in 1987.

14 Wall Street's tower incorporates a seven-story pyramidal roof inspired by the Mausoleum at Halicarnassus. The interior of the building contained numerous amenities that were considered state-of-the-art at the time of its construction; the first three floors were used as Bankers Trust's headquarters, while the rest were rented to tenants. A notable building in Manhattan's skyline in the early 20th century, the building was featured prominently in Bankers Trust's early imagery. The building was designated a New York City landmark in 1997. It is also a contributing property to the Wall Street Historic District, a National Register of Historic Places district created in 2007.

== Site ==
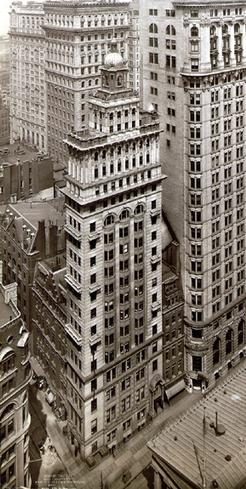
The Gillender Building (left) and Hanover National Building (right) previously occupied the site of 14 Wall Street.

14 Wall Street is in the Financial District of Manhattan, bounded by Nassau Street to the east, Wall Street to the south, and Pine Street to the north. The lot has dimensions of 160 feet (49 m) on Wall Street, 173 feet (53 m) on Nassau Street, and 178 feet (54 m) on Pine Street. The lot has a total area of 32,947 square feet (3,060.9 m^{2}). Nearby buildings include the Equitable Building to the north, Federal Hall National Memorial (formerly the sub-Treasury building) at 26 Wall Street to the east, 23 Wall Street to the southeast, the New York Stock Exchange Building to the south, 1 Wall Street to the southwest, and 100 Broadway to the west. An entrance to the Broad Street station of the New York City Subway, serving the J and Z trains, is directly to the southeast.

The original building is located at the southeast corner of the site, which was previously occupied by the Stevens and Gillender buildings. In 1880, the Sampson family developed their lots along 12–14 Wall Street into the Stevens Building, which stood until 1910. Sixteen years later, Helen L. Gillender Asinari, owner of the adjoining six-story office building on the northeast corner of Wall and Nassau Streets, decided to replace it with the 300-foot-tall (91 m), 20-story Gillender Building, which was completed in 1897 and demolished in 1910. The two lots, combined, had a nearly square footprint measuring about 100 by 100 feet (30 by 30 m). (Note: The New York Times reported that the two buildings occupied a site measuring 94 feet (29 m) on Wall Street and 102 feet (31 m) on Nassau Street. The New York City Landmarks Preservation Commission states that the site measures 97 feet (30 m) on Wall Street and 94 feet (29 m) on Nassau Street.)

The annex occupies the remainder of the plot and is L-shaped in plan. Prior to the construction of the annex, the land below it was occupied by three buildings. The seven-story Astor Building was located at 10–12 Wall Street, directly to the west of the original tower. The Hanover National Building at 5–11 Nassau Street, erected in 1903, was a 21-story building north of the original Bankers Trust Building, which extended to Pine Street. The final building on the lot was 7 Pine Street, a 10-story building to the northwest of the original tower.

== Architecture ==
14 Wall Street is approximately 540 feet (160 m) tall, with 32 usable above-ground floors and a seven-story pyramidal roof at its top, which contains seven storage levels. In addition, 14 Wall Street contains four basement levels; the topmost basement is partially raised above ground level. The original structure was designed by Trowbridge & Livingston for Bankers Trust and was built between 1910 and 1912. An addition to the north and west was designed by Shreve, Lamb & Harmon and constructed between 1931 and 1933. This addition is about 325 feet (99 m) tall.

14 Wall Street's "granite-clad roof and its specifically Greek architectural motifs", as described by architectural writer Sarah Landau, which were a departure from earlier designs. The architects wrote that the style had been chosen for its "simplicity and grace, as well as its supreme dignity and seriousness", which fit both the site and the building's use. Inspirations include the Erechtheion, the Mausoleum of Halicarnassus, and "ancient Macedonian prototypes".

=== Form ===
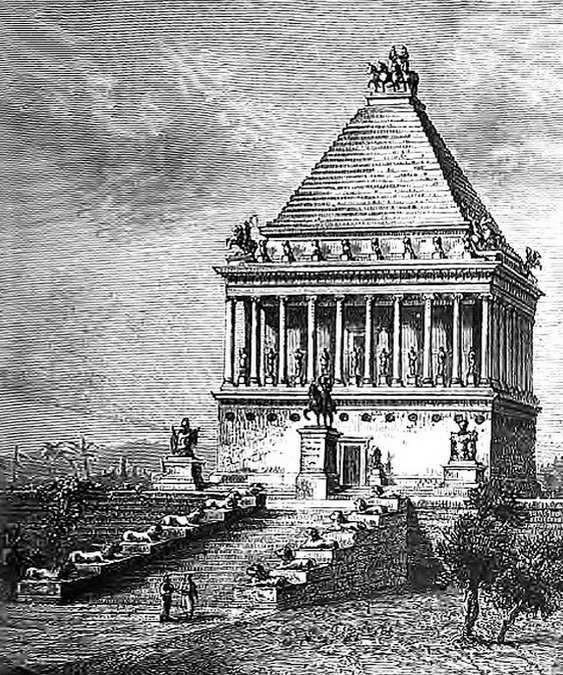
Mausoleum of Halicarnassus, concept

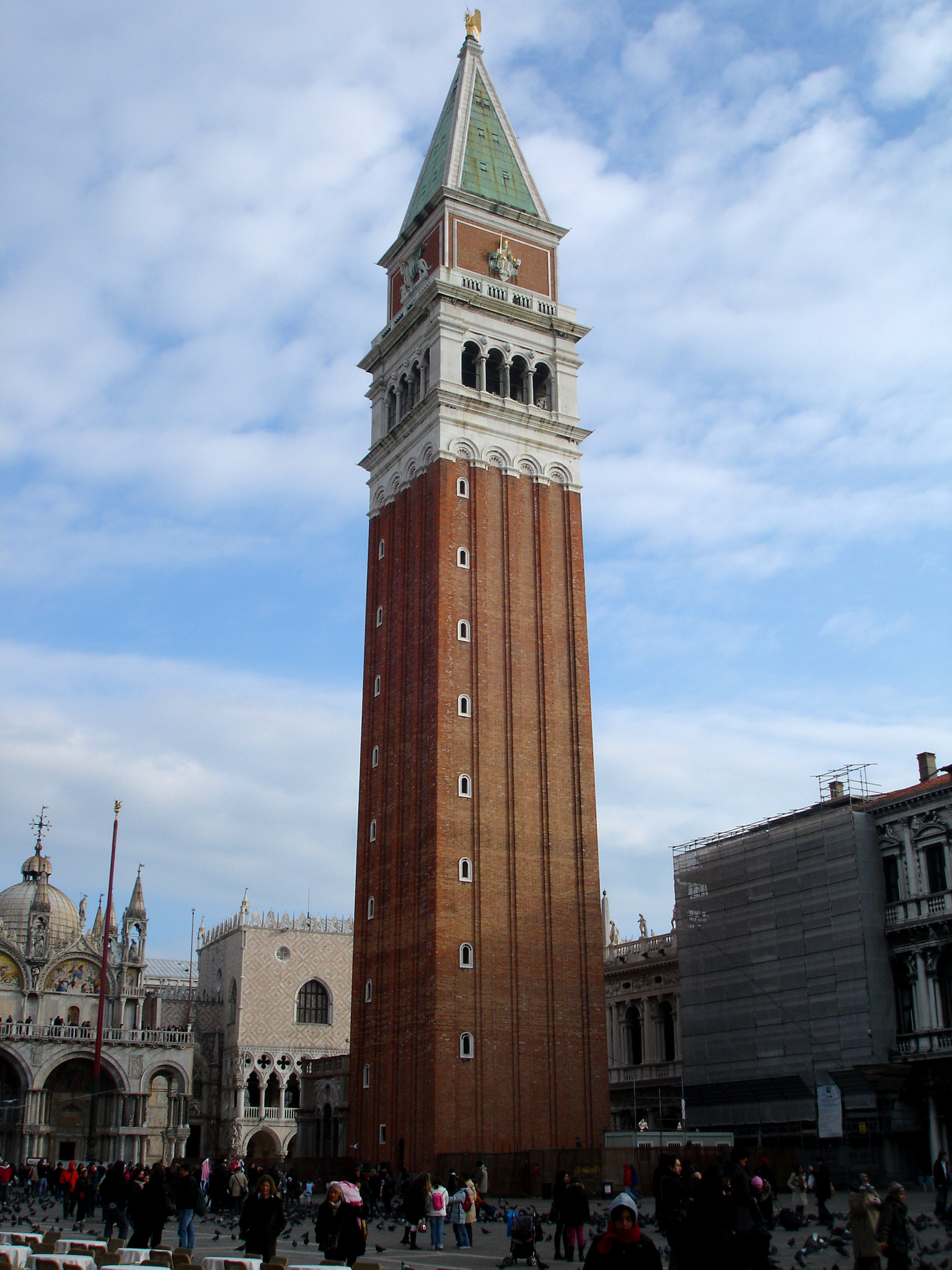
St Mark's Campanile

The original structure is a 39-story tower without any setbacks, composed of 32 stories topped by a seven-story roof. The concept behind the original structure's design was to place a pyramidal roof, similar to that of the Mausoleum of Halicarnassus, on top of a tower like Venice's St Mark's Campanile bell tower. Trowbridge wanted to enhance "the beauty of the upper part of building by a loggia and a stone pyramid, in place of the usual flat or mansard roof." This was one of the first times a pyramidal roof had been used in a skyscraper (after only the Metropolitan Life Insurance Company Tower); previous tall structures had been capped by a cupola, spire, or tempietto.

The rest of the building is surrounded by a 25-story annex, which wraps around the western and northern sides of the original tower. The Wall Street side has setbacks at the 15th, 22nd, and 25th floors and the Nassau Street side has a setback at the 23rd floor. The Pine Street side has a light court above the 11th story, which cuts through the center of that side.

=== Facade ===
==== Original building ====
The facade is clad with 8,000 short tons (7,100 long tons; 7,300 t) of New England granite from several quarries. The original tower is arranged into four sections: a base of 5 stories, a midsection of 21 stories, a top section of 6 stories (including the 32nd-story penthouse), and the roof. The base was originally four stories, but the present third floor was added in the 1931–1933 renovation. On each side are five window bays, each of which contain two windows per floor. The design of each side is largely identical, except that the western facade's midsection is made of brick rather than granite. The windows originally had wood frames covered with metal.

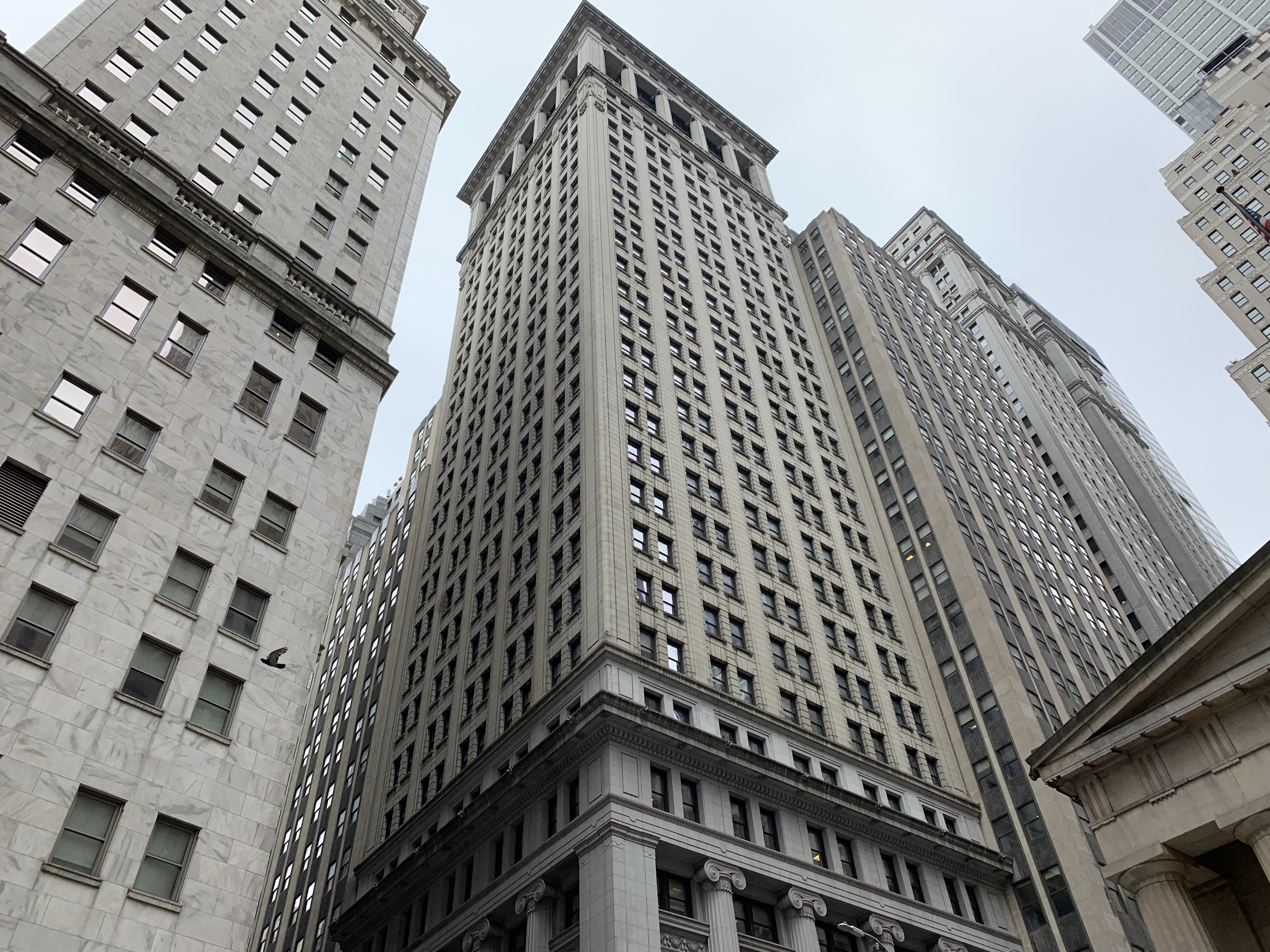
Original tower (center) and annexes (near left and near right). To the far left is the New York Stock Exchange Building, while Federal Hall National Memorial is at bottom right, and Equitable Building is at far right.

Because 14 Wall Street was surrounded on all sides by other skyscrapers, thereby limiting visibility of the lower section, the lower floors were designed with intricate detail. The upper basement and the first floor were arranged as a stylobate that supported a colonnade above it. The basement facade is smooth, while the first-floor facade consists of rusticated blocks. An entrance porch, with the address 16 Wall Street, faces the Wall Street side. A colonnade above it spans the second through fourth floors. The colonnade consists of Greek fluted columns, molded belt courses, and moldings and was "almost Puritanical in its simplicity". The facade of the lower stories was rearranged slightly when the current third story was created, with new spandrel panels being added to separate the double-height windows that formerly spanned the double-height second story. The fifth story is the topmost story of the base and has a deep cornice at the top. The cornice contains motifs of lions' heads and rosettes.

The midsection begins at the sixth story and rises through the 26th story. It is mostly faced in buff-colored granite. Each bay contains two windows. There are slightly projecting vertical piers separating each bay, except at the corners, which have grooves that make them appear as though they were panels. There is a band course above the sixth floor. Otherwise, the midsection lacks horizontal ornamentation.

The 27th through 31st stories are decorated with engaged Ionic columns in antis. On the 27th through 29th stories, the north, east, and south facades are set back behind colonnades, while the west facade extends outward to the columns of the colonnade. Trowbridge and Livingston had wanted the colonnade on the 27th through 29th stories to contain double columns, as they believed a colonnade of single columns did not suggest "a sufficient massiveness to correspond with the building as a whole". Rectangular windows are located on the 30th and 31st stories, with a cornice between the stories. The 32nd floor is slightly set back and serves as a penthouse. A molded cornice runs above the 32nd story. The roof is made of massive granite blocks and measures 94 feet (29 m) tall, with a base of 70 feet (21 m) square. There are 23 or 24 steps between the bottom and top of the roof; each step measures 3 feet 9.25 inches (1.1494 m) high and 1 foot 4 inches (0.41 m) deep. The roof also has a smokestack measuring 6 feet (1.8 m) in diameter, from which smoke is ventilated.

==== Annex ====
The annex's facade is made of granite at the base and limestone on the upper stories. It was designed to defer to the "solid and robust architecture" of the original building. The facade of the annex is arranged in two styles. The Wall Street facade contains setbacks at lower stories, and the window arrangement is aligned with that of the original building. The base consists of four stories. Like the original tower, the first floor is rusticated, and the second through fourth floors contain a colonnade. On upper stories, wide piers divide each bay, and narrow piers divide each window. The piers are ribbed and are designed in a modernistic style. The spandrels between each row of windows are ornamented aluminum panels. The combination of piers, spandrels, and windows create a pattern of vertical striping.

The Pine Street and Nassau Street facades are more modern in design, with motifs in the Modern Classic and Art Deco styles. Due to variations in the lot lines on the annex's site, the annex projects 16 feet (4.9 m) further onto the street than did the original building. In addition to an entrance at the center of the annex's Nassau Street side, there are service entrances on Pine Street. The annex facades contain carved ornament, curved piers at the base, wrought-iron gates and grilles, and an eagle sculpture above the entrance on Nassau Street. There are five bays on Nassau Street and eleven on Pine Street; the bays each contain between one and three windows. The base is two stories tall, excluding the basement, which is partially visible as Nassau Street slopes downward from Pine Street toward Wall Street. The design of the upper stories' facade is similar to that on the Wall Street side.

=== Structural features ===
For the foundation of 14 Wall Street, caissons were sunk around the site's perimeter, reaching to the layer of rock 65 feet (20 m) below the street. Concrete was then poured in between these caissons to create a watertight cofferdam measuring 6 to 7 feet (1.8 to 2.1 m) thick. The membrane was needed because the surrounding ground was filled with quicksand. Afterward, the lot was excavated, the Gillender Building's foundations were removed, and deep foundations were placed within the lot. Due to high pressure on the cofferdam, temporary timber trusses were used to brace the cofferdam. A 3-foot-thick (0.91 m) pad of concrete, overlaid with waterproof cement, was then placed at the bottom of the pit. The method was not only cheaper than the then-standard method of driving caissons down to bedrock, but also provided more basement space, as the basements were not interrupted by piers for the foundation.

The superstructure contains more than 8,000 short tons (7,100 long tons; 7,300 t) of steel. The second floor does not contain any columns because of the elaborate network of heavy trusses used to support the outer walls. "Unusually heavy bracing" is used to support the fourth floor. There are also four large trusses, two each at the fifth and 29th floors; they each measure 12 feet (3.7 m) thick and weigh 50 short tons (45 long tons; 45 t). A standard girder-and-column steel structure is used for the rest of the building. The steel frame includes about 39 tiers of beams, which extend to 537 feet (164 m) above ground. Thirty-six columns carry the building's estimated dead load of 47,102 short tons (42,055 long tons; 42,730 t). The largest columns are 500 feet (150 m) tall and carry loads of up to 2,200 short tons (2,000 long tons; 2,000 t).

=== Interior ===
The builders ensured that 14 Wall Street would be constructed with fireproof material. Metal was used in place of the wood trim that was used for decoration in other buildings, and a sprinkler system was placed in the roof.

==== Bankers Trust offices ====
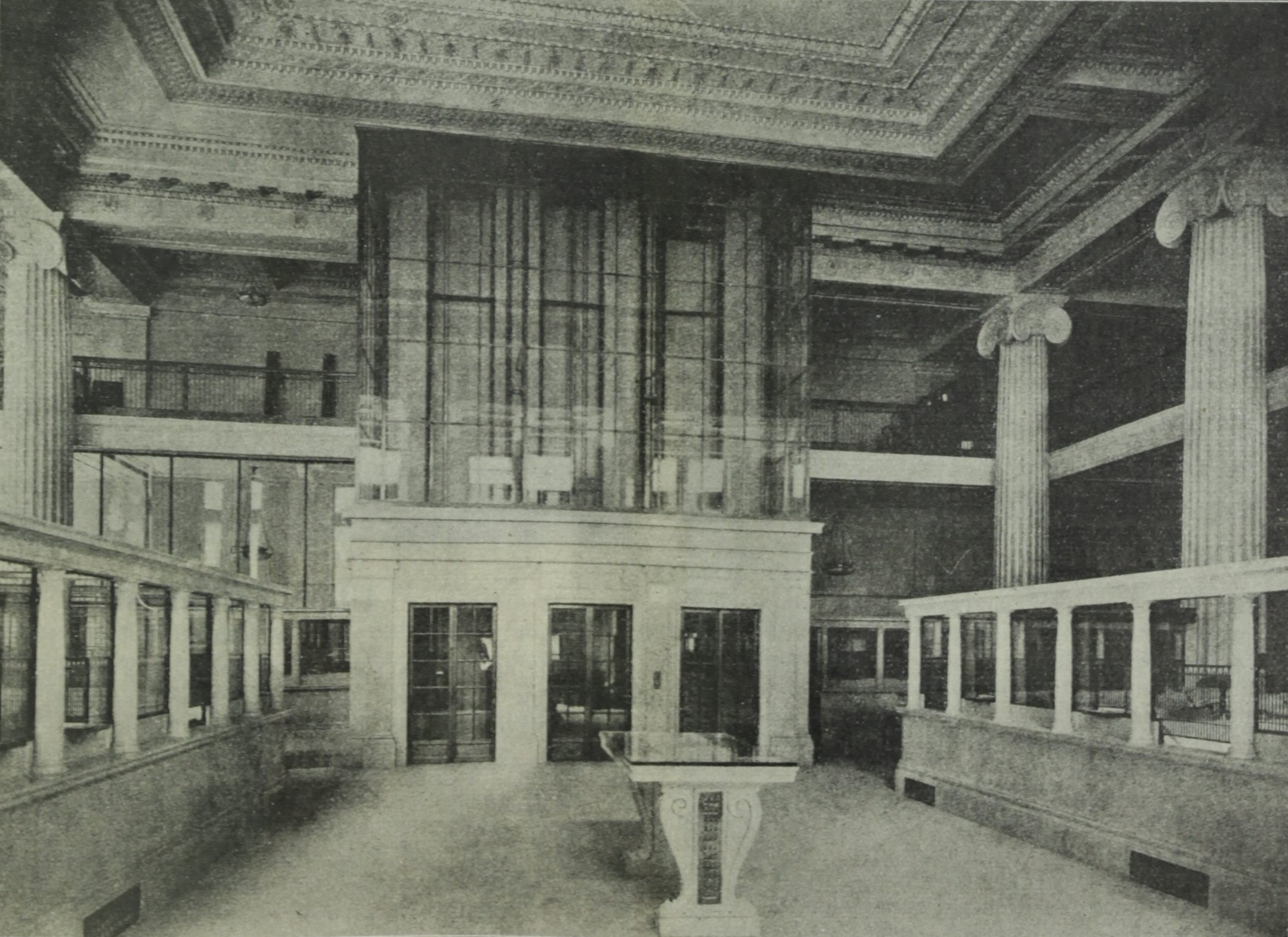
The lower portion of the shared elevator shaft, within the Bankers Trust offices, was covered in marble, while the upper portion was plate glass.

Bankers Trust's offices occupied basement levels A and B, as well as the first, second, and fourth stories. The offices housed the banking, trust, and foreign departments of Bankers Trust. These offices were designed "in a pure classic style"; the metalwork in the offices was a light-colored bronze, while Italian marble lined the main banking spaces on the first and second floors. At the time of the building's opening, The Bankers Magazine observed that the offices used modular equipment that could be moved easily in case the company needed to expand. Further, the floor surfaces were made of cork, and each department had telephone service. Pneumatic tube systems made it easy to send papers between different departments and to a lawyer's office on the 26th story.

The second floor contained the main banking room, with tellers' windows, trust departments, and other banking departments. The main banking room was designed in a Greek style and had 27-foot-high (8.2 m) ceilings; the walls were clad in Tavernelle marble for their full height. The tellers' counters originally aligned with the exterior windows. There was a small room on the south side of the second floor, which was dedicated to Henry Pomeroy Davison of the bank's executive committee. Three elevators connected the Bankers Trust office floors and rose only to the fourth floor. Unusual for buildings of the time, the lower portion of the shared elevator shaft was covered in marble, while the upper portion was plate glass. The fourth floor contained the boardroom and clerical force. The boardroom's walls and table were made of Circassian walnut, and there was enough space for 38 people to sit around the table.

At the center of the Wall Street side, a wide staircase led to the first floor. Initially, this was the main entrance to the Bankers Trust offices. The lobby contains a bronze gate with symbols of capitalist enterprises such as metallurgy, shipping, construction, power, agriculture, manufacturing, and mining. Allegorical paintings in the lobby depicted similar motifs. When the building was expanded from 1931 to 1933, the former banking room on the first floor was converted into an officers' seating area, and the floor level was raised to harmonize with the new extension. The double-height second story was divided into two stories, and the third story was created. The new addition, with the address 16 Wall Street, contained a T-shaped banking room covering 10,000 square feet (930 m^{2}), with "a forest of squared-off, trunk-like columns clad in Oregon myrtle". The new banking room's coved ceiling was 27 feet (8.2 m) tall.

==== Basements ====
The building has four basement levels, two of which were occupied by Bankers Trust's safe-deposit vault. Described by The Bankers Magazine as "the strongest vault in the world", the vault measured 28 by 32 feet (8.5 by 9.8 m) across. The vault weighed 1,550 short tons (1,380 long tons; 1,410 t) and had 160 safe-deposit boxes; the vault door alone weighed 40 short tons (36 long tons; 36 t). The vault walls were 28 inches (710 mm) thick, with 24 inches (610 mm) of concrete and 4 inches (100 mm) of "shock and drill-proof steel". This would prevent both standard explosives and oxyacetylene cutters from penetrating the vault. The columns and beams that reinforce the vault are so strong that "a shock sufficient to disturb the vault would bring the building down in ruins upon it". Inside, the vault was split into numerous aisles with combination locks; each safe in the vault required two officers to open.

When the building was completed, the basement also had a mail carriers' station, where couriers could collect packages and deliver them to tenants. The third basement contained ventilation openings and fans, while the fourth and deepest basement contained the power and steam plants.

==== Upper stories ====
The remaining stories were rented to various tenants. The office stories contained floor surfaces made of concrete, as well as walls of marble, plaster, and terracotta. As a fireproofing measure, the doors, window sash, and trim were made of metal; the trim was then finished to look like mahogany. Each story contained ornate bronze mailboxes that were connected to a set of mail chutes. A continuous 531-step staircase runs from the third floor to the 29th floor. When the building first opened, entry to these floors was via an entrance on the western portion of the Wall Street facade, where a passageway linked to the Hanover Bank Building to the north. During the 1931–1933 expansion, a new entrance was built on Pine Street. The annex's lobby was designed in the Art Deco style. Each story in the annex is at the same height as in the original building, allowing for continuous floor slabs across both structures; the expanded floor slabs cover about 23,000 square feet (2,100 m^{2}) each. The upper stories of the annex have ceiling heights of 13 feet (4.0 m).

A system of eleven elevators connected the lobby to the rental floors, consisting of five "express" elevators, five "local" elevators, and one "relief" elevator. The "express" elevators ran nonstop from the lobby to the 16th story and above. The "local" elevators served the lower floors, and the "relief" elevators served all floors. There was an additional elevator serving the 30th through 38th floors. (Note: Contemporary sources, published in 1911–1912, refer to this as the 29th through 37th floors, since the current third floor had not been built yet.) The elevator lobbies contained Botticino-marble walls and travertine floors. As of 2023, the building has 34 elevators.

The present-day 32nd floor, the highest story beneath the roof, (Note: Sources refer to this as the 31st floor, since the current third floor had not been built at the time of the building's completion.) was supposed to have been an apartment, which J. P. Morgan had an option to occupy. He chose not to pursue the option due to antitrust proceedings ongoing against Bankers Trust at the time of the building's completion, and the space was instead converted to an observation deck. The space measured 70 by 70 feet (21 by 21 m) and was illuminated by 36 windows. The New York Times reported at the building's 1912 opening that $250,000 had been spent on "teakwood furniture, priceless rugs, luxurious baths, and a private observation balcony", though it was "entirely devoid of furniture". The balcony was surrounded by an iron railing on three sides and was glassed-in on the remaining side. Christopher Gray, an architectural critic for the Times, wrote in 2007 that there had been unsubstantiated rumors that Morgan used the apartment as a private getaway. The 32nd floor contained an upscale French restaurant called The 14 Wall Street from 1997 to 2006. Under the roof were 47 storage rooms, as well as records, a sprinkler tank, a water tank, and elevator equipment.

== History ==
=== Context and land acquisition ===
Gillender and Stevens buildings (in red) and the Bankers Trust Building that replaced them, looking from the Nassau Street (east) elevation

Bankers Trust was founded in 1903 when a number of commercial banks needed a vehicle to enter the trusts and estates market. The company originally was located at Liberty and Washington Streets, with eight staff working in two basement rooms. The Bankers Trust ultimately acquired space in the Gillender Building, having been induced to move there because of the proximity of the New York Stock Exchange. The company, with J. P. Morgan on the board, grew rapidly and intended to land itself permanently in the "vortex of America's financial life".

During the latter part of the decade, financial institutions such as the Bank of Montreal, the Fourth National Bank, and the Germania Life Insurance Company acquired properties on Wall and Nassau Streets. Bankers Trust started to negotiate the purchase of the Gillender Building in April 1909. The bank first obtained the adjacent seven-story Stevens Building; that July, the trust leased the Stevens Building for 84 years at a cost of $1.5 million. (Note: The company preferred leasing over outright purchase due to the high price of land on Wall Street.) At the time, the press reported that Bankers Trust would erect a 16-story office building wrapping around the Gillender Building. George B. Post, hired as a "professional advisor", proposed the new building as an L-shaped structure.

In November, Bankers Trust finalized an agreement to buy the Gillender Building from Helen Gillender. The next month, the Manhattan Trust Company acquired the Gillender Building for $1.5 million (equivalent to $53,750,000 in 2025), then a record amount for land in New York City. Manhattan Trust then resold the Gillender Building to Bankers Trust for $1.25 million (equivalent to $44,792,000 in 2025), although Manhattan Trust retained long-term lease rights for the ground floor as well as various other spaces. According to The New York Times, Manhattan Trust and Bankers Trust had colluded to acquire the Gillender Building. During this time, Bankers Trust acquired a majority share in the Guaranty Trust Company; the same people served on both companies' boards of directors, although Guaranty Trust built a new headquarters for itself rather than move to 14 Wall Street. Bankers Trust and the Mercantile Trust Company also merged, but, because Mercantile Trust's headquarters burned in a January 1912 fire, this affected planning for the new building. Bankers Trust absorbed Manhattan Trust in February 1912: both companies had been owned by Morgan, and the proximity of the companies' spaces was cited as a reason for the merger.

=== Construction and early use ===
To maximize land utilization, Bankers Trust desired to build a structure taller than either the Gillender or Stevens buildings. To "obtain the very best results" for the design, in 1909, Bankers Trust requested plans from four architects and architecture firms: Carrère and Hastings, Francis H. Kimball, Trowbridge and Livingston, and Warren and Wetmore. Ultimately, Trowbridge and Livingston's bid was accepted. The firm submitted plans for 14 Wall Street to the New York City Department of Buildings on April 20, 1910.

==== Initial building ====
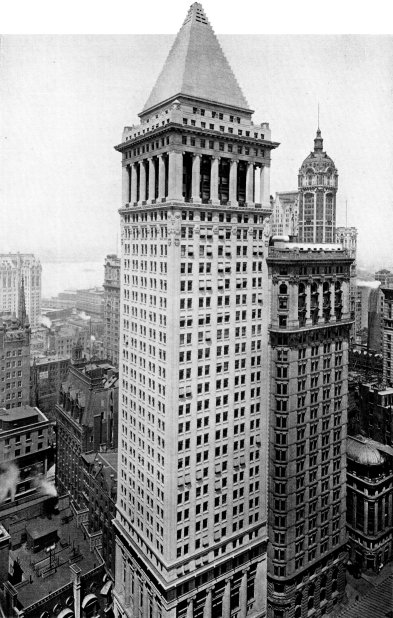
Seen circa 1919

The first stage of construction commenced in April 1910 with the demolition of the Gillender Building, which The New York Times claimed to be the first skyscraper that was demolished to make way for a taller skyscraper. Demolition of the Stevens Building started the same month, and both buildings had been demolished by June 1910. After the site had been cleared, foundation work was started. Foundational work was stymied due to the quicksand in the ground, as well as the presence of redundant supports underneath the Gillender Building's site and the proximity of other buildings. Steel superstructure construction commenced after foundational work was completed in November 1910, and the steel had reached the ground level by December 20, 1910. Facade work commenced in February 1911, with contractor Marc Eidlitz & Son erecting the facade at a rate of three-and-a-half stories per week. The building topped out on June 14, 1911. The stonework was completed by September 15, 1911, except for the pyramid, for which there had been a minor change in design.

The basements and the three lower floors were to contain the headquarters of Bankers Trust, although its main operations would be housed elsewhere in less expensive offices. Most of the upper floors were slated to be rented to other companies. By May 1911, The Wall Street Journal reported that "a large amount of office space" had already been rented in the building. Asking rates for rental space was $4 per square foot ($43/m^{2}), equivalent to $138 per square foot ($1,490/m^{2}) in 2025; this rate was higher than in other buildings in the area due to 14 Wall Street's proximity to the New York Stock Exchange. That November, The Wall Street Journal reported that the building was 65% rented. In April 1912, a month before the building's opening, a parachutist jumped from the 32nd floor of 14 Wall Street, landing on the roof of 26 Wall Street.

14 Wall Street officially opened on May 1, 1912, and Bankers Trust began moving into its offices on May 20. Upon opening, the building was 85% rented. J.P. Morgan & Co. had originally planned to move into 14 Wall Street, with Morgan occupying the 32nd-story apartment, but these plans were canceled shortly after the building opened. After Bankers Trust was investigated by the U.S. Congress's Pujo Committee for monopolistic practices, J.P. Morgan & Co. built another structure to the southeast at 23 Wall Street. By 1917, Bankers Trust had become a full-service bank, and one of the country's wealthiest financial institutions. Bankers Trust, having rented out the upper floors, found their existing space to be inadequate by the 1920s, with more than four times as many staff as in 1912. As a result, the company took up space in the Astor and Hanover Bank buildings.

==== Annex ====
Bankers Trust began land acquisition in 1919, acquiring the Astor Building that June and the building at 7 Pine Street two months later. The Hanover Bank Building was not acquired until September 1929. By that time, Bankers Trust owned the eastern half of the block bounded by Broadway and Wall, Pine, and Nassau Streets. Architect Richmond Shreve described the situation as "[falling] short of a true expression of the [company's] position". Shreve's firm, Shreve, Lamb & Harmon, had created plans for an annex to the building by January 1931. The firm filed plans for the $5.5 million edifice with the New York City Department of Buildings later the same month. The Thompson–Starrett Company was hired as the general contractor for the annex.

Staff at 14 Wall Street were moved to a temporary location when work began in May 1931, and the Hanover Bank, Astor, and 7 Pine Street buildings were being razed by the next month. Workers used dynamite to clear the site of the annex. This damaged two nearby buildings near the intersection of Wall Street and Broadway, including the headquarters of the First National Bank of New York (now Citibank), which was demolished in late 1931. First National Bank sued Bankers Trust and the project's contractors for $881,500 in April 1932, alleging that the excavations had damaged its adjoining building at Broadway and Wall Street. The case lasted for two years, and First National Bank was awarded $237,500 in damages in January 1934, about a quarter of what it had sued for. In addition, Bankers Trust was released from all liability for any damage caused during construction.

Meanwhile, in November 1931, contractors began working in two five-hour shifts per day instead of one eight-hour shift, doubling the number of jobs as well as increasing daily productivity. The 25-story annex was completed in 1932, and the staff moved back into 14 Wall Street. The bank hired brokers Brown, Wheelock, Harris & Co. that October to lease out its former space in the original structure. The old building's main entrances were relocated, and its third story was also added; these renovations were completed in March 1933. The project tripled 14 Wall Street's rentable area. Bankers Trust officially opened the annex on April 10, 1933, moving into seven stories of the annex.

=== Later use ===
==== Bankers Trust occupancy ====
The Bankers Trust Company had assets of $1 billion by 1935. As a sign of the company's financial stability, in 1943, Bankers Trust bought the land under 14 Wall Street from the Sampson family, whose Stevens Building had been demolished to make way for the original tower. The building was outfitted with a modern air-conditioning system in 1955. During this era, the bank continued to grow through mergers. The bank's second headquarters in Midtown Manhattan, at 280 Park Avenue, opened in 1962, though Bankers Trust retained occupancy at 14 Wall Street. The facade of 14 Wall Street was cleaned during the mid-1960s. When One Bankers Trust Plaza was completed in 1974, more employees were relocated out of 14 Wall Street and four other locations. Afterward, the eighth through 23rd floors of the Bankers Trust Building were vacant, representing 350,000 square feet (33,000 m^{2}), though these floors were gradually rented to other tenants.

Bankers Trust retained ownership of 14 Wall Street until 1987, when the building was sold to 14 Wall Street Associates, who subsequently sold the building to 14 Wall Street Realty in 1991 and to General Electric Investment in 1992. After buying 14 Wall Street, General Electric Investment started to renovate the building for $7 million. Though Bankers Trust retained a lease through the building until 2004, with an option to cancel in 1995, the company vacated the space earlier in 1992. Manufacturers Hanover and the Chemical Bank then occupied the space that Bankers Trust had formerly used.

==== Subsequent occupancy ====
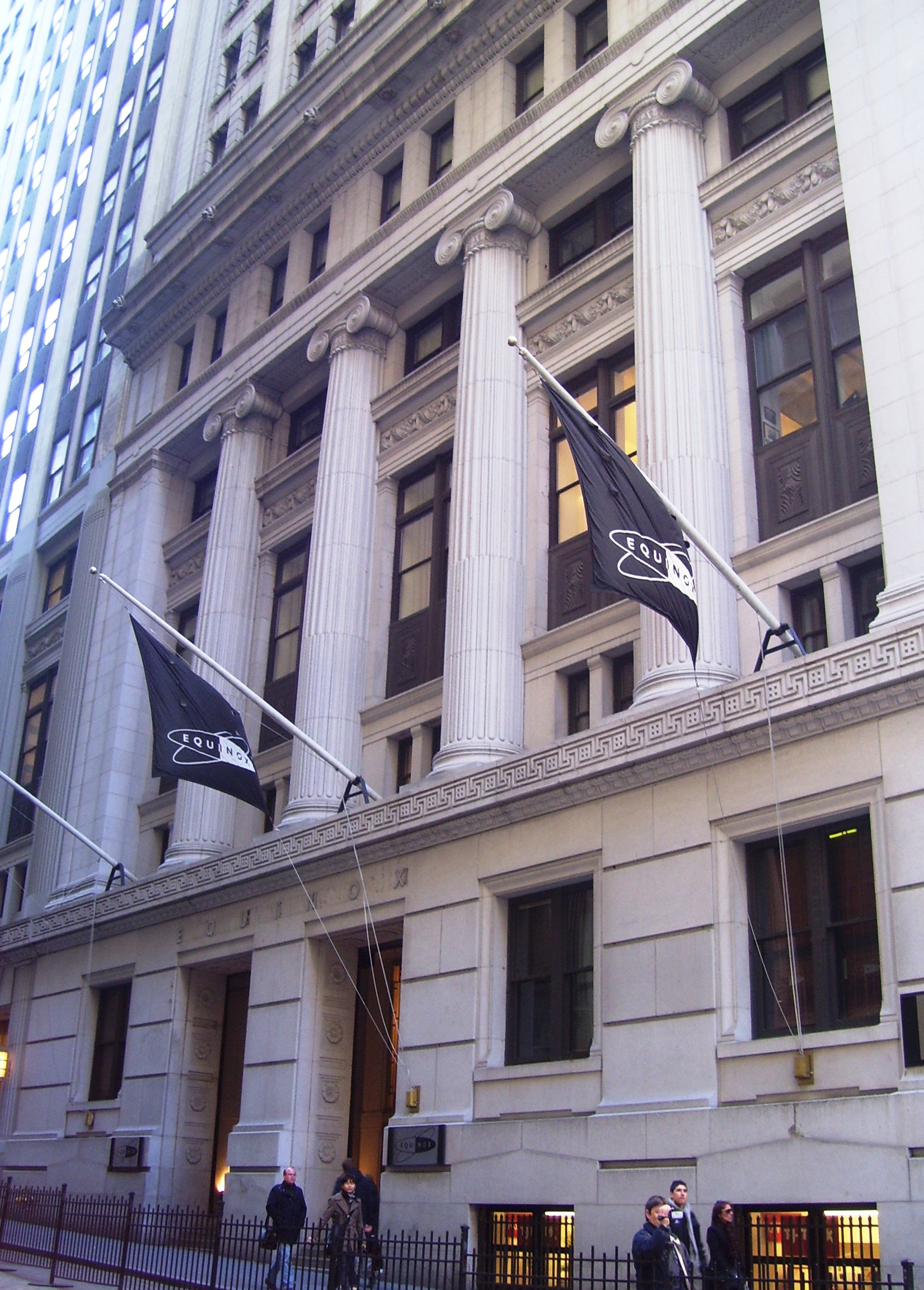
Lower portion of the facade

Boston Properties agreed to buy 14 Wall Street for $320 million in August 1997, and the 32nd floor was converted into an upscale French restaurant called The 14 Wall Street that November. The tenant of the annex's banking room, Chase Bank, donated the space to the Skyscraper Museum for one year starting in 1998. During this time, the museum held an exhibition on the Empire State Building within the space. An investment group led by Laurence Gluck and Arthur Wrubel bought 14 Wall Street from General Electric Investment in 1999. The former banking room became an Equinox Fitness location in December 2000. The Rockwell Group designed an 11,000-square-foot (1,000 m^{2}) mezzanine for the room.

Gluck had sole ownership of 14 Wall Street by 2004, and Leviev Boymelgreen bought the building from Gluck the next year for $215 million. Initially, the new owners wanted to convert the entire building from offices into luxury condominiums but, in 2006, they dropped their plan for a residential conversion. Instead, Leviev Boymelgreen ultimately converted the lower stories to condos. The 14 Wall Street restaurant also closed in early 2006. Early the following year, Leviev Boymelgreen agreed to sell the property to Cushman & Wakefield for $325 million. Ultimately, 14 Wall Street was purchased by the Carlyle Group and Capstone Equities, who planned to renovate the building for $50 million, including $5 million for the restoration of the lobby.

Carlyle and Capstone sold majority control of the building in 2012 to Alexander Rovt, a Ukrainian fertilizer tycoon, for $303 million in cash. Rovt paid off the building's outstanding debt as part of the deal. At the time of the purchase, the building had 300,000 square feet (28,000 m^{2}) of vacant space, and three potential tenants were in discussion to lease about two-thirds of the vacant space. Rovt began renovating the building and increased its occupancy rate from 70 to 95 percent by 2014, mostly by leasing space for ten years to tenants such as office-space operator Regus. After $60 million of renovations, the building was 90% leased by early 2016. Cushman & Wakefield handled leasing for 14 Wall Street until it was replaced by the CBRE Group in 2017.

== Tenants ==
- Aflac
- Amerigroup
- Equinox Fitness
- FDM Group
- NYU Langone Medical Center
- Posse Foundation
- IWG
- TheStreet.com

== Impact ==
At the time of its completion, 14 Wall Street was the world's tallest bank building and the city's third- or fourth-tallest skyscraper. 14 Wall Street and the nearby Singer Tower, as viewed from Manhattan's waterfront, resembled "the posts of the gigantic 'Gateway of New York.'" Cassier's Magazine wrote that the building "presents a beautiful and impressive appearance, free from ornate decoration", though the magazine misattributed the building as being influenced by Egyptian pyramids. The building was perceived by several observers as a symbol of the future. During the early 20th century, Bankers Trust used imagery of 14 Wall Street in its advertising to depict it as a "tower of strength"; the bank used the icon and slogan until the 1980s. Charles Phelps Cushing wrote in 1929 that the building's stepped pyramidal roof was "the meeting place for the midnight frolics of modern jazz sprites".

The iconography persisted even after the annex was constructed. 14 Wall Street's likeness became synonymous with capitalism and Wall Street, having been shown in Berenice Abbott's photos as well as the 1921 documentary film Manhatta, and Bankers Trust sent a miniature model of the building to the Panama–Pacific International Exposition in 1915. Christopher Gray said that the massive height of 14 Wall Street posed a sharp contrast to the one-story 23 Wall Street, diagonally across Wall and Broad Streets, though both were designed by Trowbridge & Livingston and occupied by J.P. Morgan.

14 Wall Street's pyramidal roof inspired the design of several other buildings. Its completion was described as the "beginning of a vogue for the use of a temple or mausoleum" at the top of skyscrapers, utilizing enhanced details or a full depiction of a temple. Architecture magazine projected that such a roof "will be used a great many times more". Several roofs in Lower Manhattan were influenced by 14 Wall Street's design, including those of 26 Broadway, 40 Wall Street, 60 Wall Street, the annex of 195 Broadway, and the Jewish Museum annex. 14 Wall Street's architecture also provided inspiration for buildings in other cities, such as the Union Central Life Insurance Company Building in Cincinnati, the Metropolitan Tower in Chicago, and the Foshay Tower in Minneapolis.

The New York City Landmarks Preservation Commission designated 14 Wall Street as an official city landmark in January 1997. In 2007, the building was designated as a contributing property to the Wall Street Historic District, a National Register of Historic Places district.

== See also ==
- List of New York City Designated Landmarks in Manhattan below 14th Street
