= Kaskel and Kaskel Building =

Former building in Manhattan, New York

Coordinates: 40.7472°N 73.9858°W

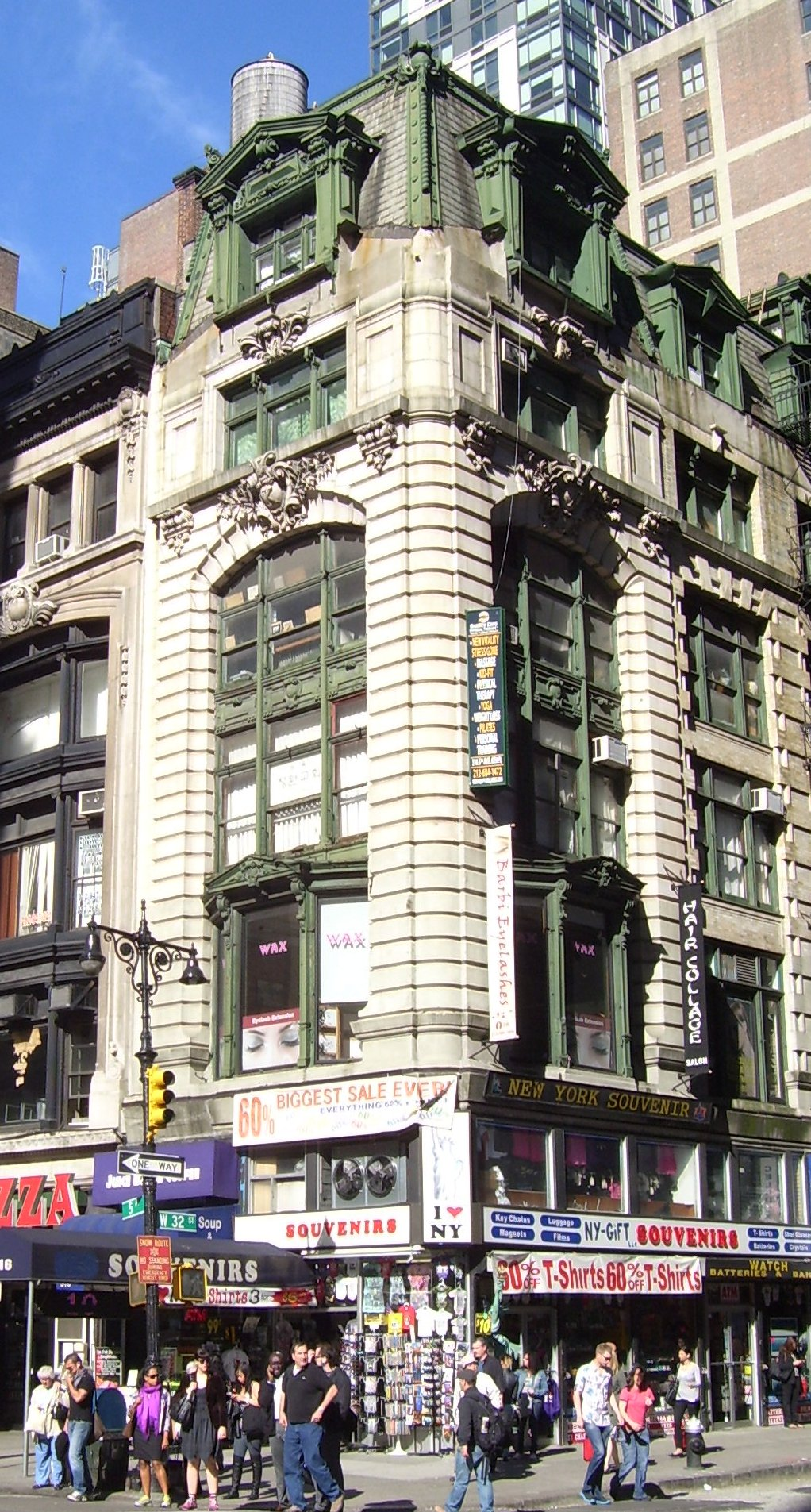
- The front of the Kaskel & Kaskel Building (2011)
- Interactive map of the Kaskel and Kaskel Building area

General information
- Architectural style: Baroque Revival architecture
- Location: Manhattan, New York City
- Opened: 1902
- Demolished: 2017

Design and construction
- Architect: Charles I. Berg

The Kaskel and Kaskel Building was a building at 316 Fifth Avenue, near 32nd Street, in the NoMad/Koreatown neighborhood of Manhattan, New York City. It was completed in 1902 and demolished in 2017, after an unsuccessful attempt to save it.

== History ==
Kaskel & Kaskel Co was one of New York's leading haberdasheries, providing shirts for the city's wealthiest gentlemen, including the President of the United States. The company commissioned architect Charles I. Berg to design a new headquarters and retail space at 316 Fifth Avenue in 1902.

Kaskel & Kaskel eventually sold the building and it became home to many small shops. In 2017 it was to be demolished to make way for a 40-story tower. The New York City Landmarks Preservation Commission would not designate it as a landmark because "extensive changes have reduced its historic integrity". Still, preservationists tried to save it.
