= William Salomon House =

Demolished mansion in Manhattan, New York

Coordinates: 40°46′46.57″N 73°57′41.36″W

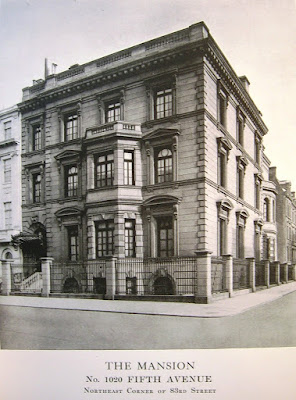
William A. Salomon Town House

The William Salomon House was a mansion located on 1020 Fifth Avenue in Manhattan, New York City.

The house was built in the 1880s as a four-story brownstone home. It was formerly the residence of Richard Arnold, founder of Arnold Constable & Company department store, who died in 1886. The site was sold to banker William Salomon Sr. in 1900; he hired Trowbridge & Livingston to renovate the existing house. In 1901 he acquired furnishings in Florence, Italy, for the home. The house was completed by 1906. The site measured 62.6 feet (19.1 m) on Fifth Avenue and 100 feet (30 m) on 83rd Street.

During his later life, Salomon acquired large amounts of Old Master paintings for the house. After Salomon died in 1919, the Duveen Brothers bought 15 Old Masters in January 1923 for about $1 million. Salomon's possessions were sold for $1,292,847 in April 1923, but there were no bids for the mansion itself. The site was sold in May 1924. Built at the same address was 1020 Fifth Avenue, an apartment building completed in 1925.
