= Jordan L. Mott House =

Demolished mansion in Manhattan, New York

Coordinates: 40.8099°N 73.9398°W

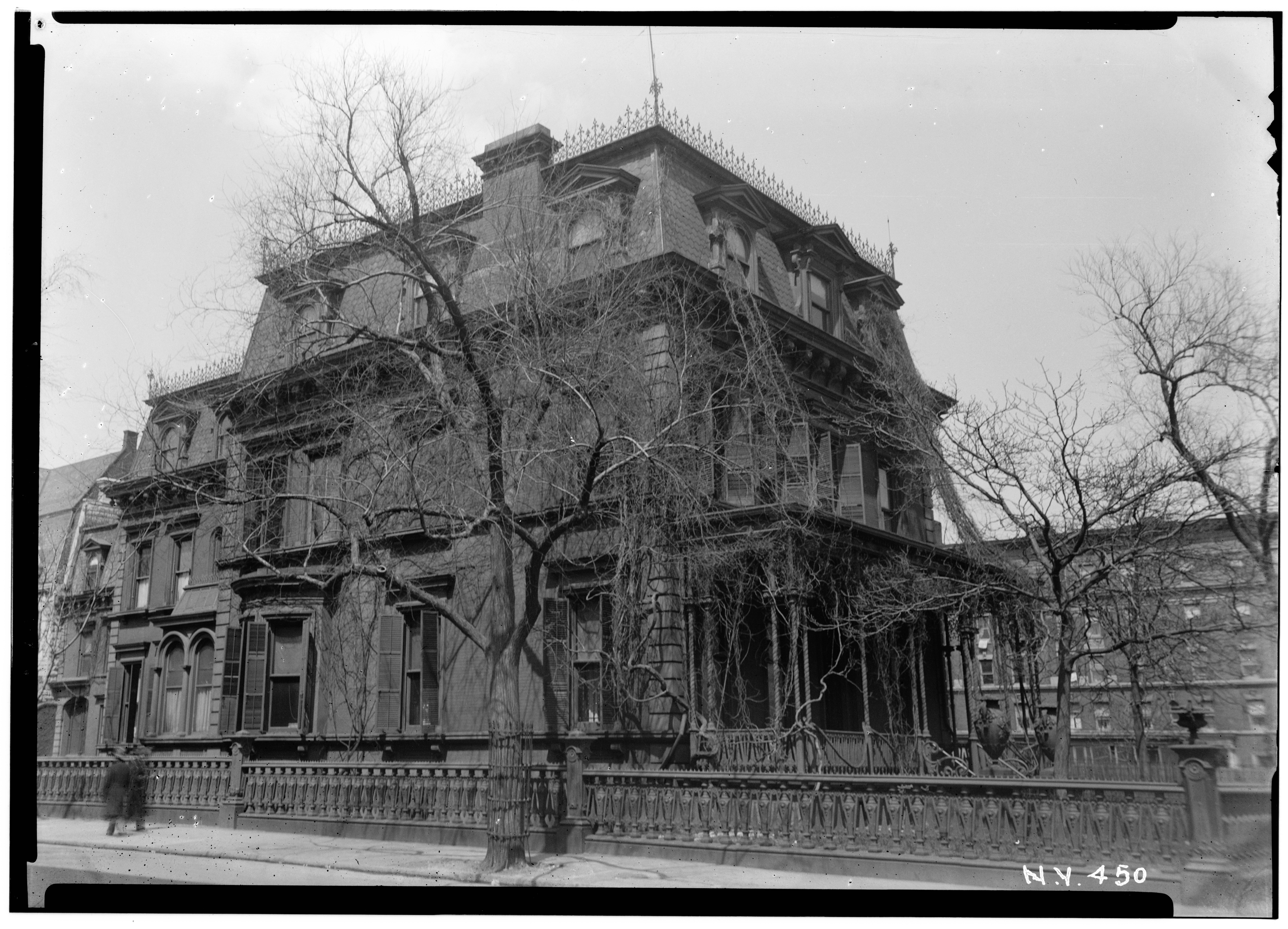
- Jordan L. Mott House, 1936, months before demolition
- Interactive map of the Jordan L. Mott House area

General information
- Status: Demolished
- Location: 2122 Fifth Avenue, New York
- Completed: 1880
- Demolished: 1936

The Jordan L. Mott House was a mansion located on 2122 Fifth Avenue, near 130th Street in the Harlem area of Manhattan, New York City.

== History ==
It was originally constructed by Richard B. "Slippery Dick" Connolly, a member of the corrupt political ring of William Magear "Boss" Tweed. After Connolly fled the country, the mansion was bought by the industrialist Jordan L. Mott and subsequently completed in 1880. It was demolished in 1936.
