= Trinity Court Building (1927–2015) =

Demolished building in Manhattan, New York

Trinity Court Building (II)
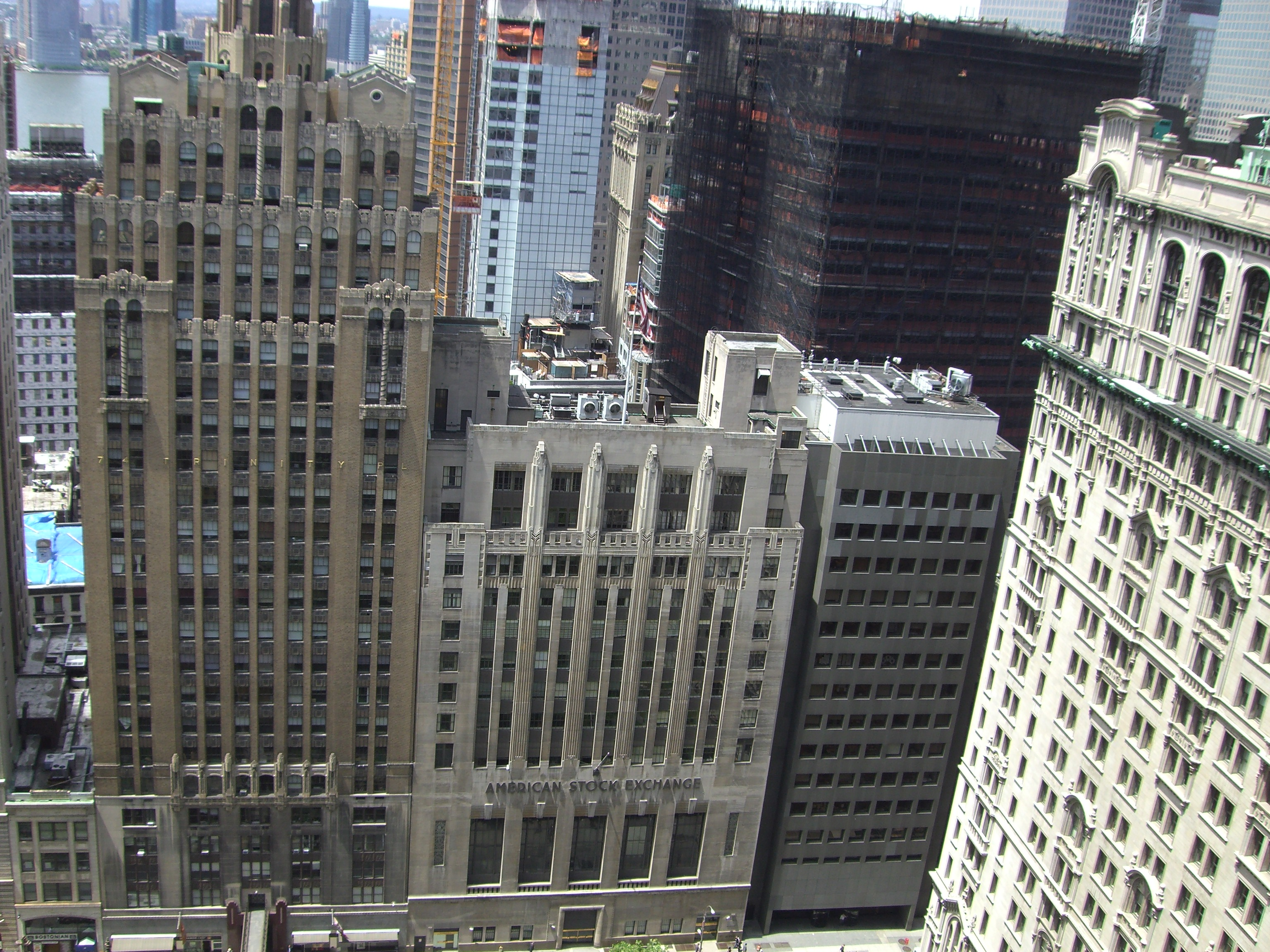
- The second Trinity Court Building (left) in 2009
- Interactive map of the Trinity Court Building (II) area

General information
- Location: 76 Trinity Place; Financial District, Manhattan, New York
- Coordinates: 40°42′31″N 74°00′46″W
- Completed: 1927
- Demolished: 2015

The Trinity Court Building was a building in Lower Manhattan, New York City.

== History ==
The old building was torn down in 1926 to make way for a 24-story, 125,000-square-foot (11,600 m^{2}) skyscraper. It was completed in 1927. One of the earliest tenants of the new building was a company managing miniature golf courses and a golf school.

Not long after its completion, the Irving Trust began started construction on the Irving Trust Company Building at the corner of Wall Street and Broadway, visible from the Trinity Court Building. The builder commissioned a time study of the construction process. Eight images from that study have been preserved at the Canadian Centre for Architecture.

The building was demolished in 2015. It was built in place the Trinity Court Building (III).
