= George J. Gould House =

Demolished mansion in Manhattan, New York

Coordinates: 40°46′10″N 73°58′09″W

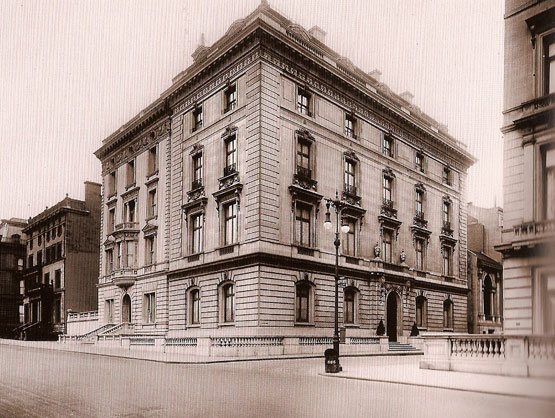
- The George J. Gould House (on the corner), with the Isaac Stern House to its left
- Interactive map of the George J. Gould House area

General information
- Architectural style: Beaux-Arts
- Completed: 1906
- Demolished: c. 1963

Design and construction
- Architect: Horace Trumbauer

The George J. Gould House was a mansion at 857 Fifth Avenue on the northeast corner of 67th Street on the Upper East Side of Manhattan, New York City.

== History ==
The home was designed in the French Beaux-Arts style by architect Horace Trumbauer of Philadelphia and constructed in 1906 for financier George Jay Gould, the eldest son of railroad magnate Jay Gould. It replaced the Neo-Gothic style Jay Gould House, which was demolished. The new house was designed both to complement and outshine the Isaac Stern House next door, at 858 Fifth Avenue.

In 1923, the house was bought by Harry Payne Whitney, and in late 1925, it became the residence of his mother-in-law, Alice Claypoole Vanderbilt. After her death in 1934, it was inherited by her youngest child Gladys, Countess Széchenyi.

The site is now occupied by 857 Fifth Avenue, a white brick building completed in 1963, which contains 17 apartments.
