= Kemble Building =

Former building in New York City

Coordinates: 40.7038°N 74.0130°W

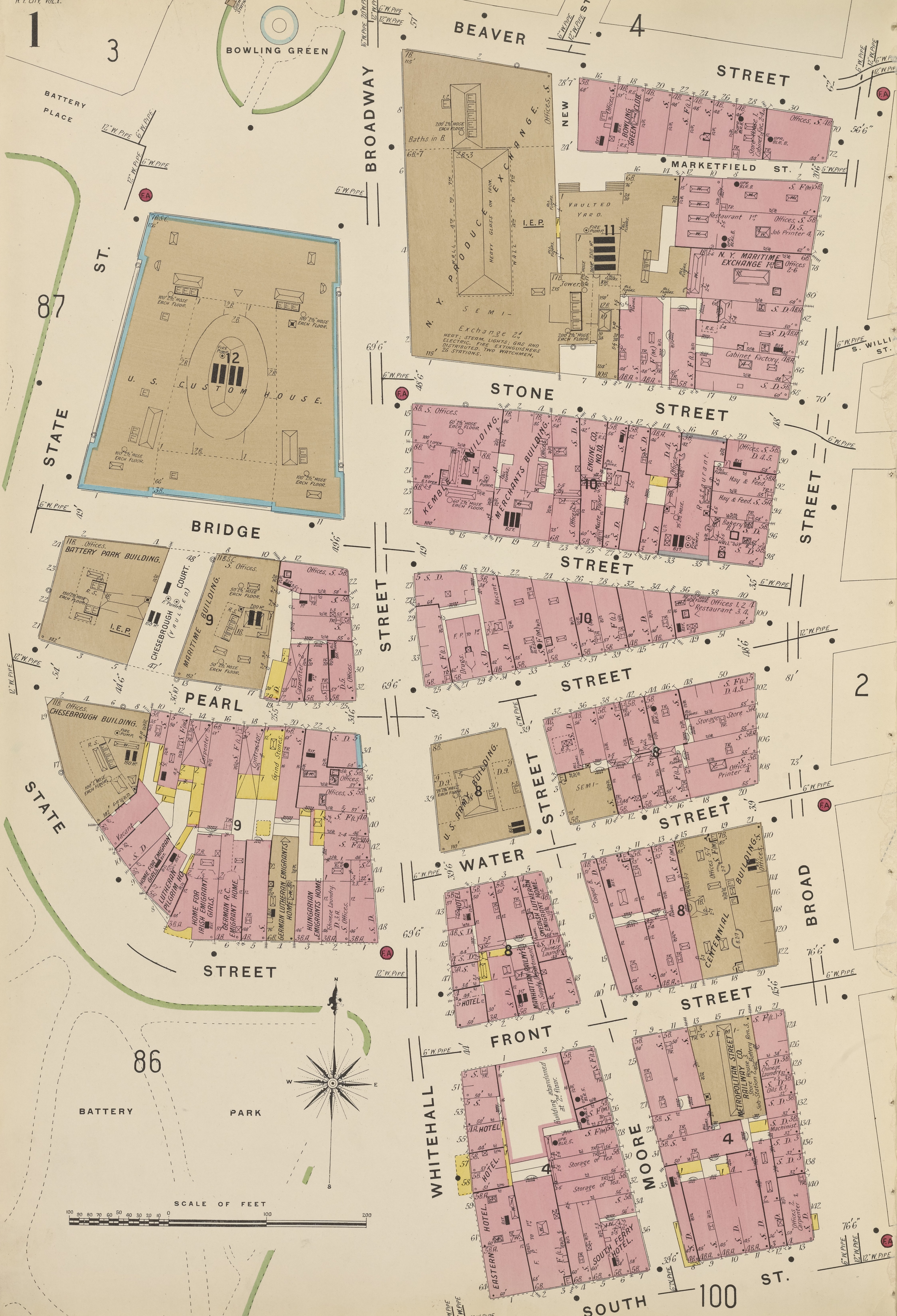
The Kemble Building in the Financial District on a map published in 1905

The Kemble Building was an eight-story edifice located at 15–25 Whitehall Street between Bridge Street and Stone Street. It stood opposite the Custom House in the Financial District of Lower Manhattan, New York City. Owned by the Ogden Goelet Estate, the structure adjoined the seven-story New York Produce Exchange Building. At first employed as a cotton warehouse, it was used for office space beginning in 1882. Prior to the Kemble Building's erection, the site was occupied by the business of Hendrick Willemsen, a baker and bread inspector.

== Leased to various tenants ==
During January 1886, room 34 of the Kemble Building was occupied by the Pennock Underground Telegraph Company.

A college graduate, who was a grammar school instructor, advertised for pupils to tutor in the afternoons or evenings in September 1886. Interested parties hoping to be tutored in the classics, mathematics, and elementary studies were requested to reply to room 105 of the Kemble Building. In June 1890 the structure hosted a meeting of wholesale liquor dealers. They met to consider possible action against arbitrary measures taken by the Whiskey Trust.

The Mary H. Packer, a schooner rigged steam ship weighing ninety-seven tons, was owned by a Mr. White, whose office was in the Kemble Building in October 1892. The vessel sank alongside a railroad pier at the foot of Hamilton Avenue, Brooklyn, New York, on October 23, 1892. It was built in Perth Amboy, New Jersey in 1886.

In 1896, the New York Produce Exchange, which maintained offices for grain brokers, was located in the Kemble Building.

One of the initial office tenants, who continued to lease space in 1935, offered the Goelet Estate $3,000,000 for the Kemble Building, but was refused. In June 1921, the Kemble Building's basement and a large store inside were leased to Unger Brothers, who opened a restaurant.

== Purchased by corporation ==
The Kemble Building was purchased for $550,000 by the 2-4 Stone Street Corporation in January 1949. Owners of the Merchants Exchange Building, the group acquired a half interest held by George Innes-Ker, 9th Duke of Roxburghe, and a comparable interest owned by Robert Goelet and Robert W. Dowling, trustees of the Ogden Goelet Estate. The transaction was paid in cash through Boyd Wilson & Company, brokers.

== See also ==
- Ogden Goelet
