= Thomas Belesis =

American chief executive

- Occupation(s): CEO and President
- Employer: John Thomas Financial
- Children: 1

Anastasios P. “Thomas” Belesis is the founder and CEO of the now-defunct John Thomas Financial, a New York City-based financial services company that was expelled from the securities industry in 2015. Belesis later settled fraud charges with regulators and agreed to a lifetime ban from the securities industry.

== Career ==
Belesis founded John Thomas Financial in 2007 after a career in brokerage and investment banking on Wall Street. It grew from a three-person brokerage to 300-employee firm that claimed to provide a full range of retail brokerage, investment banking, corporate advisory and private wealth management services.

Belesis was often invited by the leading news outlets to discuss macroeconomic trends and economic policy. He appeared regularly on broadcast media, including Fox Business Network and CNBC. He was also active in New York State and national politics. In spring 2011, he was appointed Co-Chairman of the New York State Finance Committee for the Republican Party.

Belesis played both on- and offscreen roles on the movie Wall Street: Money Never Sleeps, appearing as a trader alongside Jacob "Jake" Moore (Shia LaBeouf) and serving as advisor to Oliver Stone, helping the director to capture a more authentic view of Wall Street.

In 2009, he was presented with the Bronx Republican Party "Man of the Year" award by Rudolph Giuliani, who commented on his rise "from humble beginnings to become a great success on Wall Street" and his role in providing jobs to young people on Wall Street. Greek America Magazine named Belesis one of its 25 Most Intriguing People of 2010.

The New York Post looked into the "shady" past of Belesis in a series of articles beginning in 2012. In early 2013, another series of New York Post articles covered an investigation by the Financial Industry Regulatory Authority (FINRA) into the dealings of John Thomas Financial. Other articles in Bloomberg interviewed former employees and questioned whether the business practices and sales tactics of John Thomas Financial constituted those of a boiler room.

== Regulatory Issues and Lifetime Bar ==
On 22 March 2013, the United States Securities and Exchange Commission (SEC) announced charges against Belesis, alleging that he and an influential, Houston-based, radio host defrauded investors in two hedge funds. The charges allege that George R. Jarkesy Jr., worked closely with Belesis to launch two hedge funds that raised $30 million from investors. Jarkesy and his firm John Thomas Capital Management (since renamed Patriot28 LLC) inflated valuations of the funds' assets, causing the value of investors' shares to be overstated and his management and incentive fees to be increased. Jarkesy, a frequent media commentator and radio talk show host, also lied to investors about the identity of the funds' auditor and prime broker. Meanwhile, although they shared the same "John Thomas" brand name, Jarkesy's firm and Belesis' firm John Thomas Financial were portrayed as wholly independent. Jarkesy led investors to believe that as manager of the funds, he was solely responsible for all investment decisions. However, Belesis sometimes supplanted Jarkesy as the decision maker and directed some investments from the hedge funds into a company in which his firm was heavily invested. Belesis also bullied Jarkesy into showering excessive fees on John Thomas Financial even in instances where the firm had done virtually nothing to earn them.

In 2015, John Thomas Financial was expelled from the securities industry by the Financial Industry Regulatory Authority and Belesis was banned for life. The agency said the actions were taken "based on findings that the firm and Belesis traded ahead of customer orders, and failed to immediately thereafter fill the orders at the same or a better price than the one obtained by the firm. The findings stated that the firm and Belesis failed to maintain accurate and complete books and records by failing to preserve customer order tickets. The findings also stated that Belesis provided false and misleading information to FINRA in sworn investigative testimony."

Belesis settled fraud charges with the SEC in 2017, agreeing to pay $434,628.40 in disgorgement, $64,266.86 in prejudgment interest, and a $434,628.40 civil money penalty.
