= Gillender Building =

Office skyscraper in Manhattan, New York

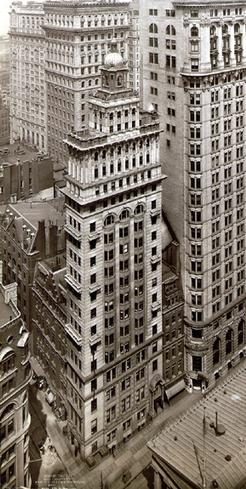
- The Gillender Building, seen from the southeast in April 1910; the larger structure on the right is the Hanover Bank Building

General information
- Status: Demolished
- Type: Office
- Location: Nassau Street, Manhattan, New York City
- Coordinates: 40°42′27″N 74°00′38″W
- Construction started: 1896
- Completed: 1897
- Demolished: 1910
- Cost: $500,000
- Owner: Helen Gillender Asinari

Height
- Roof: 273 ft (83 m)

Technical details
- Floor count: 20
- Floor area: 26 ft × 73 ft (7.9 m × 22.3 m)

Design and construction
- Architects: Charles I. Berg, Edward H. Clark
- Main contractor: Charles T. Willis Company

The Gillender Building was an early skyscraper in the Financial District of Manhattan in New York City. It stood on the northwest corner of Wall Street and Nassau Street, on a narrow strip of land measuring 26 by 73 feet (7.9 m × 22.3 m). At the time of its completion in 1897, the Gillender Building was, depending on ranking methods, the fourth- or eighth-tallest structure in New York City.

The Gillender Building was designed by Charles I. Berg and Edward H. Clark, and rose 273 feet (83 m) with 20 stories, comprising 17 floors in the main body and three floors in a cupola. The building contained a fully wind-braced steel frame with masonry infill, and included twelve columns atop three caisson foundations. On its completion, it was praised as an engineering novelty. It attracted attention for its disproportionate height and its low total rentable area of only about 30,000 square feet (2,800 m^{2}).

The Gillender Building was occupied by financial firms through its uneventful 13-year existence and was perceived as economically obsolete from the start. In 1909, financial institutions began rapidly expanding their properties within the Financial District, and that December, the building was sold to Bankers Trust for a then-record price of $822 per square foot ($8,850/m^{2}). The Gillender Building was demolished between April and June 1910 to make way for Bankers Trust's 39-story tower at 14 Wall Street, and much of the material from the building was saved. At the time, the Gillender Building was the tallest building ever demolished voluntarily.

== Site ==
The Gillender Building stood on the northwest corner of Wall Street and Nassau Street, on a narrow strip measuring 26 feet (7.9 m) on Wall Street and 73 feet (22 m) on Nassau Street. (Note: A measurement of 24.9 ft × 73.0 ft (7.6 m × 22.25 m) is given by Whitehand & Larkham 1992. Other sources reported marginally different footprints, including 25 by 74 feet (7.6 m × 22.6 m) in The New York Times; 25 by 75 feet (7.6 m × 22.9 m) in the Engineering News-Record; and 74.5 by 21.85 feet (22.71 m × 6.66 m) in the Engineering Record as measured between the centers of the superstructure's columns.) The 39-story Bankers Trust tower at 14 Wall Street, built in 1911, occupies both the site of the Gillender Building and the adjoining seven-story Stevens Building at 12-14 Wall Street. Surrounding lots to the north and west were incorporated as part of an annex to 14 Wall Street, built between 1931 and 1933.

In the 17th century, the area north of Wall Street was occupied by John Damen's farm; Damen sold the land in 1685 to captain John Knight, an officer of Thomas Dongan's administration. Knight resold the land to Dongan, and Dongan resold it in 1689 to Abraham de Peyster and Nicholas Bayard. Both de Peyster and Bayard served as Mayors of New York. The first known building on the Gillender Building's site, a sugar house, was built by Samuel Bayard. In 1718, most of the present-day block was sold to a church congregation, while the corner lot, cut into narrow strips, remained in possession of the de Peysters and the Bayards. (Note: See the 18th century map and corresponding notes in The New York Times April 10, 1910.) In 1773, de Peyster sold the corner lot to the Verplanck family for less than $1,500; the Verplanck mansion later housed Wall Street banks.

The second New York City Hall, later renamed Federal Hall, was erected in 1700 and torn down in 1816. It occupied the eastern side of present-day Nassau Street, on the site of the present-day Federal Hall National Memorial. Though Nassau Street historically curved around City Hall, it was straightened after the demolition of the second City Hall. The street's early route was retained in the placement of the corner buildings (including the Gillender Building but not 14 Wall Street), which were set back from the street, providing a sidewalk that was wider than usual. In 1816, the corner lot was owned by Charles Gardner, who sold the property the next year for $11,200; it was further resold in 1835 for $47,500 and in 1849 for $55,000. Charles Frederick Briggs and Edgar Allan Poe operated the offices of the Broadway Journal on this site from 1844 until 1845. From 1849 until December 1909, the lot remained in the hands of a single family. Adjacent lots were owned by the Sampson family since 1840, and this property was developed into the Stevens Building in 1880.

== Architecture ==
The Gillender Building was designed by Charles I. Berg and Edward H. Clark. It was erected under the supervision of consulting engineer Henry Post and general contractor Charles T. Wills, while the foundations were built by Stephens & O'Rourke (later the O'Rourke Engineering Construction Company). In addition, Maryland Steel and the Pencoyd Bridge Company provided the steel, which was erected by Post and McCord. The Gillender Building cost $500,000 to construct.

The Gillender Building belonged to "a series of elegant towers in various classical modes erected in New York in the 1890s", and is considered "a notable example" of its period along with the demolished Central National Bank Building (designed by William Birkmire in 1897) and the still-extant American Surety Building (designed by Bruce Price in 1894–1896). The New York Times erroneously called the Gillender Building the "highest office structure in the world"; the Manhattan Life Insurance Building (1894) was taller at 348 feet (106 m). The Gillender Building's rentable area (30,000 ft^{2} [2,800 m^{2}]) was on par with Manhattan's 1897 average for pre-skyscraper buildings (26,300 ft^{2} [2,440 m^{2}]) and lower than the area of adjacent six-story Stevens Building. The disproportion was made more evident in 1903, when the marginally taller Hanover National Bank Building was built on an adjacent lot, dwarfing the slender Gillender Building.

=== Form and facade ===
The Gillender Building's articulation consisted of three horizontal sections similar to the components of a column (namely a base, shaft, and capital). The bulk of the tower rose to 219 feet (67 m) without setbacks, and a three-story cupola formed the capital, reaching 273 feet (83 m). The lowest two stories of the capital covered a smaller area than the bulk of the building, though the top story comprised a dome and pinnacle. (Note: The Engineering News-Record gave an alternate measurement of 280 feet (85 m), with 21 aboveground stories including two stories in the cupola. In this measurement, only the top dome was counted as part of the cupola, while the lower two stories of the capital were counted as part of the building's bulk. The Engineering Record cited the roof as being 310 feet (94 m) above the grillage beams of the foundation. In this measurement, the bulk was 16 stories, the capital was two stories, and the dome was two stories.)

Expensive decoration was limited to the three floors of the base, the upper two floors, and the cupola. Massive cornices above the second and third floors visually separated the base from the shaft that rose until the fourteenth floor. Starting from the ninth floor, it gradually re-acquired ornaments and arched windows as if in anticipation of the ornate Italian Baroque cupola above. Copper was used to cover the dome and cornices.

=== Features ===
The Gillender Building attracted attention due to the disproportion of its height and footprint. The new structure occupied about 26 by 73 feet (7.9 m × 22.3 m), ruling out efficient space plans. Quicksand under the site required use of foundations driven by yellow-pine caissons. These caissons consumed the underground space that could be otherwise used by bank vaults or retail storage, further reducing the building's value. There were three caissons, each extending across the entire width of the building site. The caissons contained air chambers, above which were placed steel foundation grillages composed of 20 I-beams, and then a series of brick piers laid atop Portland cement. Sheet piles were then driven around the three caissons to make rectangular enclosures. There was a small cellar under the building, reaching 29 feet 8 inches (9.04 m) below the first floor.

Structurally, the building contained a fully wind-braced steel frame with masonry infill. The floors were made of hollow-tile concrete arches. while the interior partitions were made of cement mortar around wire lath. The superstructure consisted of a steel cage with twelve columns: four extending to the top of the 17th story, and eight to the top of the 19th story. The outermost two pairs of columns carried 650 short tons (580 long tons; 590 t) each; the next four columns, 750 short tons (670 long tons; 680 t); and the innermost four columns, 950 short tons (850 long tons; 860 t). The 12 columns would carry a total load of 9,000 short tons (8,000 long tons; 8,200 t). The columns were braced both horizontally and diagonally. The steel was coated with three layers of paint: one at the steel shop and two more on-site. One observer, writing about the building's frame upon its demolition, said that "the quality of paint and the application of the same were decidedly inferior", and fireproofing was provided mostly by the terracotta cladding.

Inside, the Gillender Building contained a plumbing system serving "26 water closets, 17 water basins, 12 wash basins and 5 slop sinks". The receiving tank was relatively small with a capacity of only 500 U.S. gallons (1,900 L; 420 imp gal).

== History ==
=== Construction ===
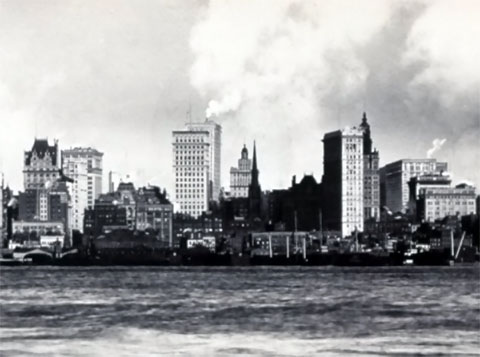
Skyline in 1902 as seen from the Hudson River looking east. The Gillender Building in the center, behind 90 West Street and Trinity Church.

During the late 1890s, Helen L. Gillender Asinari was the owner of a six-story office building on the corner of Wall and Nassau Streets, having inherited ownership of the land from her grandfather George Lovett, who had purchased the site in 1849. In 1896, Gillender Asinari decided to replace it with a 300-foot (91 m) tall tower, capitalizing on a tenfold increase in land value. At the time, the land was worth $625,000 (equivalent to $20,776,000 in 2025). The building was most likely named after Helen's father, millionaire tobacco merchant Eccles Gillender (1810–1877). According to media, Gillender Asinari had hurried to build the new tower prior to the anticipated enactment of new, stricter building codes, which led to the shortcomings of the building's design, even though the regulations did not come into effect until 1916. An alternative version presented by Joseph Korom attributes construction of the Gillender Building to Augustus Teophilus Gillender, principal partner in a law firm, but Gillender Asinari disputed this version, saying that "Mr. Augustus T. Gillender never has had, nor has he now, the slightest interest in the property."

The construction contract was awarded to the Charles T. Willis Company, while Hecla Iron Works, Atlas Cement Company, and the Okonite Company of Passaic were principal suppliers. The foundations were constructed in a month, with about one-third of that time devoted to shoring and underpinning adjacent walls; building and sinking caissons; and constructing the brick piers and sealing the air chambers with concrete. The first pier was ready for the grillage on August 17, 1896. The first column was set on September 3 and the last one in the tower was placed on November 16.

Advertised as fully fireproof and as the most modern tower on the market, the Gillender Building was occupied by financial firms through its short lifetime and was perceived as economically obsolete from the start. There were no notable incidents other than two lightning strikes in its spire in July 1897 and May 1900; the latter "sent splinters flying in every direction" without casualties.

=== Takeover ===
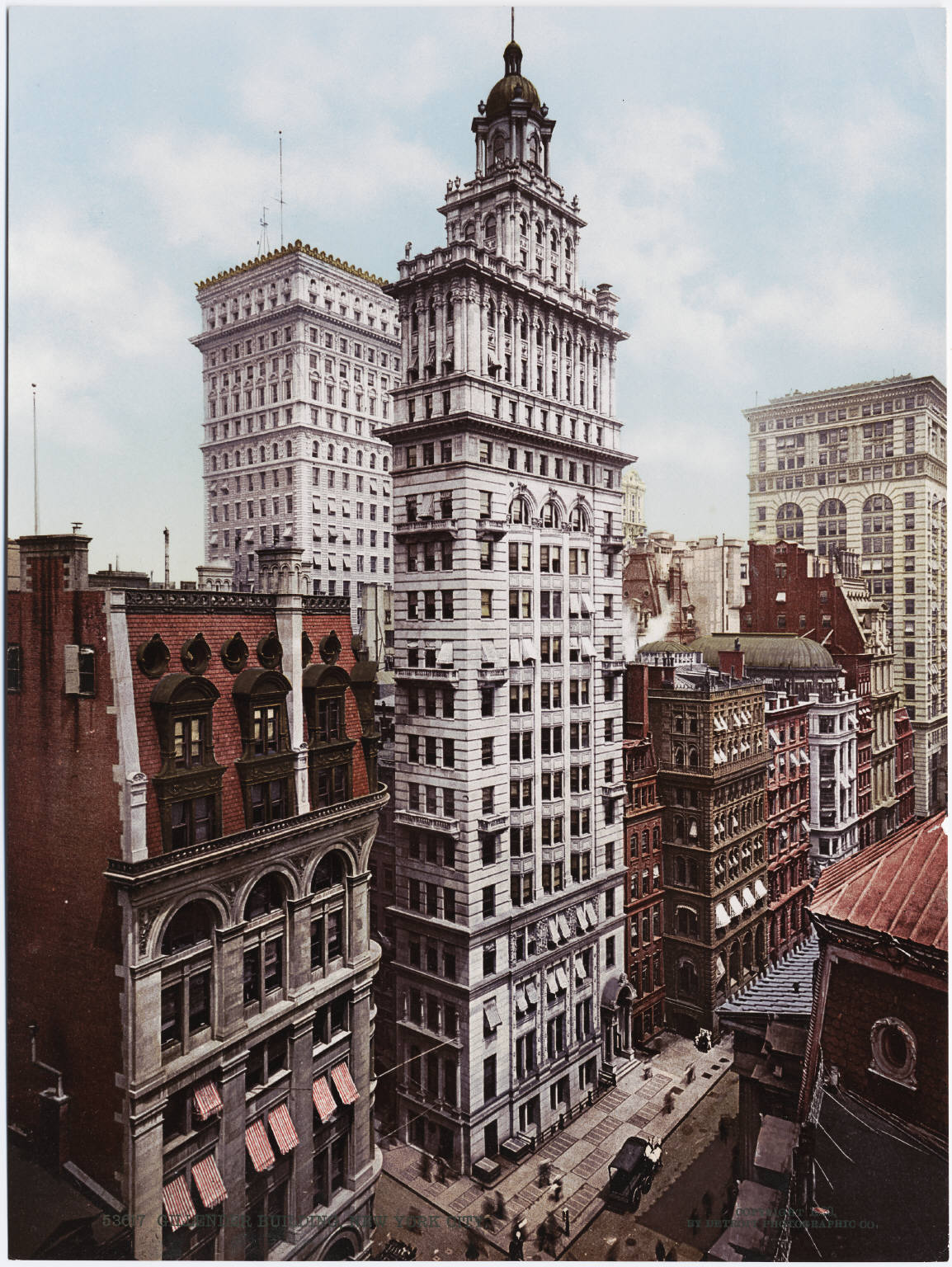
Photograph of the Gillender Building as seen from southeast

In 1909, financial institutions began rapidly expanding their properties within the Financial District. The Bankers Trust Company joined the process after the Bank of Montreal, the Fourth National Bank, and the Germania Life Insurance Company acquired their properties on Wall and Nassau Streets. Bankers Trust, which was established in 1902, had been a tenant at the Gillender Building for six years and their choice of site was motivated by its location near the New York Stock Exchange. The company, with J. P. Morgan on the board, grew rapidly and intended to land itself permanently in the "vortex of America's financial life".

In July 1909, Bankers Trust signed a long-term lease agreement with the Sampson family, owners of the Stevens Building; the company preferred leasing over purchasing due to the high price of land on Wall Street. Located on the same block as the Gillender Building, the L-shaped, seven-story Stevens Building wrapped around it and possessed far longer facades on both Wall and Nassau Streets. Initially, the press reported that Bankers Trust planned to build a 16-story office building wrapping around the Gillender Building, with the two bottom floors outfitted to be "one of the finest banking rooms in the city". Later, it was disclosed that the trust had been negotiating purchase of the Gillender Building since April 1909; the deal would have consolidated enough land for a new tower, with a roughly square footprint measuring about 100 by 100 feet (30 by 30 m). (Note: The New York Times reported that the two buildings occupied a site measuring 94 feet (29 m) on Wall Street and 102 feet (31 m) on Nassau Street. The New York City Landmarks Preservation Commission states that the site measures 97 feet (30 m) on Wall Street and 94 feet (29 m) on Nassau Street.)

The Manhattan Trust Company, a bank connected to Bankers Trust through common control by J. P. Morgan, acquired the Gillender Building from Helen Gillender Asinari in December 1909, paying approximately $1,500,000 for the 1,825-square-foot (169.5 m^{2}) property (equivalent to $53,750,000 in 2025), or $822 per foot ($2,700/m). (Note: Sources disagree on the actual cost per square foot. The figure of $822 per square foot is the most quoted figure. Other sources provided marginally different figures of $820 per foot ($2,700/m) and $825 per foot ($2,710/m). However, the Real Estate Record and Guide, reporting on this sale in 1909, quoted the cost as being between $600 and $700 per foot ($2,000 and $2,300/m), a significantly lower figure. The same publication in 1912 claimed a cost of $813 per square foot ($8,750/m^{2}).) This was considered a record amount for land in New York City: the previous record was for 1 Wall Street at the corner with Broadway, the land under which had sold for $558.65 per foot ($1,832.8/m). Negotiations had progressed since April 1909 and the sale was virtually closed in November. On January 2, 1910, the press reported that the Manhattan Trust had resold the building to Bankers Trust, which had completed land acquisition for its large corner property. By April 1910, the final cash price paid to Manhattan Trust was adjusted to $1,250,000; in exchange for the $250,000 difference, the Manhattan Trust retained long-term lease rights for the ground floor "and some other space in the building". Contemporaries agreed that the Manhattan Trust and Bankers Trust acted in accord and that the latter targeted the Gillender Building from the start. Bankers Trust absorbed Manhattan Trust Company in February 1912.

The press anticipated the upcoming demolition of the Gillender Building "as the first time when such a high-class office building representing the best type of fire-proof construction" would be torn down and "one of the largest building operations ever undertaken in New York". The Engineering News-Record said that "the case is the more notable because the Gillender Building is of unusual proportions, being very narrow and for its width exceptionally high." Bankers Trust publicized the drafts by Trowbridge & Livingston to build a 39-story tower that, when announced, would be New York City's third tallest building after the Metropolitan Life Insurance Company Tower and the Singer Building. At the time, the Gillender Building was the tallest building ever demolished voluntarily.

=== Demolition ===
The Gillender and Stevens buildings (in red) and their replacement at 14 Wall Street, looking from the Nassau Street elevation

The contract to demolish the Gillender Building was awarded to Jacob Volk, known for his work on the McAdoo Tunnel, who himself claimed experience in demolishing 900 buildings. The steelwork demolition contract was sublet to Charles M. Seacomb. Initially, Volk subscribed to complete the job in 35 days and pay a $500 penalty for each day delayed, though the schedule was later extended to 45 days. Demolition was preceded with erection of a massive timber canopy over the sidewalks on Nassau and Wall Streets, and a thick wire mesh over the respective streets to protect people from falling debris. Inside, elevator shafts were converted into garbage chutes for the torn partitions and exterior masonry scrap. Openings about 10 feet (3.0 m) square were cut through the floors of all stories above the fourth, allowing demolition contractors to deposit garbage.

Demolition of the Stevens Building commenced in the beginning of April 1910, and that of the Gillender Building commenced on April 29, 1910. Material from the building was preserved as much as possible for reuse. The windows, doors, trim, interior fittings, and pipes were carefully removed, the window openings boarded up, and the floorboards removed and preserved as secondhand lumber. The copper sheeting and terracotta backing were carefully removed with steel derricks, leaving only the steel frame standing. Most of the steel in the Gillender Building was found to be relatively free of oxidation, with a few exception, as the frame was protected by the exterior terracotta cladding. Two hundred and fifty men were involved in the demolition project during the daytime, and a hundred during the night. Of these, two Italian workers were injured by falling girders, one of whom subsequently died in the hospital. The New York Times described the demolition thus:

The famous Gillender Building, which when erected twelve years ago on the northwest corner of Nassau and Wall Streets was called the tallest skyscraper in the world, its tower rising some 300 feet above the streets, has gone the way of other landmarks

— The New York Times, June 17, 1910

The work was timed so that the deconstruction of the steel frame was no more than two stories behind that of the brickwork. By May 2, the cupola was dismantled completely and most of the cupola masonry was removed, exposing its steel skeleton. The Times said that Volk "strode over busted balustrades like an admiral on his bridge, barking through a megaphone at his crew." The steel had gone down to the thirteenth-story ceiling by May 13. By the end of May, most of the Stevens Building was torn down; the Gillender Building's masonry walls were removed down to the seventh floor and steel skeleton was down to the eleventh floor. The demolition allowed observers the opportunity to look at the steel structure, and architectural historians Sarah Landau and Carl Condit characterized the opportunity as "the only useful aspect of the Gillender's demolition". By June 12, all that remained of the Gillender Building was a single level of its steel frame visible above protective scaffolding.

Demolition was officially completed June 16, 1910, one day ahead of schedule, although work on its underground foundations did not commence until a month later. One journal reported that "...all previous records for rapid work were surpassed" and that "every vestige of [the Gillender Building] had disappeared" by the time work was completed. Another said that the Gillender Building was "only the second high modern building to be taken down", both in the city and in the world, following the Pabst Hotel in Times Square (demolished 1902). It had cost Bankers Trust $50,000 plus $500 for advance completion; the contractor also received all the scrap, valued at $25,000. The granite slabs from the Gillender Building were recycled into tombstones of the Green-Wood Cemetery in Brooklyn.

The Bankers Trust Company Building, now known as 14 Wall Street, was completed in 1912, becoming the tallest banking building in the world. The bank occupied only the three lower floors; its main operations were housed elsewhere in less expensive offices. In 1931, Bankers Trust acquired and demolished the adjacent Hanover, Astor, and Pine Street Buildings, and replaced them with an annex to the original Bankers Trust Building. The annex was completed in 1933, tripling its rentable area.

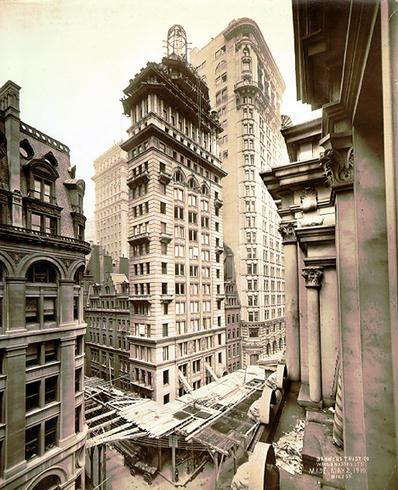
Top floors and spire

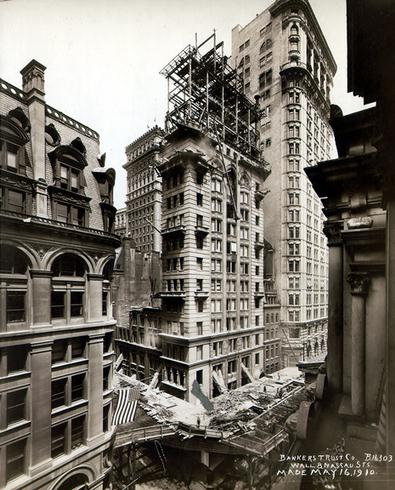
Higher elevations

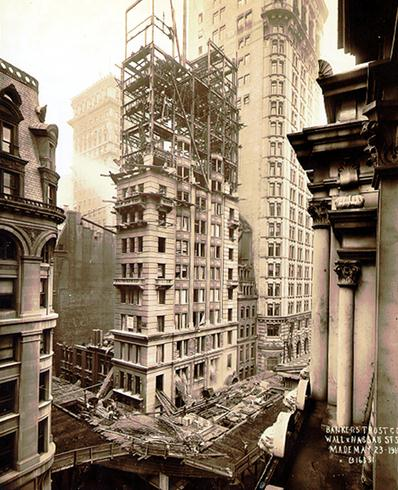
Midsections

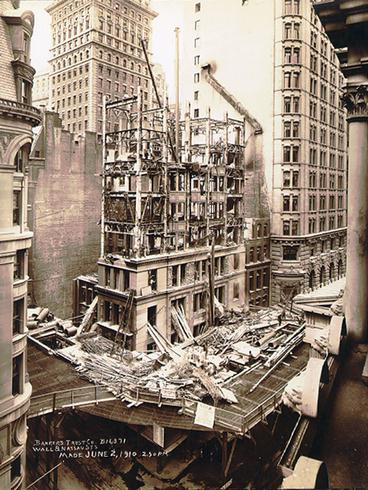
Lower sections

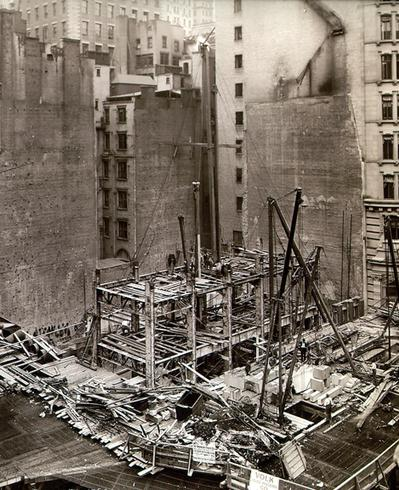
Final demolition

== In media ==
The Gillender Building is the site of a final scene in Jed Rubenfeld's The Interpretation of Murder, a 2006 novel reconstructing Sigmund Freud's 1909 visit to New York. The narrator and Nora Acton (linked to Freud's case study of Dora) meet for the last time in the Gillender cupola, watch the New York skyline, well aware that the building will be soon torn down.

In M. K. Hobson's Hotel Astarte, The Warlock "had his fingernails polished by a mute Chinese woman he kept in locked in a small room in his office on the top floor of the Gillender Building on Wall Street". The story is set in June 1910 and in October 1929, both after the Gillender Building had already been dismantled.
