= Trinity Court Building (1879–1926) =

Demolished building in Manhattan, New York

Trinity Court Building (I)
- Interactive map of the Trinity Court Building (I) area

General information
- Location: 76 Trinity Place; Financial District, Manhattan, New York
- Coordinates: 40°42′31″N 74°00′46″W
- Completed: 1879
- Demolished: 1926

Height
- Height: 33.2 m (109 ft)

The Trinity Court Building was a building in Lower Manhattan, New York City.

== History ==
The earliest building to carry the name was built in 1879 for the Western Union Telegraph Company. It had six stories, 5,000 square feet of space, stores on the ground floor, and commercial lofts in the rest. None of the sides were of equal length; the front facade was 104.4 feet (31.8 m) long and the other facades measured 42.4 feet (12.9 m), 108.9 feet (33.2 m), and 52 feet (16 m).

Western Union sold it in 1888. The building was the focus of a complex tort in the 1890s over property value loss due to the operation of the Manhattan Elevated Railroad (later IRT Sixth Avenue Line) in front of it. The builder (Western Union) and the defendant (railway) were both controlled by the same group of investors, who were asserted to be in collusion against buyer Augustus D. Shepard to nullify any damages collected. Mutual Life Assurance foreclosed on the building in 1914, and auctioned it to Alliance Realty. It was sold in 1919 to Frazar & Co, which was believed to have had plans to replace it with a new skyscraper.

The building was demolished in 1926. It was built in place the Trinity Court Building (1927–2015) (II).
