= Isaac Stern House =

Demolished house in Manhattan, New York

Coordinates: 40.76949°N 73.96918°W

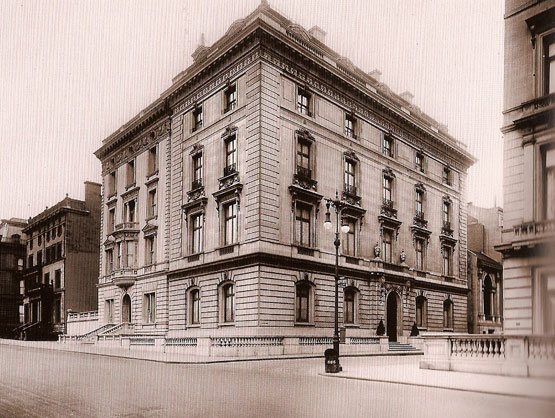
- The Isaac Stern House can be seen immediately to the left of the George J. Gould House on the corner
- Interactive map of the Isaac Stern House area

General information
- Location: Manhattan, New York City
- Opened: before 1910
- Demolished: 1949

Design and construction
- Architect: Schickel & Ditmars

The Isaac Stern House was a mansion at 858 Fifth Avenue on the Upper East Side of Manhattan in New York City.

== History ==
The home was designed by the firm of Schickel & Ditmars, and it was constructed for the entrepreneur Isaac Stern (d. 1910). He was one of the founders of the Stern Brothers department store and was the father of Robert B. Stearns, who became a prominent financier and co-founded Bear Stearns in 1923. The mansion was later owned by businessman Thomas Fortune Ryan. The house was demolished in 1949 to make way for an apartment building.
