= Sarah Landau =

American architectural historian (1935–2023)

Sarah Bradford Landau (1935 – 4 February 2023) was an architectural historian who taught for many years in the Department of Art History at New York University.

== Education ==
Landau earned her B.F.A. at the University of North Carolina (1957). She earned her Ph.D. (1978) from New York University Institute of Fine Arts, where she was a student of Henry-Russell Hitchcock, the noted architectural historian. Her dissertation chronicled the work of the architects Henry Tuckerman Potter and William Appleton Potter.

== Career ==
Landau taught in the Department of Art History at New York University from 1976-2007. For nine years (1987-1996) she served as a member of the New York City Landmarks Preservation Commission.

== Selected publications ==
- George B. Post, Architect: Picturesque Designer and Determined Realist, Monacelli Press, New York 1998; ISBN 978-1-885254-92-4
- with Carl W. Condit, Rise of the New York Skyscraper, 1865-1913, Yale University Press, New Haven 1996; ISBN 0-300-06444-6
- with Jan Cigliano (editors), The Grand American Avenue, 1850 to 1920, Pomegranate Artbooks, San Francisco; American Architectural Foundation, Washington DC 1994.
- P.B. Wight: Architect, Contractor, and Critic 1838-1925, Art Institute of Chicago, Chicago 1981.
- Edward T. and William A. Potter, American Victorian Architects, Garland Publishing, New York and London 1979.
- The Row Houses of New York's West Side. J Soc Architectural Historians 34(1):19-36 (1975)

== Awards ==
Landau had won numerous awards including the American Institute of Architects International Architecture Book Award (1997), the Victorian Society in America Book Award (1997), the Lucy G. Moses Award for Preservation Leadership, New York Landmarks Conservancy (1997) and designation as a Centennial Historian of the City of New York (1999).
