= Gilsey Building =

Commercial building in Manhattan, New York (1854–1927)

Coordinates: 40.7097°N 74.0104°W

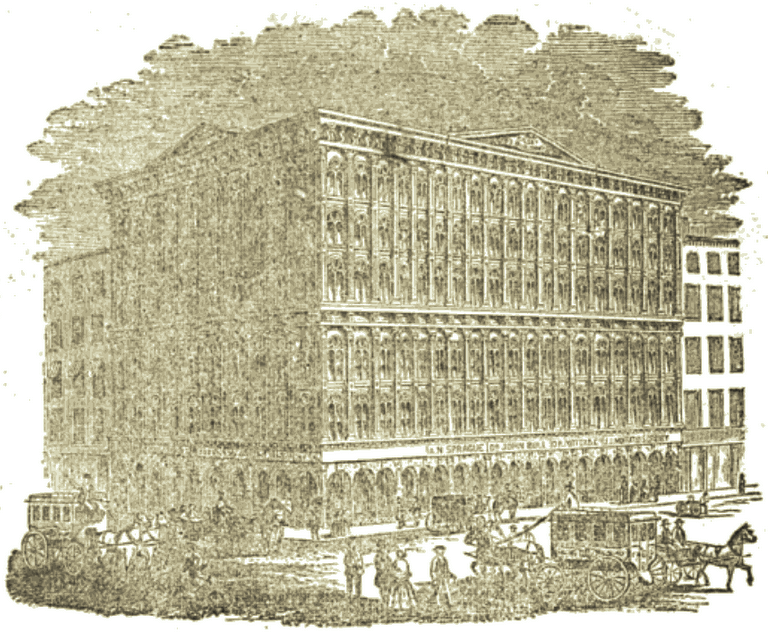
Gilsey's Building (1859)

Gilsey Building (also known as the Benedict Building) was a commercial building in Manhattan, New York City. It was completed in 1854 and demolished in May 1927. The building was located in the south corner of Cortlandt Street, west side of Broadway, at 169-171 Broadway, situated diagonally across from the Howard Hotel. Its proprietor, Peter Gilsey, has acquired a fortune in the cigar business, and also owned Gilsey House. The material was iron, and the color was white. The building's location made the numerous law and business offices among the most desirable in the city. It was a real estate holdout, forcing construction of the City Investing Building to wrap around it. The Gilsey Building was the first iron frame building erected in New York City.

== History ==
It was first called the Gilsey Building, having been built by Peter Gilsey, then a noted tobacco and cigar dealer. Gilsey had been on the brink of suicide because of despondency over hard luck. He rose from a street peddler to be a millionaire, and became closely associated with the growth of New York in the latter half of the 19th century. His hotel, the Gilsey House, stood for years at the corner of 29th Street and Broadway.

This was the first iron frame building erected in New York. The building had been considered a landmark in the Maiden Lane district. It was originally a two-story structure, but later several more floors were added, making it into a six-story structure. When built, it was without elevators and for years, those having business in the building were compelled to use the stairway, climbing sometimes as high as the fifth floor.

The idea of fashioning the frame-work of buildings of iron pillars and beams was not new, but no one in New York was daring enough to experiment with it until Peter Gilsey determined to build at Broadway and Cortlandt Street, which was then one of the busiest street intersections in the lower part of the city. Gilsey had tried unsuccessfully to buy the land, which was then owned by John H. G. Pell of 60 E. 36th Street, and a Miss Wessells, who afterwards married Mr. Pell.

They refused to sell and the land remained a part of the Pell estate. Gilsey took a long lease, employed an architect of advanced ideas to plan an iron frame building and began operations. He had already agreed to lease the corner store to Benedict Brothers, jewelers, and the store next adjoining on the south to John Forsythe, the haberdasher.

While the building was going up, it was one of the free shows of New York. Idle crowds surrounded the Benedict building, as it was called from the start. The work was slow. It was necessary to teach ironworkers to bolt the pillars and beams together. The iron units were very heavy and were hoisted to their positions by hand derricks and placed in position by main strength. One of the features of the operation that attracted attention was the widespread belief in the city that at some stage of the work the whole structure would topple over. Momentarily, the crowd expected to see it crumble. Perhaps there was a feeling of disappointment among old-timers when the structure was completed and the tenants moved in.

From the time the building was erected until a few days before wreckers started to tear down the structure, it housed many jewelry concerns. Gilsey conducted for many years a cigar stand under the stairway on the ground floor.

It was demolished in May 1927.
