= Alfanus =

Alfanus, Alphanus or Alfano may refer to:

- Alfanus I, physician, archbishop of Salerno (1058–1085)
- Alfanus II, archbishop of Salerno (1086–1121)
- Alfanus of Camerota, archbishop of Capua (1158–1180)

== See also ==
- Alfano, a village and comune in Salerno, Campania, Italy
- Alfano (surname)
