= Alfano (surname) =

Alfano is an Italian surname. Notable people with the surname include:

- Angelino Alfano (born 1970), Italian politician
- Enrico Alfano (1869 or 1870-unknown), Italian mobster
- Franco Alfano (1875–1954), Italian composer
- Graciela Alfano (born 1952), Argentine model
- JoAnn Alfano, American television producer
- Robert Alfano, American physicist
- Thomas Alfano (born 1959), American politician
- Vanessa Alfano (born 1976), American television journalist
- Vincenzo Alfano (1850 – c. 1897), Italian sculptor
