= Cortlandt Street (Manhattan) =

Street in Manhattan, New York

Coordinates: 40°42′36″N 74°00′38″W

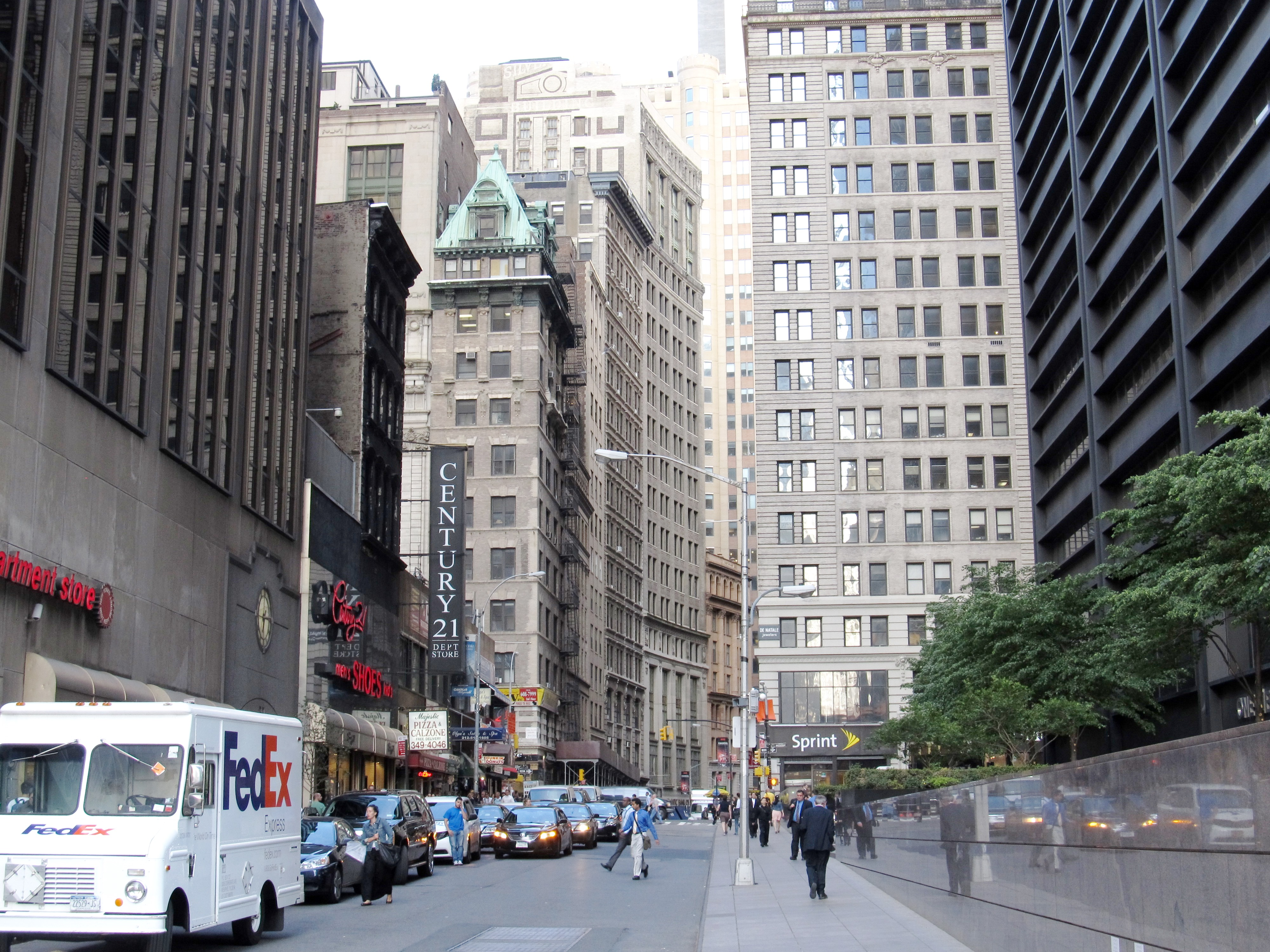
Looking east down Cortlandt Street from One Liberty Plaza; the building with the green mansard roof is 174 Broadway, also known as 1 Maiden Lane. When Cortlandt Street crosses Broadway it becomes Maiden Lane.

Cortlandt Street is a west-east street in the Financial District of Lower Manhattan, New York City. It runs one block from Broadway to Church Street, then continues an additional block as the non-vehicular Cortlandt Way from Church to Greenwich Street. At its eastern end, the street continues as Maiden Lane.

The street, which was laid out c. 1735, has varied in length over time. During the early 20th century it was the site of Radio Row, a small business district specializing in the sale and repair of radios. All except one block was razed in the mid-1960s for the construction of the World Trade Center. After the destruction of the original World Trade Center in the September 11 attacks, Cortlandt Way opened in 2012 as part of the new World Trade Center.

== History ==
The street is named after Oloff Van Cortlandt and his family. Van Cortlandt, who arrived in New Amsterdam in 1637, was a rich brewer and leading citizen of the colony – he was burgomaster from 1655 to 1666 – and owned the land on which the street was laid. His son Stephanus Van Cortlandt was the mayor of New York from 1677 to 1678, and again from 1686 to 1688. He was the city's first native-born mayor. Stephanus' brother Jacobus Van Cortlandt was mayor from 1710 to 1711 and from 1719 to 1720. Both served under British rule. (Note: The family's name also appears on Van Cortlandt Park in the Bronx, the land of which was given to Jacobus' wife, Eva, by her adoptive father, Frederick Philipse. The land was bought from their descendants by New York City and turned into a park in 1888.)

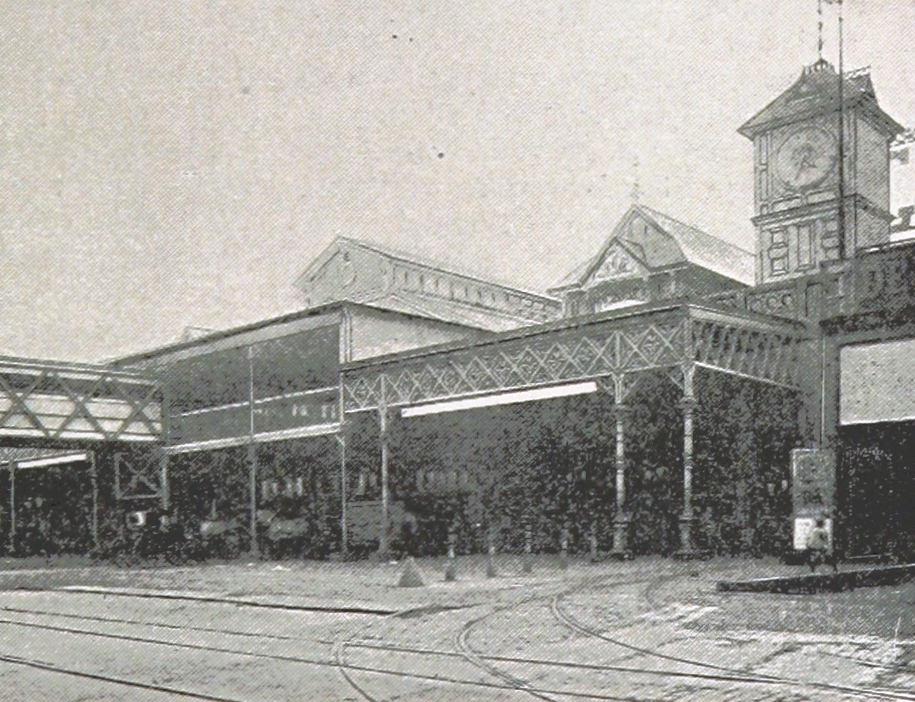
The Cortlandt Street Ferry Depot in 1893

The street has existed since before the American Revolution. Of the numerous extant maps of the city, it first appears in "Mrs. Buchnerd's Plan" which depicts the colony in 1732-35, however it does not appear on the "Carwitham Plan" of 1730 or the "Lyne-Bradford Plan" from 1731. Prior to that time, the land on which Cortlandt Street would be laid was the southern border of Trinity Church's "Church Farm" – previously known as the "King's Farm" – which went as far north as what is now Christopher Street. (Note: Later, in 1762, the church's vestry would have that land surveyed and laid out in a grid pattern of streets – one of the earliest uses of the grid in Manhattan – on which they offered plots to artisans and laborers at very affordable rents.)

The Unitarian preacher John Butler rented a hall on Cortlandt Street in 1794 and lectured before crowds that his critics considered to be "truly alarming" in size. He was opposed by mainstream preachers, who vehemently criticized him in their sermons.

In 1807, Robert Fulton began scheduled ferry service from the foot of Cortlandt Street to Albany, New York via the Hudson River. The boat, initially called the North River Steamboat, later became known as the Clermont. Ferries also ran from the Cortlandt Street Ferry Depot to New Jersey.

Herman Melville's family lived on Cortlandt Street from around 1821 to 1824, during Melville's childhood, as part of their rise in status in the city after their relocation from Boston, where Melville's father was a successful merchant.

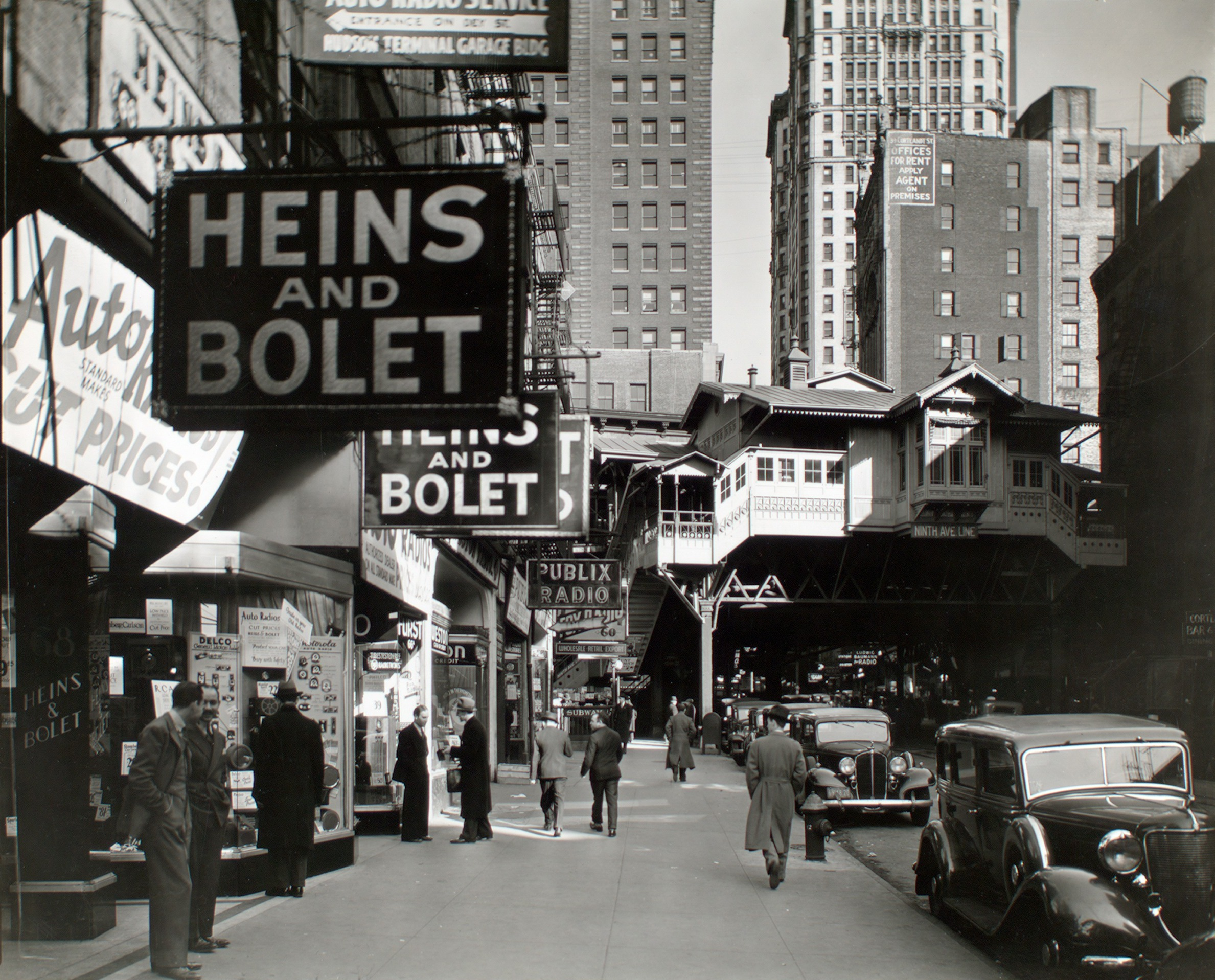
Radio Row in 1936, photographed by Berenice Abbott

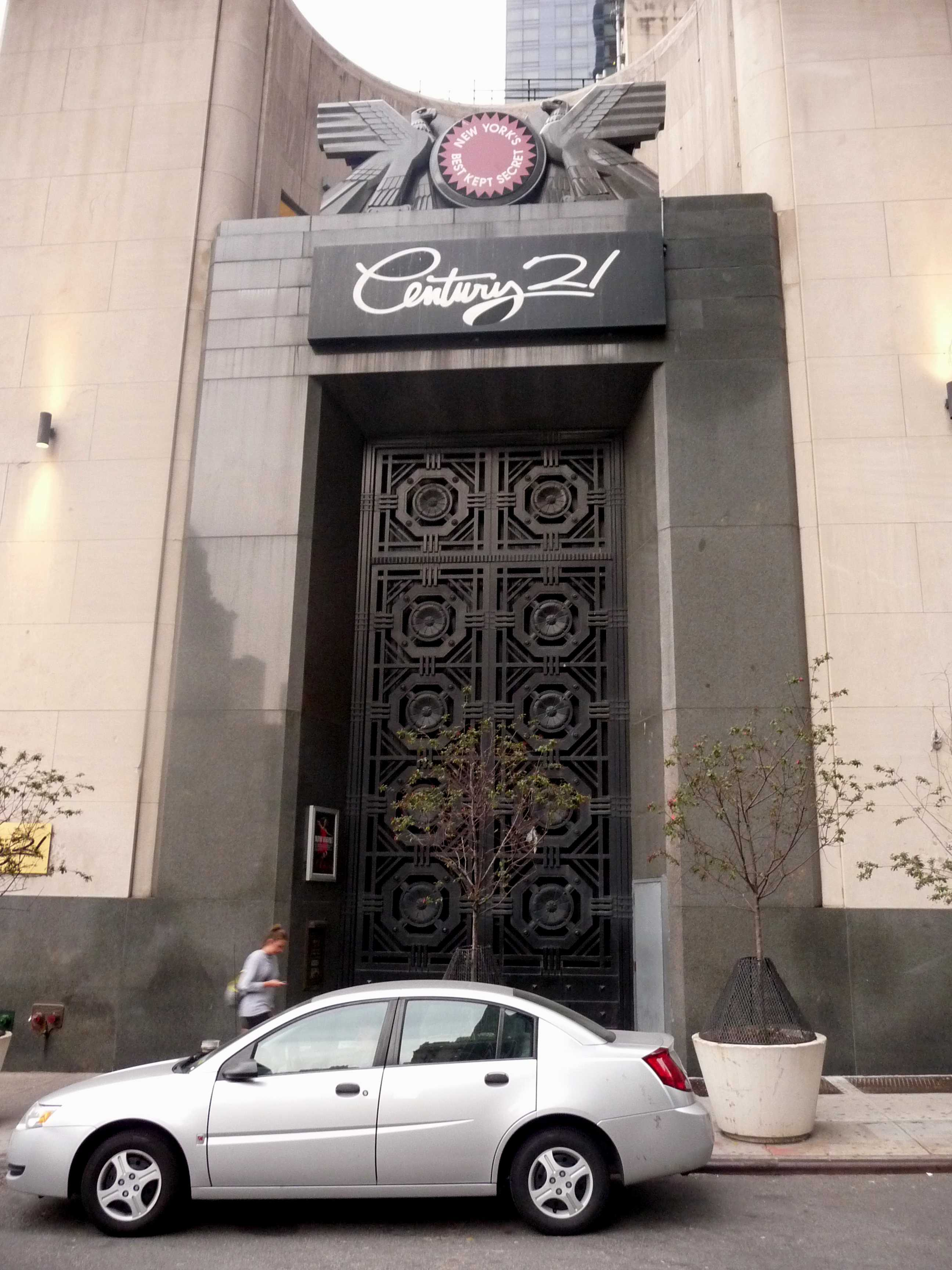
The former entrance to the East River Savings Bank

In 1887, the Brill Brothers men's clothing store chain opened its first store at 45 Cortlandt Street. Max and Maurice Brill, whose name is on the Brill Building in midtown, expanded the one store into a chain of eight. Down the block, at 41 Cortlandt Street, the first Childs Restaurant was opened in 1889.

Business owner and entrepreneur Harry L. Schneck opened City Radio on Cortlandt Street in 1921. This was a small business that sold radios and radio parts, which at the time was quite a novelty. Over the following decades, the area developed into a business district in its own right, becoming known as Radio Row.

In 1966, the Radio Row district was demolished and its streets were de-mapped to make way for the construction of the World Trade Center. Cortlandt Street, which until then ran to West Street, was cut back to Church Street, making it only one block long. In 1968, both the City Investing Building on Cortlandt Street and the Singer Building on Liberty Street were demolished to make way for One Liberty Plaza, a full-block 54-story office tower. 22 Cortlandt Street was built directly across from it and both projects were overseen by the Emery Roth & Sons architecture firm.

After the September 11 attacks in 2001, the Port Authority of New York and New Jersey, which had operated the World Trade Center, decided to redevelop the street grid within the World Trade Center site. One of the rebuilding proposals included building an enclosed shopping street along the path of Cortlandt Street that lay within the World Trade Center site. However, it was ultimately decided to build Cortlandt, Fulton, and Greenwich Streets, which had been destroyed during the original World Trade Center's construction. The de-mapped portion of Cortlandt Street was re-mapped as "Cortlandt Way" in 2014 as part of the development of the new World Trade Center. The newly opened portion, which is not accessible to vehicles, lies between Three and Four World Trade Center.

== Buildings ==
Located at 26 Cortlandt Street is the Neo-classical/Art Deco former East River Savings Bank building, designed by Walker & Gillette and built from 1931 to 1934; it was later expanded upwards. The building is listed in the AIA Guide to New York City. It is now a Century 21 department store.

== Transportation ==
Cortlandt Street is the location of subway stations on the IRT Broadway-Seventh Avenue Line (1 train) and the BMT Broadway Line (N, R, and W trains). The IRT station was destroyed as a result of the September 11 attacks, and reopened in September 2018. The BMT station was closed for a year after the attacks, and then again in 2005 to allow for construction of various parts of the new World Trade Center, including a passageway linking the station to the Fulton Center. The northbound platform re-opened in 2009 followed by the southbound in 2011.

There were formerly stations at Cortlandt Street on the Ninth Avenue and Sixth Avenue elevated lines. A ferry depot, the Cortlandt Street Ferry Depot, formerly operated at the western end of Cortlandt Street along the Hudson River.

There is no bus route on Cortlandt Street. The M55 intersects on Church Street uptown and Broadway downtown.
