= One Liberty Plaza =

Office skyscraper in Manhattan, New York

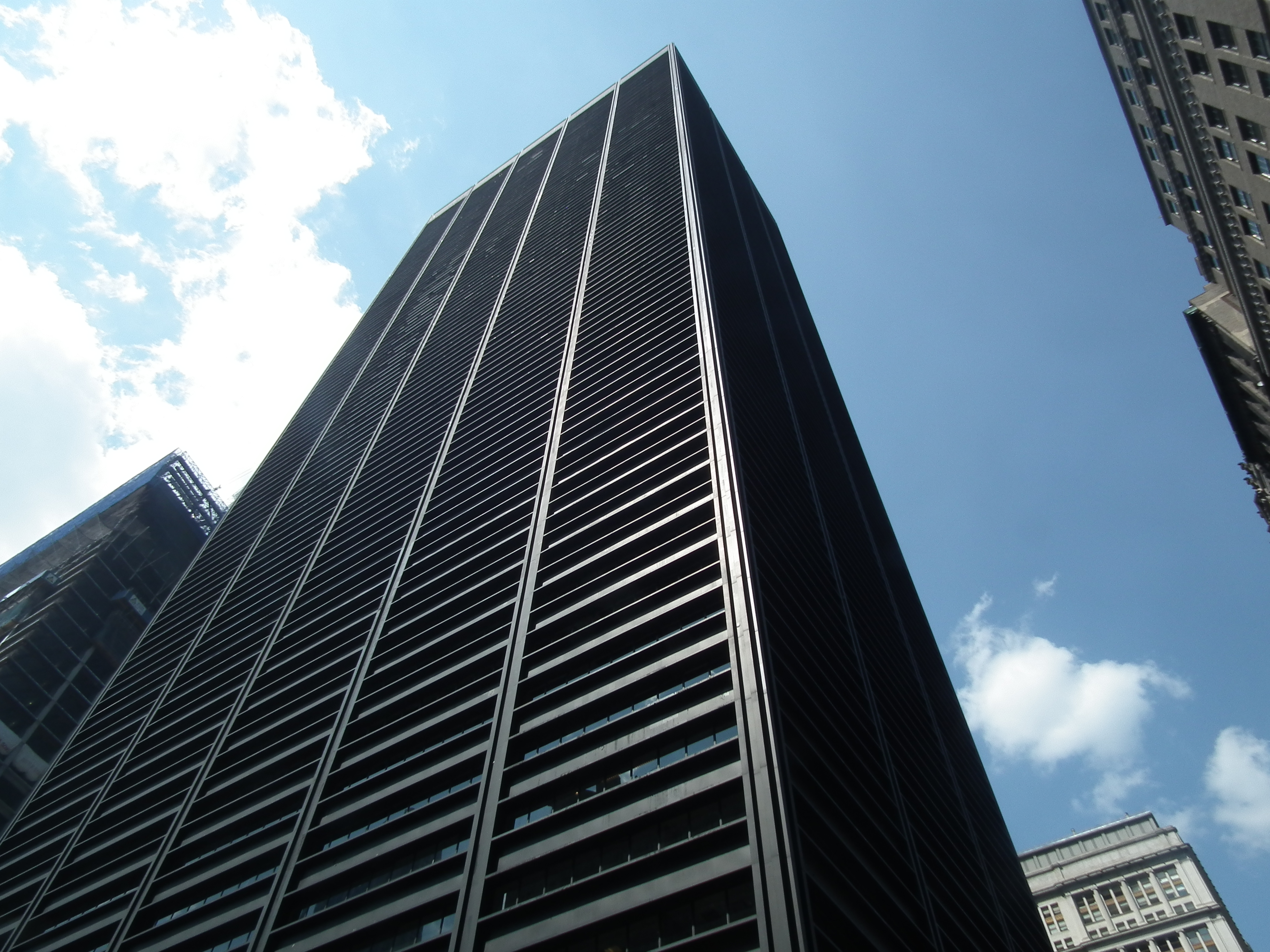
- One Liberty Plaza in 2011, Four World Trade Center can be seen during construction.
- Interactive map of the One Liberty Plaza area

General information
- Status: Completed
- Type: Commercial; office
- Architectural style: International Style
- Location: 165 Broadway; New York City, New York; United States 10006
- Coordinates: 40°42′35″N 74°00′39″W
- Construction started: 1969
- Completed: 1972
- Opening: 1973
- Cost: $120 million
- Owner: Brookfield Properties (51%); Blackstone (49%)

Height
- Roof: 743 ft (226 m)

Technical details
- Floor count: 54
- Floor area: 2,346,000 ft^{2} (218,000 m^{2})
- Lifts/elevators: 39

Design and construction
- Architect: Roy Allen (Skidmore, Owings and Merrill)
- Developer: Galbreath-Ruffin Corporation, U.S. Steel Corporation
- Structural engineer: Paul Weidlinger/Weiskopf & Pickworth LLP
- Main contractor: Turner Construction Company

One Liberty Plaza, formerly the U.S. Steel Building, is a skyscraper in the Financial District of Lower Manhattan in New York City. It is situated on a block bounded by Broadway, Liberty Street, Church Street, and Cortlandt Street, on the sites of the former Singer Building and City Investing Building.

The building was designed in the International Style by Skidmore, Owings & Merrill and completed in 1973. It is 743 ft (226 m) tall and has 54 floors. At 2.3 million sq ft (210,000 m^{2}), each floor offers almost 1 acre (0.40 ha) of office space, making it one of the largest office buildings in New York by usable interior space. Its facade is black, consisting of a structural steel frame. South of the building is Zuccotti Park, formerly called Liberty Plaza Park.

One Liberty Plaza was originally commissioned by U.S. Steel, and also housed the headquarters of Merrill Lynch. Since 2001, One Liberty Plaza has been owned and operated by Brookfield Properties.

== History ==
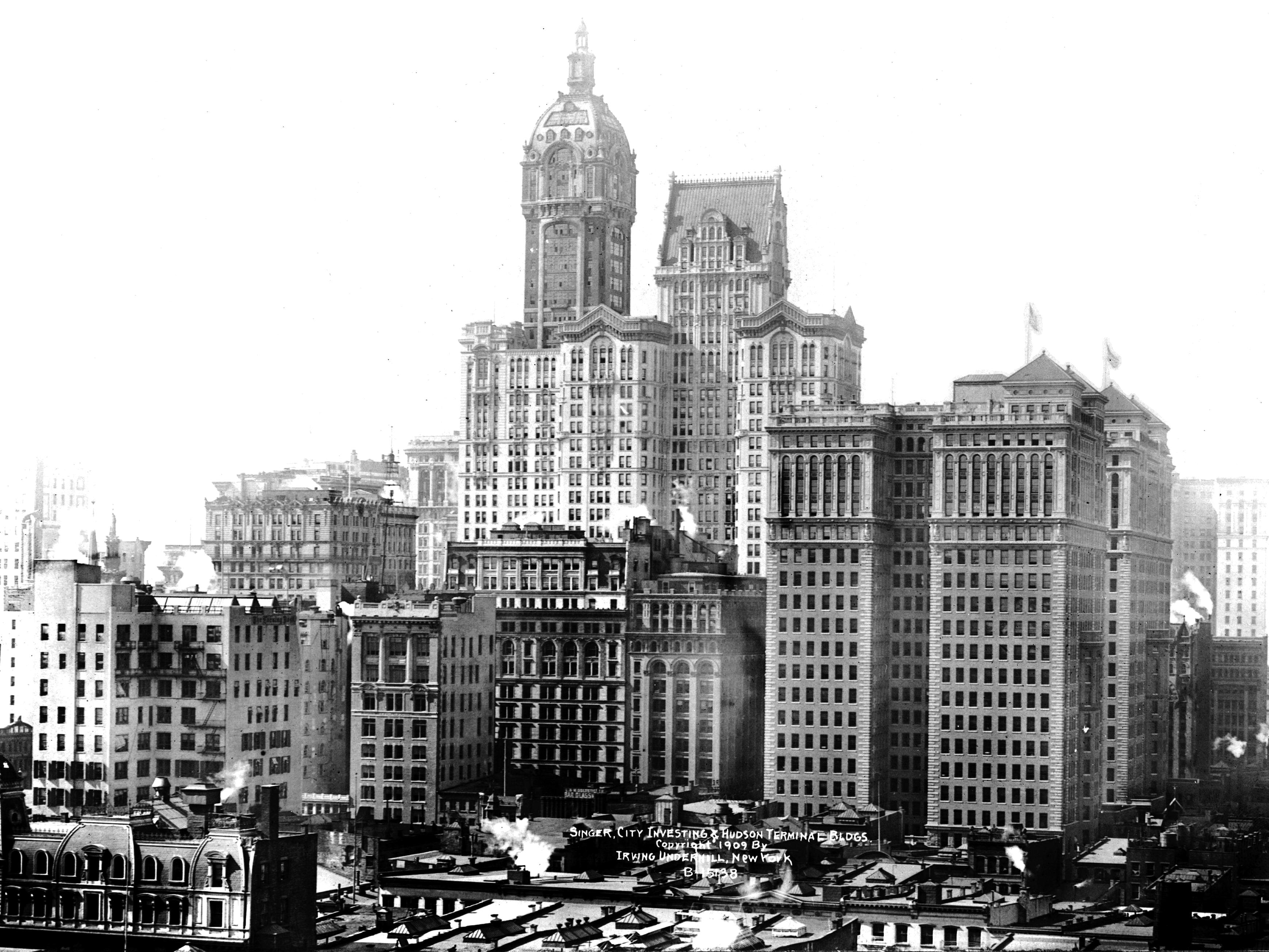
Predecessors at the site, demolished to make way for One Liberty Plaza: Singer Building (tallest tower in the center of the image) and City Investing Building (second tallest, with slanted roof)

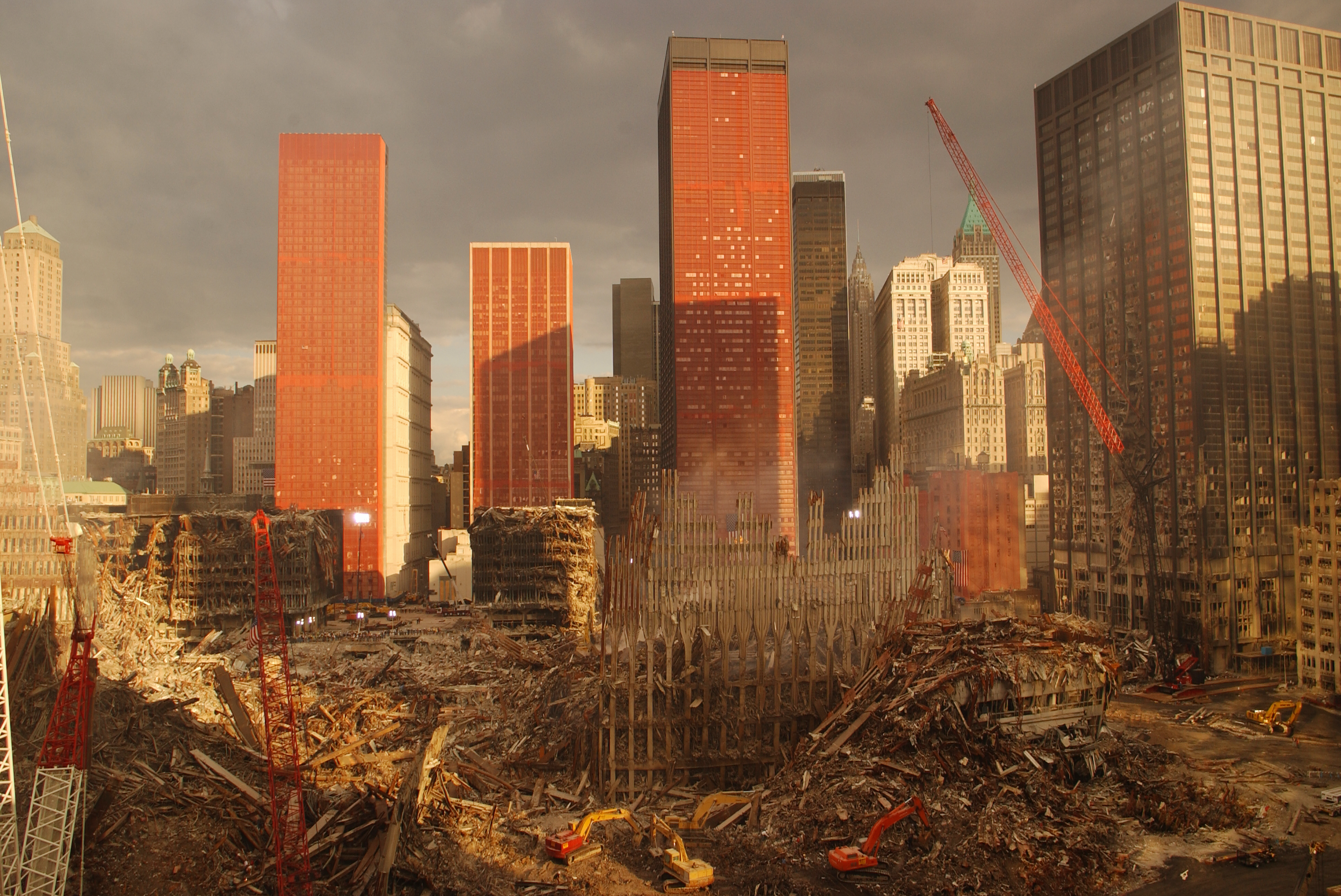
Image of the World Trade Center site, facing One Liberty Plaza, 17 days after the September 11 attacks.

The Singer Building, the tallest in the world from 1908 to 1909, and the City Investing Building adjacent to it were demolished from 1967 to 1968 to clear land for One Liberty Plaza's construction. One Liberty Plaza had more than twice the interior area of the two former buildings combined.

In 1972, Merrill Lynch became an anchor tenant in the building, occupying 40 floors in the building and acquiring 25% ownership of the building. By the early 1980s, Merrill Lynch owned the entire building, purchased for $100 million. By 1984, the company was outgrowing the space and relocated to the nearby World Financial Center. Merrill Lynch sold One Liberty Plaza for $375 million to Olympia and York, developer of the nearby World Financial Center. After selling the building, Merrill Lynch continued to lease space at One Liberty Plaza, occupying 20 floors.

The building had a substantial renovation in 1989, which involved the creation of a new lobby and elevator system. The lobby and elevators have an extensive security system, and the building has a connection to the New York City Subway's Fulton Street/Fulton Center station (2, 3, 4, 5, A, C, E, J, N, R, W, and Z trains) in the basement.

In 2001, Brookfield Properties bought the property for $432 million. Following the September 11 attacks, and the subsequent collapse of the World Trade Center nearby, One Liberty Plaza sustained significant facade damage. At one point there was a rumor going around that the building was in danger of collapse. These claims were quickly refuted by The New York Times:

There are no structural concerns with this building," said Ilyse Fink, the director of communications for the city's Department of Buildings, reinforcing a message she has delivered almost daily since Sept. 12. "It is not and was not in danger of collapse. The building is structurally sound."

It was planned to reopen the building to office workers with a ribbon cutting ceremony on October 22, 2001. But the day before it was to happen, it was decided that it was not yet sufficiently safe for employees to return to the office tower. The tower reopened on October 24, two days after originally scheduled.

In 2016 it was the 656th tallest building in the world.

Morgan Stanley placed a $784 million loan on the tower in August 2017 and placed a partial ownership stake on sale for $1.6 billion two months later. That December, Brookfield sold a 49% stake in the tower to Blackstone, valuing the tower at $1.55 billion. Brookfield and Blackstone considered selling the building in 2020 for up to $1.7 billion. The sale ultimately did not occur, and June 2024, Brookfield refinanced the building with $750 million from Morgan Stanley.

== Tenants ==
Tenants at One Liberty Plaza include the international law firm Cleary Gottlieb Steen & Hamilton, which has been at One Liberty Plaza since 1990.. Other tenants include Avon Products, Wasserman Music, Cambridge University Press, Aon, the New York City Economic Development Corporation, and Business Insider. Convene also operates meeting and events space at One Liberty Plaza. Previous tenants have included RBC Capital Markets, Scotiabank, and the Lower Manhattan Development Corporation.

Brooks Brothers occupied street-level retail space at One Liberty Plaza, from 1976 until 2018.

== See also ==
- List of tallest buildings in New York City
- List of tallest buildings in the United States
