= Vincenzo Alfano =

Italian sculptor

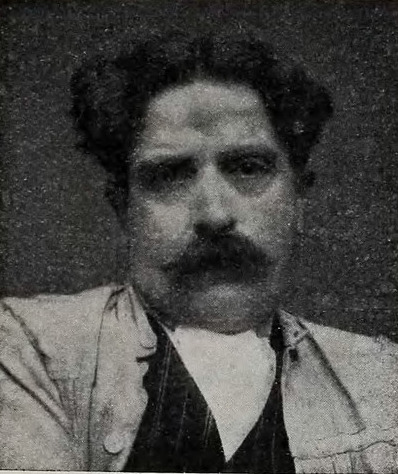
- Born: 29 November 1850; Naples
- Died: 1918
- Occupation: Sculptor

Vincenzo Alfano (Naples, 1850—c. 1917) was an Italian sculptor.

== Biography ==
He is said to have studied both painting and sculpture at the Neapolitan Academy of Fine Arts in Naples, Italy, under Morelli and Palizzi. He emigrated to America in 1898, and in 1902 he was commissioned to sculpt the monumental sculptural groups for the entryways inside the main vestibule of the Pennsylvania State Capitol in Harrisburg. He also created the medallion (1903) depicting the shield of the United States in the front exterior of United States Customs House in New York City, with a serene head of Columbia. Alfano was named an honorary professor of the Royal Academy of Naples and was also a professor of the Industrial Museum of New York.

He was best known for his small statuettes of bronzed terra cotta depicting Neapolitan workers in folk dress. Among his works Il piccolo pescatore; La pesca a Posilipo; Bagnante rimasto al verde; Dopo la messa del villaggio; Il freddo; and Uno dei guadagni nei ragazzi napoletani. While most of his works were plebeian subjects, he also completed many busts of illustrious persons, both Italian and foreign. In Milan, in 1881, he exhibits the bronze La pesca a vongole; and two years later, the white metal statuette titled Lo sbadiglio. In Turin, in 1884, he exhibited a bronze nightlight depicting: Una serenata; two small heads; and a bronze statuette titled The Fifth Sin. In 1887, in Venice, he displayed: a bronze David; In salotto; Tacchino; and L'acque del Scrino in Naples.

Alfano was also featured in the exhibition of Gemito e la scultura a Napoli tra Otto e Novecento, held in the Spazio espositivo Ernesto Galeffi of Montevarchi, Italy in 2012.
