= List of former stock exchanges in the Americas =

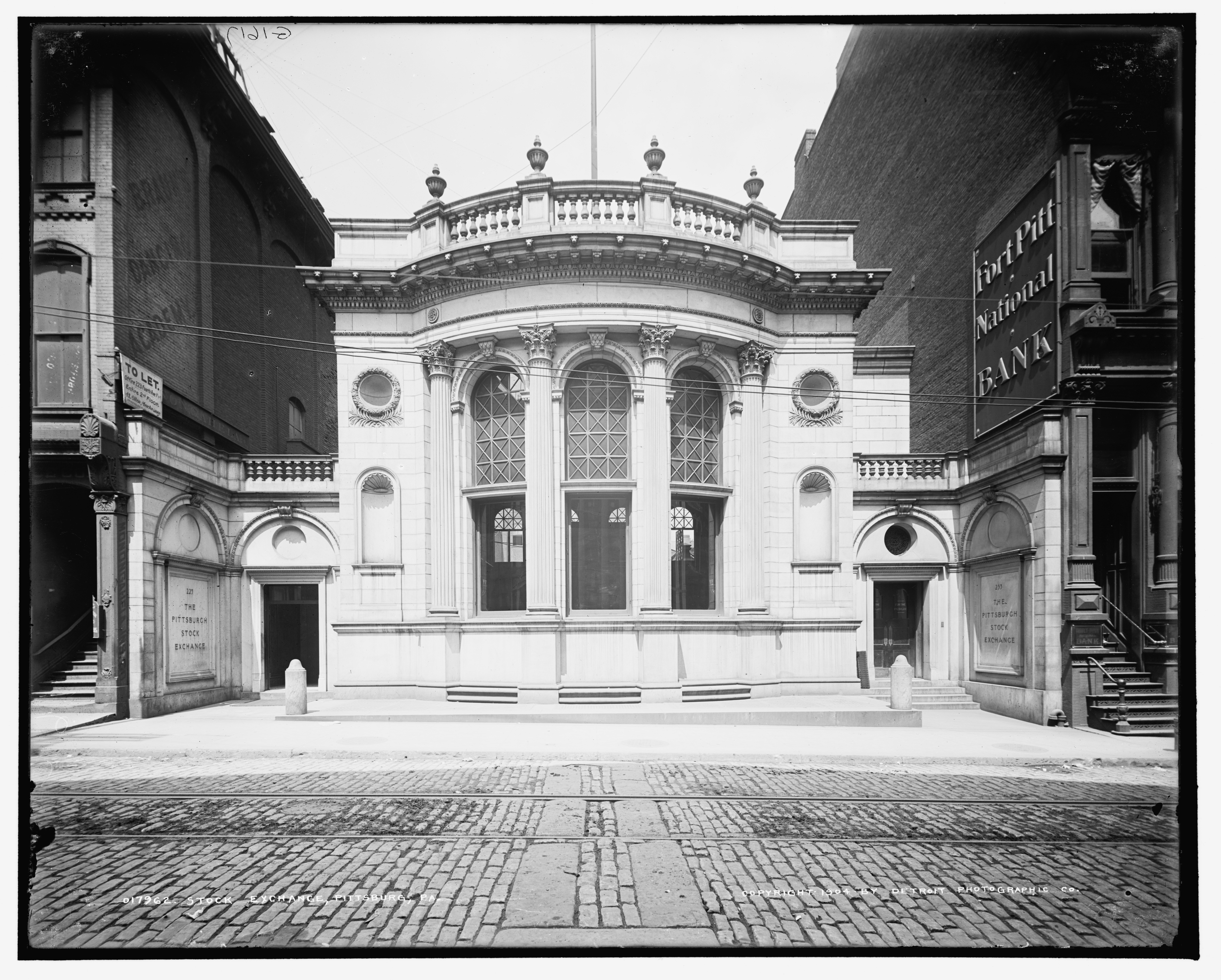
The Pittsburgh Stock Exchange building circa 1904.

This is a list of former stock exchanges in the Americas, including North America, South America, and the Caribbean Islands. Year of formation and the year the exchange was acquired, liquidated, or folded are also included. Some of these exchanges remain active as subsidiaries or divisions of other current exchanges (see current stock exchanges in the Americas). See regional stock exchanges for a related list of American stock exchanges, both active and defunct.

When the SEC formed in 1934, a total of 24 securities exchanges registered with the SEC, while 19 received temporary exemptions from registration. Ten stock exchanges closed after the SEC was created, while others decided to stop trading in securities. The National Stock Exchange ceased trading operations on May 30, 2014, bringing the number of active stock exchanges in the United States to 11. Wrote Bloomberg, that left "just one public exchange, Chicago Stock Exchange Inc., that isn't owned Bats, Nasdaq OMX Group or IntercontinentalExchange Group Inc."

== Former exchanges ==
=== Brazil ===
- Bolsa de Valores Bahia Sergipe Alagoas (1917–2000, end of stock trade)
- Bolsa de Valores do Rio de Janeiro (1851–2002)
- Bolsa Livre de São Paulo (1890–1891)
- Bolsa de Valores de São Paulo (1895–2008)
- Bolsa de Valores de Minas Gerais (1914–1974)
- Bolsa de Valores Regional de Ceará, Rio Grande do Norte, Piauí, Maranhão, Pará e Amazonas (1927–2000, end of stock trade)
- Bolsa de Valores do Espírito Santo (?–1974)
- Bolsa de Valores Minas-Espírito Santo (1974–1976)
- Bolsa de Valores de Brasília (?–1976)
- Bolsa de Valores Minas-Espírito Santo-Brasília (1976–2000, end of stock trade)
- BM&FBOVESPA (2008–2017)

=== Canada ===
- Toronto Board of Trade (1845–?)
- Toronto Stock and Mining Exchange (1868–1868)
- Montreal Stock Exchange i.e. Montreal Exchange (1874–2008)
- Halifax Stock Exchange (1874–?)
- British Columbia Mining Stock Board (1877–1880)
- Winnipeg Commodity Exchange (1887–2007)
- Edmonton Board of Trade (1889–?)
- Halifax Board of Trade (1890–?)
- Vancouver Exchange (1894–1985)
- Prince Rupert Stock Exchange (1897–1900)
- Stewart Stock Exchange (1897–1900)
- Toronto Mining Exchange (1898–1901)
- Rossland Exchange (1898–1908)
- Rossland Stock Exchange of British Columbia (1898–1908)
- Montreal Mining Exchange (1899–?)
- Standard Stock Exchange (1899–1901)
- Standard Stock and Mining Exchange (Toronto) (1901–1934)
- Victoria Stock Exchange (1905–1908)
- Vancouver Stock Exchange (1907–1999)
- Winnipeg Stock Exchange (1907–2000)
- Prince Rupert Stockbrokers Association (1909–?)
- Prince Rupert Stock and Mining Exchange (1910–?)
- Dominion Stock Exchange (1910–1911)
- Prince Rupert Stock and Mining Exchange (1910–?)
- Pacific Coast Stock Exchange (Canada) (1910–?)
- Alberta Stock Exchange a/k/a Calgary Stock Exchange (1914–1999)
- Montreal Curb Market (1926–1953)
- Unlisted Stock Market (1929–?)
- Consolidated Mining and Oil Exchange (Toronto) (1929–?)
- Edmonton Stock Exchange (1952–1957)
- Canadian Stock Exchange (1953–1974)
- Vancouver Stock Exchange Curb (1974–?)
- Toronto Futures Exchange (1984–?)
- Canadian Venture Exchange (1999–2001)
- Canadian Dealing Network
- Calgary General Stock Exchange
- Calgary Oil and Stock Exchange
- Calgary Petroleum Stock Exchange
- Standard Mining and Metal Exchange (Toronto)
- Standard Oil Stock Exchange (Calgary)
- Toronto Stock Exchange Curb
- Winnipeg Stock Exchange Curb

=== Mexico ===
- Bolsa Nacional (historical) (1894–1895)
- Guadalajara Stock Exchange (–1975)
- Monterrey Stock Exchange (–1975)

=== United States ===
- Board of Brokers of Philadelphia (1790–2007)
- Boston Stock Exchange (1834 – 2007)
- New Board (1835–1848)
- San Francisco Mining Exchange (1867– 1967)
- Detroit Stock Exchange (1907–1976)
- New York Gold Exchange (1862–1897)
- Carson City Stock Board (NV) (1863 –?)
- Open Board of Stock Brokers (1864–1869)
- Pittsburgh Stock Exchange (1864–1974)
- California Stock and Exchange Board (1872 –?)
- New York Mining Stock Exchange (1875–1926)
- American Mining Board (New York) (1876–?)
- American Mining and Stock Exchange (1876–1877)
- American Mining Stock Exchange (New York) (1880–?)
- Boston Mining and Stock Exchange (1880–?)
- New-York Open Gold and Stock Exchange (?–1877)
- New-York Open Board of Stock Brokers (1877–)
- St. Louis Mining and Stock Exchange (1880–1893)
- Chamber of Commerce of Minneapolis (1881–?)
- Baltimore Stock Exchange (prior to 1881–1949)
- A New Exchange (New York, NY) (1882–?)
- San Francisco Stock and Bond Exchange (1882–1956)
- National Petroleum Exchange (1882–1883)
- Chicago Mining Exchange (April 7, 1882–?)
- New Orleans Stock Exchange (prior to 1880-1959)
- Washington Stock Exchange (prior to 1884–1964)
- Miscellaneous Security Board (–circa 1885)
- New-York Petroleum Exchange and Stock Board (–1885)
- California Gold Mining Exchange of San Francisco (1985–?)
- Cincinnati Stock Exchange (1885–2003)
- Birmingham Stock Exchange (1887–?)
- Ashland Commercial Stock Exchange (WI) (1887–?)
- A New Exchange (Portland, OR) (1887–?)
- Intermountain Stock Exchange (1888–1986)
- Los Angeles Oil Exchange (1899–1956)
- Aspen Mining Stock Association (CO) (1890–?)
- Butte Mining Stock Exchange (MT) (1890–1910?)
- Another Stock Exchange (Boston) (1890–?)
- Atlanta Mining and Stock Exchange (GA) (1891–?)
- Boulder Mining Stock Exchange (CO) (1896–1899)
- Boise Mining Exchange (1896–?)
- American Board of Mining Industries(Chicago) (1896–?)
- Spokane Stock Exchange (1897–1991)
- California Oil Exchange (1899–1900)
- California Oil Exchange (1899–?)
- St. Louis Stock Exchange (1899–1949)
- California Oil and Stock Exchange (1900–?)
- Portland Mining Stock Exchange (1900–?)
- Cleveland Stock Exchange (1900–1949)
- Portland Stock Exchange (1906–07)
- New York Curb Market Agency (1908–2008)
- Seattle Stock Exchange (1927–1942)
- Chicago Curb Exchange (1928–1938)
- Buffalo Stock Exchange (1929–1936)
- Boston Curb Market (closed shortly after formation of SEC in 1934)
- Buffalo Stock Exchange (closed shortly after formation of SEC in 1934)
- Denver Stock Market (closed shortly after formation of SEC in 1934)
- Hartford Stock Market (closed shortly after formation of SEC in 1934)
- Milwaukee Grain and Stock Exchange (closed shortly after formation of SEC in 1934)
- New York Mining Exchange (closed shortly after formation of SEC in 1934)
- New York Real Estate Securities Exchange (closed shortly after formation of SEC in 1934)
- Wheeling Stock Exchange (closed shortly after formation of SEC in 1934)
- New York Produce Exchange (stopped trading in securities in 1934)
- Seattle Curb and Mining Exchange (–1935)
- Minneapolis-St. Paul Stock Exchange (1929–1949)
- Pacific Exchange (1956–2005)
- Arizona Stock Exchange (1990–2001)
- Direct Edge (1998–2014)
- Atriax (2000–2002)
- Albany Market
- Baltimore Market
- Boston Curb Exchange/Boston Market
- Breckinridge Exchange
- California Stock and Oil Exchange
- Charlotte Stock Exchange
- Associated Stock Exchange
- American Mining Exchange
- Philadelphia Stock Exchange (1790-2007)

== See also ==
- Regional stock exchange
- List of stock exchanges
- List of stock exchanges in the Americas
- List of futures exchanges
