= List of stock exchange mergers in the Americas =

This is a list of major stock exchange mergers and acquisitions in the Americas. It also features the name of any resultant stock exchanges from mergers or acquisitions. According to Robert E. Wright of Bloomberg in 2013, historians assert that "rather than exhibiting a trend of constant consolidation, the number of exchanges active across the globe has waxed and waned several times over the past 200 years... During periods of heightened regulation, political turmoil or communication advances, exchanges tend to fail or merge. Economic prosperity, increased financial speculation and high levels of market uncertainty, by contrast, drive new entries."

The National Stock Exchange ceased trading operations on May 30, 2014, bringing the number of active stock exchanges in the United States to 11. Bloomberg wrote that this left "just one public exchange, Chicago Stock Exchange Inc., that isn’t owned by BATS, Nasdaq OMX Group or IntercontinentalExchange Group Inc."

== Major mergers or acquisitions ==
=== Brazil ===
- 1991: Bolsa de Mercadorias de São Paulo (São Paulo Mercantile Exchange) merged with Bolsa Mercantil e de Futuros (Mercantile and Futures Exchange)
  - Merged entity named Bolsa de Mercadorias e Futuros — BM&F (Brazilian Mercantile and Futures Exchange)
- 1991: Bolsa Brasileira de Futuros (Brazilian Futures Exchange) merged with Bolsa de Mercadorias e Futuros
  - Name kept as Bolsa de Mercadorias e Futuros
- 2000: Bolsa de Valores do Rio de Janeiro (Rio de Janeiro Stock Exchange) acquired by Bolsa de Valores de São Paulo — BOVESPA (São Paulo Stock Exchange)
- 2008: Bolsa de Valores de São Paulo merged with Bolsa de Mercadorias e Futuros
  - Merged entity named BM&FBOVESPA
- 2017: Central de Custódia e Liquidação Financeira de Títulos Privados — CETIP (Central for Custody and Financial Settlement of Private Securities) merged with BM&FBOVESPA
  - Merged entity named B3 — Brasil, Bolsa, Balcão (B3 — Brazil Stock Exchange and Over-the-Counter Market)

=== Canada ===
- 1901: Standard Stock Exchange merged with Standard Stock and Mining Exchange
- 1901: Toronto Mining Exchange merged with Standard Stock and Mining Exchange
- 1934: Standard Stock and Mining Exchange (Toronto) merged with Toronto Stock Exchange
- 1953: Montreal Curb Market merged with Canadian Stock Exchange
- 1974: Canadian Stock Exchange merged with Montreal Stock Exchange
  - Merged entity named Montreal Stock Exchange
- November 1999: Aspect of Montreal Stock Exchange co-founds, and is acquired by, Canadian Venture Exchange
  - Name kept as Canadian Venture Exchange
- November 1999: Alberta Stock Exchange co-founds, and is acquired by, Canadian Venture Exchange
  - Name kept as Canadian Venture Exchange
- November 1999: Vancouver Stock Exchange co-founds, and is acquired by, Canadian Venture Exchange
  - Name kept as Canadian Venture Exchange
- 2007: Winnipeg Commodity Exchange merged with International Securities Exchange
- 2008: Boston Options Exchange acquired by Montreal Exchange
  - Name kept as Boston Options Exchange as subsidiary
- 2008: Montreal Stock Exchange merged with Toronto Stock Exchange

=== Mexico ===
- 14 June 1895: Bolsa de México (Stock Exchange of Mexico) merged with Bolsa Nacional (National Stock Exchange)
  - Name changed to Bolsa de México
- 1975: Guadalajara Stock Exchange acquired by Bolsa Mexicana de Valores (Mexican Stock Exchange)
  - Name changed to Bolsa Mexicana de Valores
- 1975: Monterrey Stock Exchange acquired by Bolsa Mexicana de Valores (Mexican Stock Exchange)
  - Name changed to Bolsa Mexicana de Valores

=== United States ===
- 1865: New York Gold Exchange acquired by the New York Stock Exchange
  - Name not changed as subsidiary
- 1869: Open Board of Stock Brokers merged with the New York Stock Exchange
  - Name retained as New York Stock Exchange (then the New York Stock and Exchange Board)
- 1877: New-York Open Gold and Stock Exchange acquired by the American Mining and Stock Exchange
  - Name retained as American Mining and Stock Exchange
- 1877: American Mining and Stock Exchange acquired by the New York Mining Stock Exchange
  - Name changed to New York Mining Stock Exchange
- 1883: National Petroleum Exchange acquired by the New York Mining Stock Exchange
  - Name changed to New-York Mining Stock and National Petroleum Exchange.
- 1885: New-York Petroleum Exchange and Stock Board merged with the New-York Mining and National Petroleum Exchange
  - Name changed to Consolidated Stock and Petroleum Exchange
- September 1900: California Oil Exchange acquired by Los Angeles Stock Exchange
  - Name changed to Los Angeles Stock Exchange
- 1900: California Oil Exchange acquired by Producer's Oil Exchange
- September 1909: Los Angeles Nevada Mining Exchange acquired by Los Angeles Stock Exchange
  - Name changed to Los Angeles Stock Exchange
- 1910: California Stock and Oil Exchange acquired by San Francisco Stock Exchange
- 1 October 1935: Seattle Curb and Mining Exchange acquired by Seattle Stock Exchange
  - Name changed to Seattle Stock Exchange
- 1938: San Francisco Curb Exchange absorbed by the San Francisco Stock Exchange
- 1949: Baltimore Stock Exchange merged with the Philadelphia Stock Exchange
  - Name changed to Philadelphia-Baltimore Stock Exchange
- September 1949: St. Louis Stock Exchange acquired by Chicago Stock Exchange
  - Name changed to Midwest Stock Exchange
- October 1949: Cleveland Stock Exchange acquired by Chicago Stock Exchange
  - Name changed to Midwest Stock Exchange
- 1949: Minneapolis-St. Paul Stock Exchange acquired by Chicago Stock Exchange
  - Name changed to Midwest Stock Exchange
- 1959: New Orleans Stock Exchange acquired by Midwest Stock Exchange
  - Name changed to Midwest Stock Exchange
- 1958: San Francisco Stock and Bond Exchange merged with Los Angeles Oil Exchange
  - Name changed to Pacific Coast Stock Exchange
- 1964: Washington Stock Exchange acquired by the Philadelphia-Baltimore Stock Exchange
  - Name changed to Philadelphia-Baltimore-Washington Stock Exchange
- 1969: Pittsburgh Stock Exchange acquired by the Philadelphia-Baltimore-Washington Stock Exchange
  - Name changed to Philadelphia Stock Exchange
- 1986: Intermountain Stock Exchange acquired by Commodity Exchange, Inc. (COMEX)
  - Intermountain Stock Exchange ceased operating and went dormant
- 1994: Commodity Exchange merged with New York Mercantile Exchange
- 1998: Coffee, Sugar and Cocoa Exchange merged with the New York Board of Trade
- 2005: Pacific Stock Exchange merged with NYSE
  - Name changed to NYSE Arca
- 2006: Archipelago acquired by NYSE Euronext
- 2007: Chicago Board of Trade merged with Chicago Mercantile Exchange
- October 2, 2007: Boston Stock Exchange acquired by Nasdaq
  - Renamed NASDAQ OMX BX
- July 24, 2008: Philadelphia Stock Exchange acquired by Nasdaq
  - Name changed to NASDAQ OMX PHLX
- 2008: Boston Options Exchange acquired by Montreal Exchange
  - Name kept as Boston Options Exchange
- 2008: American Stock Exchange absorbed by NYSE Euronext
  - Name changed to NYSE Alternext U.S.
- 2011: National Stock Exchange acquired by CBOE Stock Exchange
  - Both exchanges kept their separate names.
- 2014: Direct Edge merged with BATS Global Markets
  - Name changed to BATS Global Markets
- February 2017: National Stock Exchange acquired by the New York Stock Exchange
  - National Stock Exchange ceased, with plans to reopen under the NYSE.
- 2017: BATS Global Markets to be acquired by Chicago Board Options Exchange

== See also ==
- List of stock exchanges
- List of stock exchanges in the Americas
- List of former stock exchanges in the Americas
