= InNexus Biotechnology =

InNexus Biotechnology Inc.
- Type: Public
- Traded as: NEX: IXS.H
- Industry: Biotechnology
- Founded: 2001, British Columbia, Canada
- Headquarters: Principal Management formerly in Chandler, Arizona, United States.
- Key people: Jeff Morhet, Former Chairman and CEO; David Petulla, Former CFO; Thomas Kindt, Former Chief Scientific Officer
- Products: DXL625 (CD20) for prospective treatment of Non-Hodgkin’s Lymphoma, preclinical stage, DXL702 (HER2/neu) for prospective treatment of breast cancer, preclinical stage.
- Number of employees: 0 (2012)

InNexus Biotechnology, Inc.. was a drug company based in British Columbia, Canada. InNexus was founded in 2001 and became a publicly traded corporation in 2003 on the TSX Venture Exchange. On 2009-12-30, the company filed a Form 15-F with the U.S. Securities and Exchange Commission (SEC) to voluntarily deregister its common stock under the Securities Exchange Act of 1934 and continue its primary listing on the TSX Venture Exchange under the symbol of IXS; it is no longer listed on the TSX Venture Exchange. IXS was developing what they refer to as DXLA- or DXL-modified antibodies, wherein certain autophilic peptides are integrated with a monoclonal antibody. The DXL-modified antibodies have been shown to have enhanced binding affinity and, as a potential result, greater potency for use as a therapy to fight cancer and higher signal strength for use as a diagnostic for detecting cancer versus an unmodified antibody.
