= California Oil Exchange =

- Type: Regional stock exchange
- Location: San Francisco, California, United States
- Founded: October 18, 1899
- Closed: September 1900
- Currency: USD

The California Oil Exchange was a regional stock exchange in California. It opened in San Francisco on October 18, 1899, with a "large attendance" and 22 listed stocks. The stocks were from the oil districts of Los Angeles, Santa Barbara, and Fresno. Shares sold on the first day included St. Lawrence, San Joaquin, Northfield, Quitable, Big Panoche, Kings County, 100 Eagle, and 200 Stella. It was absorbed by the Los Angeles Stock Exchange in September 1900, when 51 members relinquished their membership in the California Oil Exchange in favor of membership in the other.

== See also ==
- List of former stock exchanges in the Americas
- List of stock exchange mergers in the Americas
- Pacific Exchange
