= Lyrtech =

LYRtech inc.
- Type: Public
- Traded as: NEX: LTK.H
- Industry: Integrated Circuits
- Founded: 1983
- Headquarters: Quebec City, Quebec, Canada
- Key people: Louis Bélanger, CEO
- Products: FPGA and DSP Development, Missile Warning Systems
- Number of employees: ~90
- Website: www.lyrtech.com

LYRtech inc. (NEX: LTK.H) is a digital signal processing development company based in Quebec City, Quebec, Canada. Lyrtech designs and produces electronics systems for audio processing, video processing, networking, voice over IP processing, and Wireless communications. Lyrtech also develops aerospace and military electronics for applications including geolocation, missile warning systems, and laser warning receivers.

In November 2006, Lyrtech released a small form factor software-defined radio development platform in partnership with Texas Instruments and Xilinx. Its Innovator division, acquired in 2006, for nearly $3M, was sold back for roughly $300,000 in late 2007 as part of a restructuring plan designed to save the company.

Lyrtech was ranked 43 in the 2007 Canadian Technology Fast 50 by Deloitte.

In November 2011, the company's assets were taken as repayment by one of the main creditors, Finex Corp. Following this move, Lyrtech was left without assets and operations and has been delisted from TSX-V. Last trades were at 0.005 (1/2 cent) per share, giving the company valuation at about $200,000.
