= Open Board of Stock Brokers =

- Type: Regional stock exchange
- Location: 16 and 18 Broad Street, Manhattan, New York City, United States
- Founded: 1864
- Closed: Merged with the NYSE in 1869
- Currency: United States dollar

The Open Board of Stock Brokers was an early regional stock exchange in the United States. It was established in 1864, "to profit from the economic and investment boom sparked by the Civil War."

The old Open Board of Stock Brokers was located at 16 and 18 Broad Street, now the site of the New York Stock Exchange Building.

With 354 members, the Open Board of Stock Brokers rivaled its early competitor the NYSE in membership (which had 533) "because it used a more modern, continuous trading system superior to the NYSE’s twice-daily call sessions." The Open Board of Stock Brokers merged with the NYSE in 1869.

Later in 1877, a new organization the New-York Open Board of Stock Brokers commissioned the building of the old Open Board of Stock Brokers.

== See also ==
- List of former stock exchanges in the Americas
- List of stock exchange mergers in the Americas
- Economy of New York City
