= Great Panther Mining =

GPL AMEX

Great Panther Mining Limited
- Formerly: Great Panther Silver; Lodestar Mines Ltd.
- Type: Public
- Traded as: OTCID Basic: GPLDF
- Industry: Mining
- Founded: 1965
- Fate: Bankrupted in 2022
- Headquarters: Vancouver, British Columbia, Canada
- Key people: Robert Archer (CEO, 2005-17); James Bannantine (CEO, 2017-19); Jeffrey Mason (Interim CEO 2020); Rob Henderson (CEO, 2020-22); Alan Hair (Interim CEO 2022); Sandra Daycock (2022)

Great Panther Mining Limited (formerly Great Panther Silver) is a Canadian company, headquartered in Vancouver, that formerly owned and operated a gold mine in Brazil. The company became a metal producer and listed on the Toronto Stock Exchange in 2006 after a restructuring in which Robert Archer took over as Chief Executive Officer and acquired and returned several dormant silver-gold mines in Mexico back into production. In 2015 the company merged with TSXV-listed Cangold which was attempting to develop its own gold-silver mine in Mexico. In early 2019, the company acquired ASX-listed Beadell Resources for its Tucano Gold Mine in Brazil.

== History ==
The company that would become Great Panther Mining was founded in 1965 as a private company called Lodestar Mines Ltd, prospecting emeralds in Zimbabwe. It became a public company, as Lodestar Energy Inc, with its initial public offering on June 18, 1980, on the Vancouver Stock Exchange. It underwent several name changes, mergers and acquisitions and pursued several business interests throughout the 1980s and 1990s, including oil and gas development in Oklahoma, agriculture as Controlled Environmental Farming International Ltd, baby bassinets as New Age Ventures and oil again, this time in California and Thailand, as Great Panther Inc.

The company re-organized again in 2003-04 to become Great Panther Resources Limited, with a new CEO, Robert Archer and Francisco Ramos to pursue the development of various mineral rights in Mexico. Among other interests, it acquired the Guanajuato Mine Complex and the Mexican mining company Minera Mexicana el Rosario SA de CV for its dormant Topia Mine. They brought those former mines back into production so that in 2006 they produced 730 tonnes of zinc, 616 tonnes lead, 313,484 oz of silver and 1,394 oz of gold. With this production, in November 2006, the company's stock graduated to the Toronto Stock Exchange from the TSX Venture Exchange. In 2010, when the company changed its name to Great Panther Silver they produced 1,534,957 oz of silver along with over a thousand tonnes of both zinc and lead and, subsequently, in 2011, their stock became cross-listed on the NYSE Amex Equities Exchange. While the Topia and Guanajuato mines would remain their only operating mines until 2019, they pursued other mineral interests, such as the El Horcon silver-gold project in Jalisco, Mexico and the Coricancha gold-silver project in Peru. In 2015, Great Panther Silver purchased TSXV-listed Cangold for its the Guadalupe de los Reyes gold-silver project in Sinaloa, Mexico, in an all-share deal worth $1.7 million. The company has been challenged with several deaths at its mine sites. In 2014 a trespasser was killed by guards, in 2016 a worker was killed while operating an underground loader, both at the Guanajuato complex, and in 2019 two more workers were killed in work place accidents.

The company added a third mine to their operations with the 2019 acquisition of Australian Securities Exchange-listed Beadell Resources Limited for their Tucano gold mine in Brazil. The all-stock deal, valued at $105 million, gave Beadell shareholders 38% of the combined company. With mining of gold and other metals making up more of their operations, the company changed its name from Great Panther Silver to Great Panther Mining. Great Panther announced its inaugural Mineral Resource & Mineral Reserve shortly after the acquisition of the Tucano gold mine, in which a massive 51% reduction of mineral resources was reported. Following these developments, in 2020, the Company hired a new CEO, Rob Henderson, and replaced much of its board of directors. In late-2021, the Tucano Mine was fined US$9 million by the Brazilian Environmental Agency for an alleged cyanide pollution incident. In 2022 Great Panther sold its Mexican assets to the TSX-V-listed Guanajuato Silver Company Ltd for US$8,000,000 plus shares in the company, and its Peruvian assets to the TSX-V-listed Newrange Gold for US$750,000. The company filed for creditor protection in September 2022 and was delisted from the Toronto Stock Exchange. In October 2022 the company filed an assignment in bankruptcy, and in 2023 its Brazilian subsidiaries that held the Tucano mine were sold to Tucano Gold.

== Operations ==
In addition to exploration properties in Mexico and Canada, and its ownership of the Coricancha Mine Complex (on care and maintenance since 2013) in Peru, Great Panther owned and operated three operating mines:

- The Tucano Mine in Amapá, Brazil, is an open pit mine producing gold doré bars. It was acquired by Great Panther with its 2019 merger with Beadell Resources Limited. The Tucano Mine tenement portfolio comprised 197,283 ha and was 100% controlled by Great Panther. This large land package in one of the most interesting areas in the world for gold exploration covers approximately a 90 kilometres long section of the Vila Nova Greenstone Belt, centered around the Tucano Mining License.
- The Topia Mine in Durango, Mexico, in an underground mine that produces metallic concentrates containing silver, gold, lead and zinc. It was acquired in 2005 as a facility on care and maintenance and recommissioned by Great Panther and sold it in 2022 to Guanajuato Silver Company Ltd.
- The Guanajuato Mine complex near the city of Guanajuato, Mexico, includes the Guanajuato and the San Ignacio mines and the centralized Cata processing plant. While it has been subject to mining activities since the 1930s, it was acquired by Great Panther in 2005 and further developed as an underground mine to produce silver and gold concentrate material. It was sold in 2022 to Guanajuato Silver Company Ltd.
