= New-York Open Board of Stock Brokers =

American regional stock exchange

- Type: Regional stock exchange
- Location: 16 and 18 Broad Street, Manhattan, New York City, United States
- Currency: United States dollar

The New-York Open Board of Stock Brokers was a stock exchange in New York City. Shortly after being formed, the New-York Open Board of Stock Brokers held their first annual election on February 21, 1877. 87 votes were cast at the Delmonico's Building on New Street. B. M. Nevers was elected president. E. T. Bragaw, former vice president of the New-York Gold Exchange was elected chairman. The building of the old Open Board of Stock Brokers was commissioned as the new permanent location of the exchange, with an initial membership of 272 and memberships pending.

== See also ==
- List of former stock exchanges in the Americas
- List of stock exchange mergers in the Americas
- Economy of New York City
