= Greenbriar Capital Corp =

American renewable energy company

- Company type: Public
- Traded as: TSX-V: GRB
- Founded: April 2, 2009
- Headquarters: Boise, Idaho
- Key people: Jeffrey J. Ciachurski (CEO)
- Website: www.greenbriarcapitalcorp.ca

Greenbriar Capital Corp is a developer of real estate, real estate blockchain, artificial intelligence, and renewable energy. Greenbriar targets deep value assets directed at shareholder value. Greenbriar is a public company and trades on the Toronto Venture Exchange under the symbol GRB.

== History ==
Greenbriar Capital Corp is a US-based company founded by Jeff Ciachurski in 2009, a Canadian citizen who develops renewable energy projects and real estate properties around the world. The company has developed an 80-megawatt wind energy project in Utah, a 100 Megawatt solar project in Puerto Rico and a 1,072 unit housing project in California. The company headquarters is in Boise, Idaho.

Jeff Ciachurski is the CEO of Greenbriar Capital Corp., and previously the founder of Western Wind Energy Corp. Ciachurski created Western Wind Energy in 2002 with $250,000 in start-up capital and subsequently sold the company in 2013 to a subsidiary of Brookfield Asset Management for $420 Million in cash.
