= Tiger International Resources =

- Company type: Gold mining
- Traded as: TSX-V: TGR
- Industry: Mining
- Headquarters: Philippines, Laguna Hills, CA
- Website: www.tigerresources.com
- Footnotes / references 9.3 million Outstanding Shares

Tiger International Resources is a junior mining and exploration company based in British Columbia, Canada. The company has a license to exploit the Itogon Project near Baguio in northern Luzon, Philippines. The mine was operational before World War II, and Tiger intends to bring it back into production. There may also be copper deposits.
