= AZX =

AZX may refer to:

- AZX (airline), ICAO code for the defunct British AB Airlines (1993–1999)
- AZX-Monstrum, an unofficial clone of the ZX Spectrum home computer
- AZX, ICAO code for former Gabonese airline Air Max Africa (2002–2006)
- AZX, NYSE symbol for Azurix, a Texas water-services company
- AZX or Arizona Stock Exchange, an early e-trading exchange (1990–2001)
- AZX, ID code for a version of the 2.3 VR5 110-125kW Volkswagen engine
