= Boston Options Exchange =

American automated exchange

BOX Options Exchange LLC
- Type: Stock exchange, futures exchange, market data
- Location: Boston, Massachusetts, United States
- Founded: 2002
- Key people: Ed Boyle (CEO, BOX Exchange) Tony McCormick (CEO, BOX Regulation)
- Website: www.boxoptions.com

BOX Options Exchange, LLC (BOX) is an automated exchange operated by the TMX Group and owned by TMX and a consortium of broker-dealers. As an equity options market, it provides electronic order matching services to stockbrokers and traders.

== Overview ==
BOX Holdings Group LLC is the parent holding company of the BOX Options Market LLC (BOX Options), and BOX Digital Markets LLC. BOX Options was established in 2002 and launched trading in February 2004 as an alternative to the then-existing market models. BOX Options currently operates both electronic and open outcry venues for the trading of equity options.

BOX Digital was founded in 2018 and is engaged in creating and developing markets for trading digital assets in a regulated environment. BOX Exchange LLC is a national securities exchange registered with the SEC under Section 6 of the Securities Exchange Act of 1934. BOX Options is an equity options market that is jointly owned by the TMX Group and a group of broker/dealers. BOX was established in 2002 and launched trading in February 2004 as an alternative to the then-existing market models.

== Services ==
The exchange offers options derivatives on approximately 1,500 different securities. It generates fully tradeable orders and provides multiple competing market makers. BOX trades on SOLA, a trading platform created by the Montréal Exchange that BOX adopted in 2006; the exchange cited an average response time of less than 20 milliseconds.

== PIP Algorithm ==
BOX offers price improvement to traders through its patent-pending Price Improvement Period automated trading mechanism. PIP allows clients with broker guarantees on the first penny of price improvement a small period to improve upon available prices. In June 2007, BOX was named U.S. options exchange of the year by Futures and Options World Magazine. CEO R. Scott Morris attributed BOX's success to the PIP algorithm, noting the "$110 million in savings to investors because of our price improvement model.”

== See also ==
- List of stock exchanges
- List of stock exchanges in the Americas
- List of stock exchange mergers in the Americas
