= Vancouver Stock Exchange =

Canadian stock exchange (1906–1999)

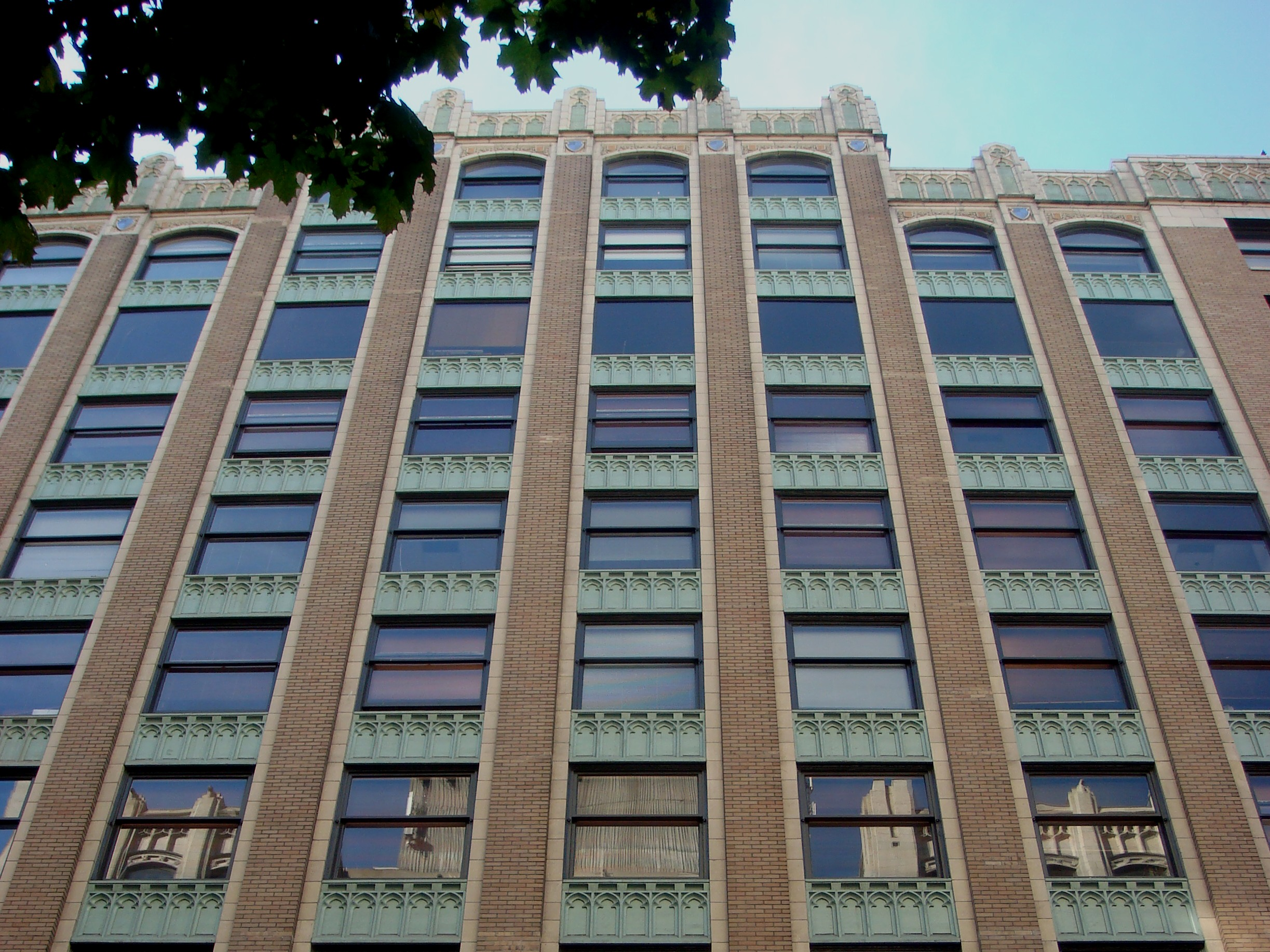
- Type: Regional stock exchange
- Location: Vancouver, British Columbia, Canada
- Founded: 1906
- Closed: November 29, 1999

The Vancouver Stock Exchange (VSE) was a stock exchange based in Vancouver, British Columbia. It was incorporated 1906. On November 29, 1999, the VSE was merged into the Canadian Venture Exchange (CDNX).

== History ==
It was incorporated 1906 and was the third major stock exchange in Canada, after the Toronto Stock Exchange (TSX) and Montreal Stock Exchange (MSE), and featured many small-capitalization, mining, oil and gas-exploration stocks.

In 1989, Forbes magazine labelled the VSE the "scam capital of the world." The VSE tended to attract colourful characters involved in questionable schemes. The best known 'character' on VSE was Murray "the Pez" Pezim. The British journalist Bob Mackin wrote about Pezim: ""The Pez" was the quintessential Howe Street wheeler-dealer known for smoking cigars, promoting his latest get-rich-quick scheme and womanizing. He flogged Vita Pez pep pills and audio tape greeting cards through Pezzaz Productions, a subsidiary of Pezamerica. He scored big with the 1981 Hemlo Valley and 1989 Eskay Creek gold discoveries."

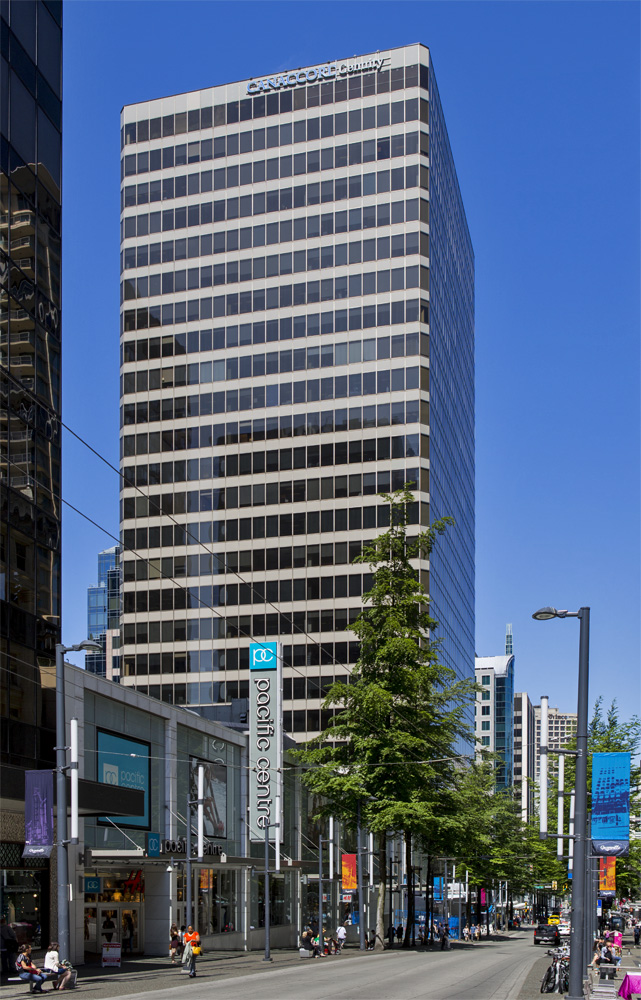
The Stock Exchange Tower was the VSE's home from 1981 to 1999.

In 1973, the Royal Canadian Mounted Police estimated that between 20%-30% of the stocks of the companies listed in the VSE were involved in some sort of fraud. In 1979, a study revealed that investors in companies listed on the VSE lost some of their investments due to fraud 84% of the time, and all of their investments due to fraud 40% of the time, giving the VSE the dubious reputation as the stock exchange with the highest rate of fraud in the world. In 1991, it listed some 2,300 stocks. Some local figures stated that the majority of these stocks were either total failures or frauds. A 1994 report by James Matkin (Vancouver Stock Exchange & Securities Regulation Commission) made reference to "shams, swindles and market manipulations" within the VSE. Regardless, it had roughly C$4 billion in annual trading in 1991. The Hells Angels were extensively involved in many of the stock market frauds on the VSE in the 1980s-1990s. Sasha Angus, the anti-fraud officer of the B.C. Securities Commission in charge of regulating the Vancouver Stock Exchange complained that many wealthy businessmen are quite willing to do business with the Angels and that "We understand the biker gangs are behind a lot of stuff [fraud] we've seen. But they don't always leave their calling card".

The dubious reputation of the VSE made investors unwilling to put their money into stocks in the "scam capital of the world", and led to the VSE to go into a major decline by the 1990s as investors much preferred the better regulated Toronto Stock Exchange. The journalist Clyde Woolman wrote: "The often swashbuckling, sometimes outrageous style of the likes of Nelson Skalbania and Murray Pezim sucked up newspaper print and did nothing to alter the exchange's image". On November 29, 1999, the VSE and the Alberta Stock Exchange (ASE) merged to become the Canadian Venture Exchange (CDNX) (now known as the TSX Venture Exchange), at which time the CDNX acquired the minor-cap stocks from the Bourse de Montréal (MSE). The trading floor of the old VSE remained as the trading floor of the new CDNX.

=== Rounding errors on its Index price ===
The history of the exchange's index provides an example of large errors arising from the accumulation of seemingly minor round-off errors. In January 1982 the index was initialized at 1000 and iteratively updated with each subsequent trade. After each update, the index was truncated to three decimal places. The truncated value was used to calculate the next value of the index. Updates occurred approximately 3000 times each day. The accumulated truncations led to an erroneous loss of around 25 points per month. Over the weekend of November 25–28, 1983, the error was corrected, raising the value of the index from its Friday closing figure of 524.811 to 1098.892.

== Locations ==
1. 849 West Pender Street, (1907–1910)
2. Daily Province Building, 142 West Hastings Street, (1910–1915)
3. Pacific Building, 744 West Hastings Street, (1915–1918)
4. 326 Homer Street, (1918–1924)
5. 532 Granville Street, (1924–1929)
6. Exchange Building, 475 Howe Street, (1929–1946)
7. Branson Brown Building, 540 Howe Street, (1946–1964)
8. Canada Trust Building, 536 Howe Street (1964–1981)
9. Stock Exchange Tower, 609 Granville Street, (1981–1999)

== Leadership ==
=== President (to 1959) and Chairman (from 1960) ===
From its inception, the VSE elected annually a Managing Committee led by a President. At the 1960 annual meeting, the exchange's bylaws and constitution were revised, and the governing body was changed to a Board of Governors led by a Chairman. Initially, the annual meeting was held in July. In 1926 it was held in May, and from 1927 onwards in January. In 1976 it moved to June.

- 1907 – Charles D. Rand
- 1908 – James Rawlinson Waghorn
- 1909, 1910 – Henry James Thorne
- 1911 – John S. Rankin
- 1912 – Gwyn Ivor Gwynn
- 1913 – Robert Baldwin Ellis
- 1914 – John D. Mather
- 1915 – Alfred Newton Wolverton
- 1916 – Albert Ernest Austin
- 1917 – Donald Marshall McGregor
- 1918 – Henry James Thorne
- 1919 – Gwynne Ivor Gwynn
- 1920 – Charles Mason Oliver
- 1921 – Charles Graham Pennock
- 1922 – James T. MacGregor
- 1923 – Alfred Newton Wolverton
- 1924 – Robert Gelletly
- 1925 – William Henry Francis Nanson
- 1926 – Theodore Powell Crowther
- 1927, 1928, 1929 – Sidney Wilfred Miller
- 1930, 1931, 1932 – Charles Graham Pennock
- 1933, 1934, 1935 – Arthur Ewart Jukes
- 1936 – William Hedley Marshall Smith
- 1937 – Frank Elmer Hall
- 1938 – John McGraw
- 1939, 1940, 1941 – Arthur Ewart Jukes
- 1942, 1943, 1944 – Alfred Newton Wolverton
- 1945, 1946 – Kenneth Lawrence Patton
- 1947 – Sir Stephen Lennard
- 1948 – Maitland Dewar McCarthy
- 1949, 1950 – Philip Alfred Wootten
- 1951, 1952 – John Howard Montgomery Lamprey
- 1953 – Frank Elmer Hall
- 1954, 1955 – John McGraw
- 1956 – Norman James Alexander
- 1957 – William Edward Thomson
- 1958 – Hubert Richard Whittall
- 1959 – Thomas Elliott Pilkington

At the 1960 annual meeting, title changes to Chairman of the Board of Governors

- 1960 – Harold William Lefever
- 1961, 1962, 1963 – William Spence
- 1964, 1965 – Bruce Clinton Samis
- 1966 – Alan George Thompson
- 1967 – Donald Coddington McDermid
- 1968, 1969, 1970 – George Maurice Tapp
- 1971 – Gerald Hugh Stevenson
- 1972 – George Renwick Wright
- 1973 – Michael McGuire Ryan
- 1974 – Ernest Charles Drake
- 1975 – George Duval Sherwood
- 1976 – Ronald James Webster
- 1977 – Richard Martin Thompson
- 1978 – Brian Desmond Graves
- 1979 – Ian Archibald Falconer
- 1980 – Robert George Atkinson
- 1981 – Robert Page Chilcott
- 1982 – Peter MacLachlan Brown
- 1983, 1984 – John Anthony Hepburn
- 1985, 1986 – Gerald Fabro
- 1987, 1988 – John Legget Mathers
- 1989, 1990 – Martin James Reynolds
- 1991, 1992 – Brian Dennis Harwood
- 1993, 1994, 1995 – Stuart Ross Sherwood
- 1996, 1997, 1998 – Doris Bradstreet Daughney
- 1999 – Roslyn Kunin

=== Secretary-manager (to 1965) and president (from 1965) ===
The president and chief executive officer was a full-time, paid position that evolved out of the office of secretary. In 1923, the office of secretary was separated from the managing committee, and the secretary became the general manager of the exchange. In 1960, the year the president of the managing committee was changed to the chairman of the board of governors, secretary Van Luven's title was changed to executive vice-president. In February 1965, his title was changed to president and chief executive.

1. Guy Sutton Rothwell, 1923 – October 1926
2. Leonard Hughes-Jones, October 1926 – 1927?
3. Hugh Graham Davidson, May 1927 – March 1928
4. Albert Ernest Sprange, March 1928 – December 1941
5. Victor Alexander Simons, December 1941 – June 1956
6. John Alvin Van Luven, June 1956 – 4 October 1971
7. Thomas Anthony Dohm, 1 February 1972 – 8 November 1972
8. Cyril White, 1 February 1973 – 30 August 1976
9. Robert Alexander Scott, 31 August 1976 – 31 December 1981
10. Donald James Hudson, January 1982 – 30 September 1995
11. Michael Edward Johnson, October 1995 – 29 November 1999

== See also ==
- List of former stock exchanges in the Americas
- List of stock exchange mergers in the Americas
- List of stock exchanges
- Toronto Stock Exchange

== Books ==
- Sher, Julian; Marsden, William (2003). The Road to Hell How Biker Gangs Are Conquering Canada. Toronto: Alfred Knopf.
- Woolman, Clyde (2023). Growing Up Canadian Canada and Its Youth Come of Age 1960-1980. Altona: FriesenPress. ISBN 9781039179493.
