= Alberta Stock Exchange =

Canadian stock exchange (1913–1999)

- Formerly: Calgary Stock Exchange (1913–1974)
- Industry: Stock exchange
- Founded: 25 October 1913
- Defunct: 29 November 1999
- Fate: Merged with the Vancouver Stock Exchange
- Successor: Canadian Venture Exchange
- Headquarters: 333 11 Avenue SW, Calgary, Alberta

The Alberta Stock Exchange (ASE) was a stock exchange based in Calgary, Alberta, established in 1913. It featured mostly mining, resource exploration, and oil sands stocks. The ASE was the original listing exchange for Bre-X, one of the biggest corporate frauds in Canadian history.

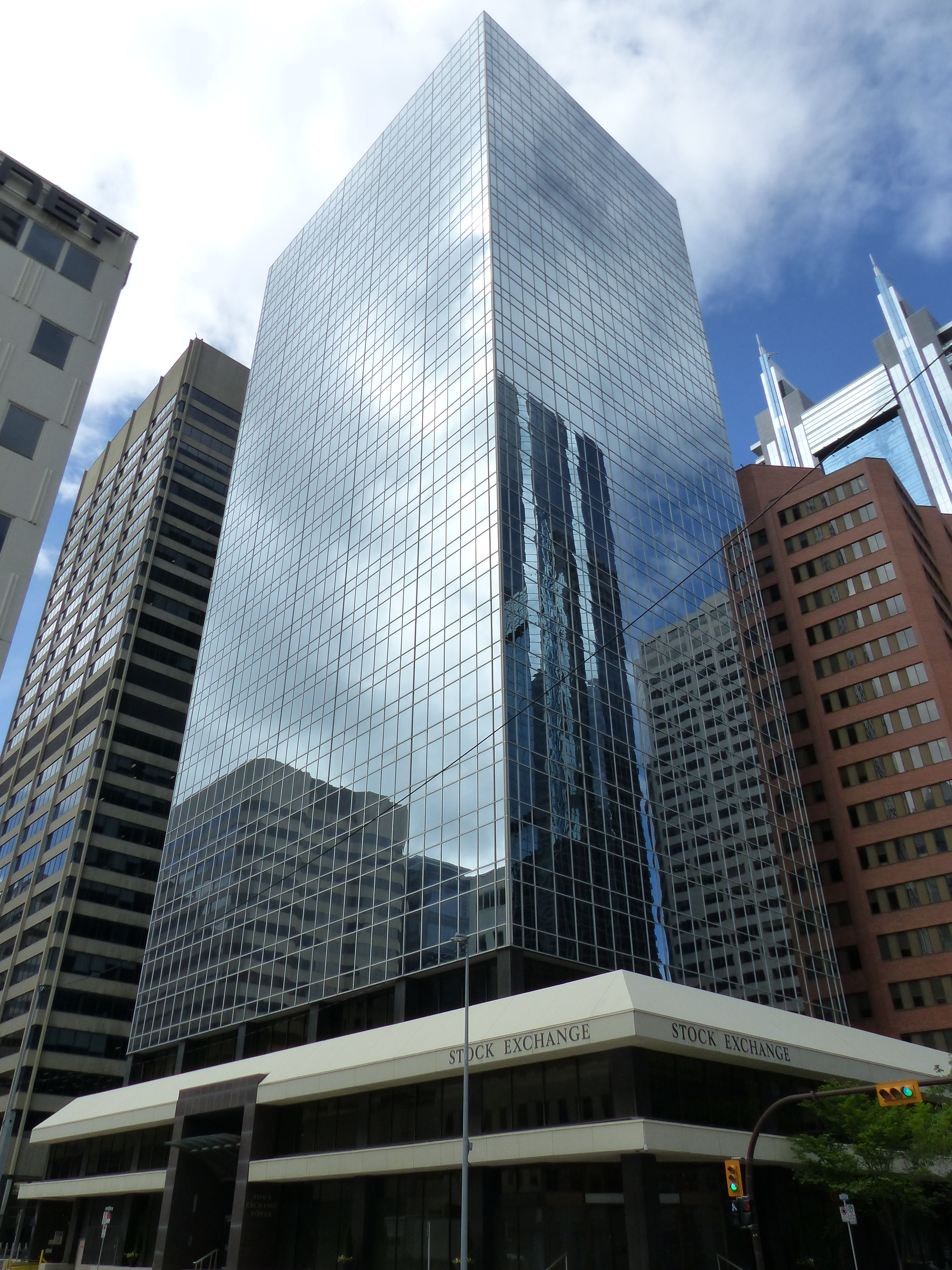
In June 1980 the exchange moved into the new Family Life Building, and in 1986 the building was renamed the Alberta Stock Exchange Tower. It was designed by the Dale Chandler Kennedy Partnership.

On November 29, 1999, the ASE was merged into the Canadian Venture Exchange (CDNX), along with the Vancouver Stock Exchange (VSE) and later the Winnipeg Stock Exchange and the minor-cap stocks from the Bourse de Montréal (MSE). The corporate headquarters of the new CDNX remained in Calgary.

== Leadership ==
=== Chairman of the Board of Governors ===
From its inception, the Exchange was governed by a Committee of Management led by a President. In 1973, the Committee became a Board of Governors, which was led by a Chairman.

- 1914 – Edmund Taylor
- 1915 – Archibald Wayne Dingman
- 1916 – ?

Exchange closed from 1917 to 1926

- 1926–27 – Edmund Taylor
- 1928–29 – Alfred Clark Galbraith
- 1930–34 – John Lee Johnston †
- 1934 – Frederick Austin Elves
- 1935 – Leonard Phillips
- 1936 – Harry Andrew Benjamin
- 1937 – Francis Fournier Reeve
- 1938–39 – Leonard Phillips
- 1940 – Henry Andrew Benjamin
- 1941–49 – Leonard Phillips
- 1950 – Stewart Beaumont Phipps
- 1951 – George Moller Wittichen
- 1952 – Norman Alfred Jacques
- 1953 – Laurence B. Gibson
- 1954 – Archibald Malcolm McNabb
- 1955 – Brian Kelly Locke
- 1956 – Harold Morris Kerr
- 1957 – Frederick Gordon Elves
- 1958–59 –Thomas Watson Meredith
- 1960–61 – Frederick Gordon Elves
- 1962 – Harry Edelson
- 1964–65 – Frederick Gordon Elves
- 1966 – Harold Andrew Walcot
- 1967–68 – Carman Warren Byler
- 1969–70 – William Richard Fulton
- 1971 – James Haddow Scott
- 1972 – Ormiston William Moir

At the 1973 annual meeting, title changes to Chairman of the Board of Governors

- 1973–75 – William Richard Fulton
- 1976 – J. Bruce Kennedy
- 1977–79 – Robert George Peters
- 1980 – R. Scott McCreath
- 1980–83 – John Gordon Rogers
- 1984 – Ralph Eldon Ewing
- 1985–86 – J. Bruce Kennedy
- 1987–88 – William Welton
- 1989–91 – Ian Donald Beddis
- 1992–93 – Herbert John Stoll
- 1994–95 – Michael George Prew
- 1996–97 – John W. Cranston
- 1998–99 – James G. Sorenson

=== President ===
In 1973, the office of Executive Manager was changed to the office of the President. Concurrently, the former office of the President became the Chairman of the Board of Governors.

- J. R. "Jock" Thomson, 1973–1976
- Robert James Milliken, 1976–1988
- Thomas Alexander Cumming, 1988–1999

== See also ==
- List of former stock exchanges in the Americas
- List of stock exchange mergers in the Americas
- List of stock exchanges
