= Los Angeles Stock Exchange =

Defunct regional stock exchange

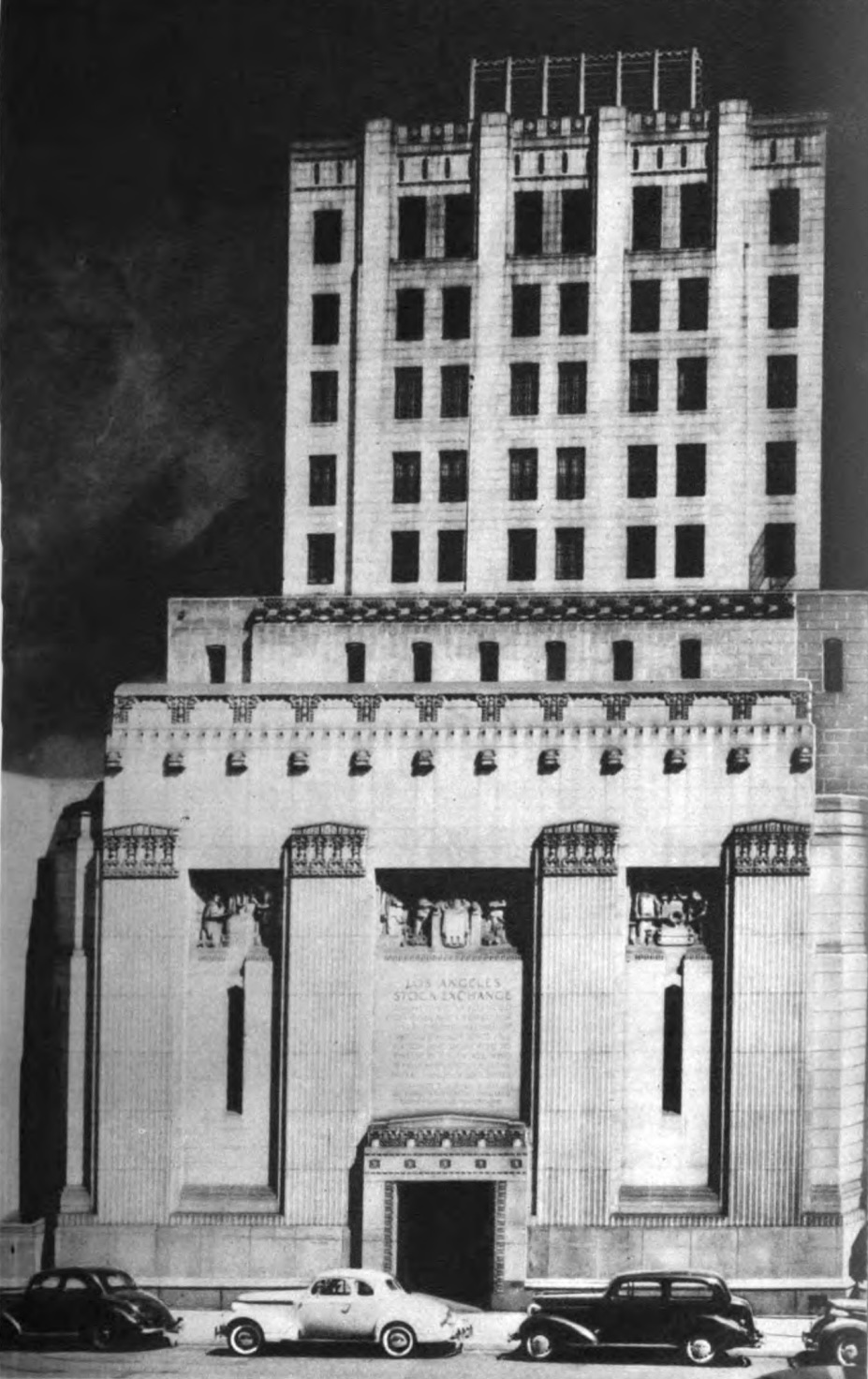
- The Los Angeles Stock Exchange Building in 1941
- Type: Regional stock exchange
- Location: Los Angeles, United States
- Founded: 1899
- Closed: 1956
- Currency: USD

The Los Angeles Oil Exchange was a regional stock exchange in Los Angeles, California. Founded in 1899, in 1900 the name was changed to the Los Angeles Stock Exchange. In 1956, it merged into the Pacific Coast Stock Exchange.

== History ==
The Los Angeles Oil Exchange was organized in 1899 by a group of oil company owners, including Wallace Hardison. The Exchange's first trading session was on February 1, 1900. In December 1900 the name was changed to the Los Angeles Stock Exchange. The Exchange absorbed the California Oil Exchange in September 1900 and the Los Angeles Nevada Mining Exchange in September 1909.

During the early development of the Los Angeles City Oil Field, no single firm had a dominant share. Drillers started their own companies, flooding the local stock exchange with shares of start-up oil firms. There were so many of these that the Los Angeles Stock Exchange had to open a separate facility just to deal with oil stocks.

The Exchange changed locations frequently in its early years; it was housed in the Yosemite Building at 115 S. Broadway from 1899 to 1902, the Hellman Building at 233 W. Second Street from 1902 to 1903, 123 S. Broadway in 1903, the Chamber of Commerce Building at 124 S. Broadway from 1904 to 1907, the Isaias W. Hellman Building at 4th and Main Street from 1907 to 1921, and Barclay's Bank Building beginning in 1921. The exchange finally located to 618 South Spring Street in downtown Los Angeles in 1931 in the Los Angeles Stock Exchange Building, where it remained until February 1986. Needing more space, the trading floor was moved to the Pacific Stock Exchange building at 233 South Beaudry Avenue, where it stayed until it closed in May 2001.

In 1956, the San Francisco Stock and Bond Exchange and the Los Angeles Oil Exchange merged to create the Pacific Coast Stock Exchange, with trading floors in both cities.

== See also ==
- List of former stock exchanges in the Americas
- List of stock exchange mergers in the Americas
- Stock exchanges in the United States
