= TMX Group =

Canadian financial services company

TMX Group Limited

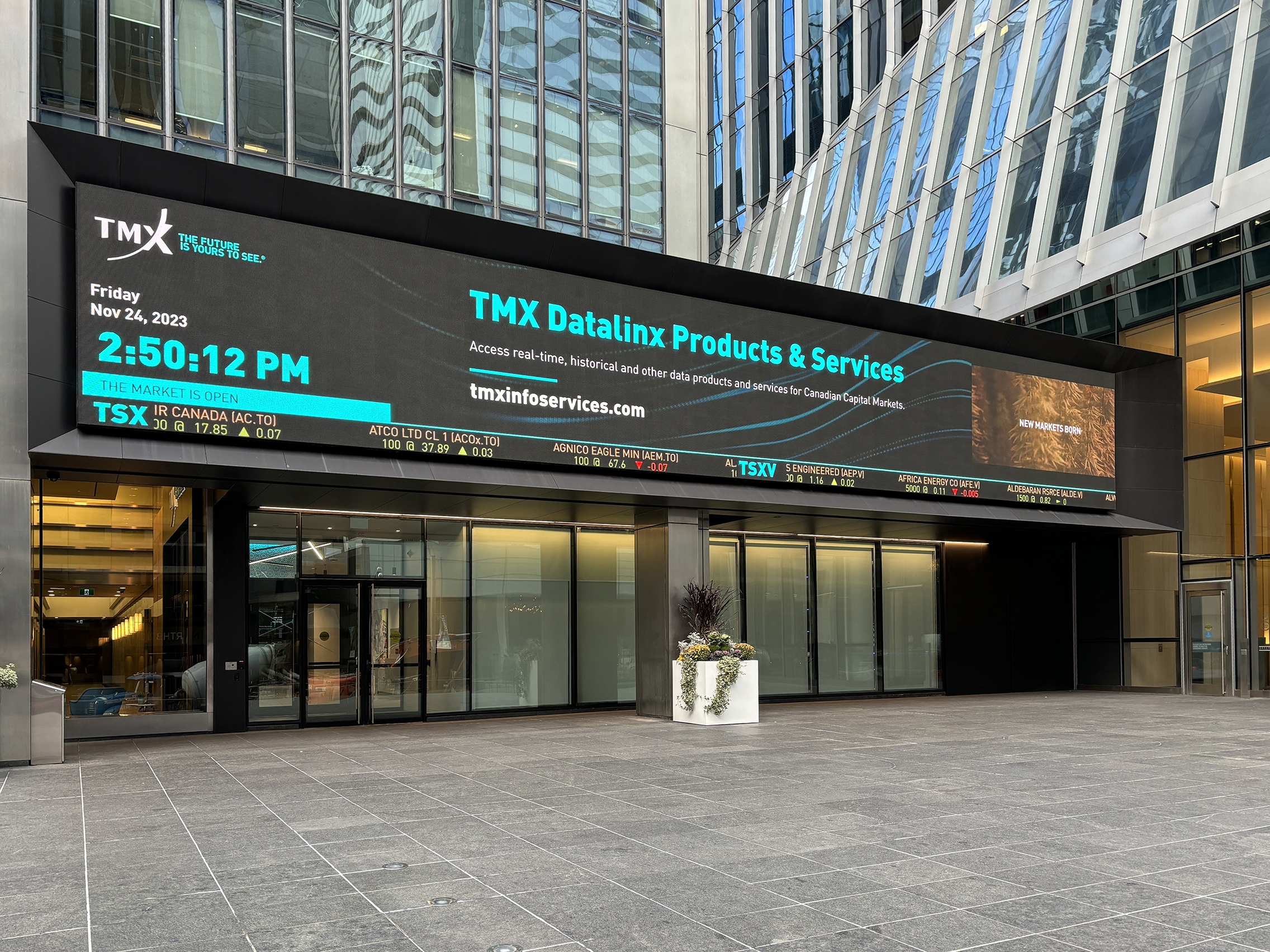
- TMX Market Centre in 2023
- Type: Public
- Traded as: TSX: X
- Industry: Financial services
- Founded: 1 May 2008; 18 years ago
- Headquarters: Toronto, Ontario, Canada
- Key people: Luc Bertrand, Chairman; John McKenzie, CEO
- Products: Stock exchange, futures exchange, market data
- Revenue: $1.1 billion (2022)
- Operating income: $524.5 million (2022)
- Net income: $542.7 million (2022)
- Total assets: $55,983.1 million (2022)
- Total equity: $4,207.4 million (2022)
- Number of employees: 1,693 (2022)
- Divisions: Toronto Stock Exchange; TSX Venture Exchange; Montreal Exchange; Boston Options Exchange; Trayport
- Website: tmx.com

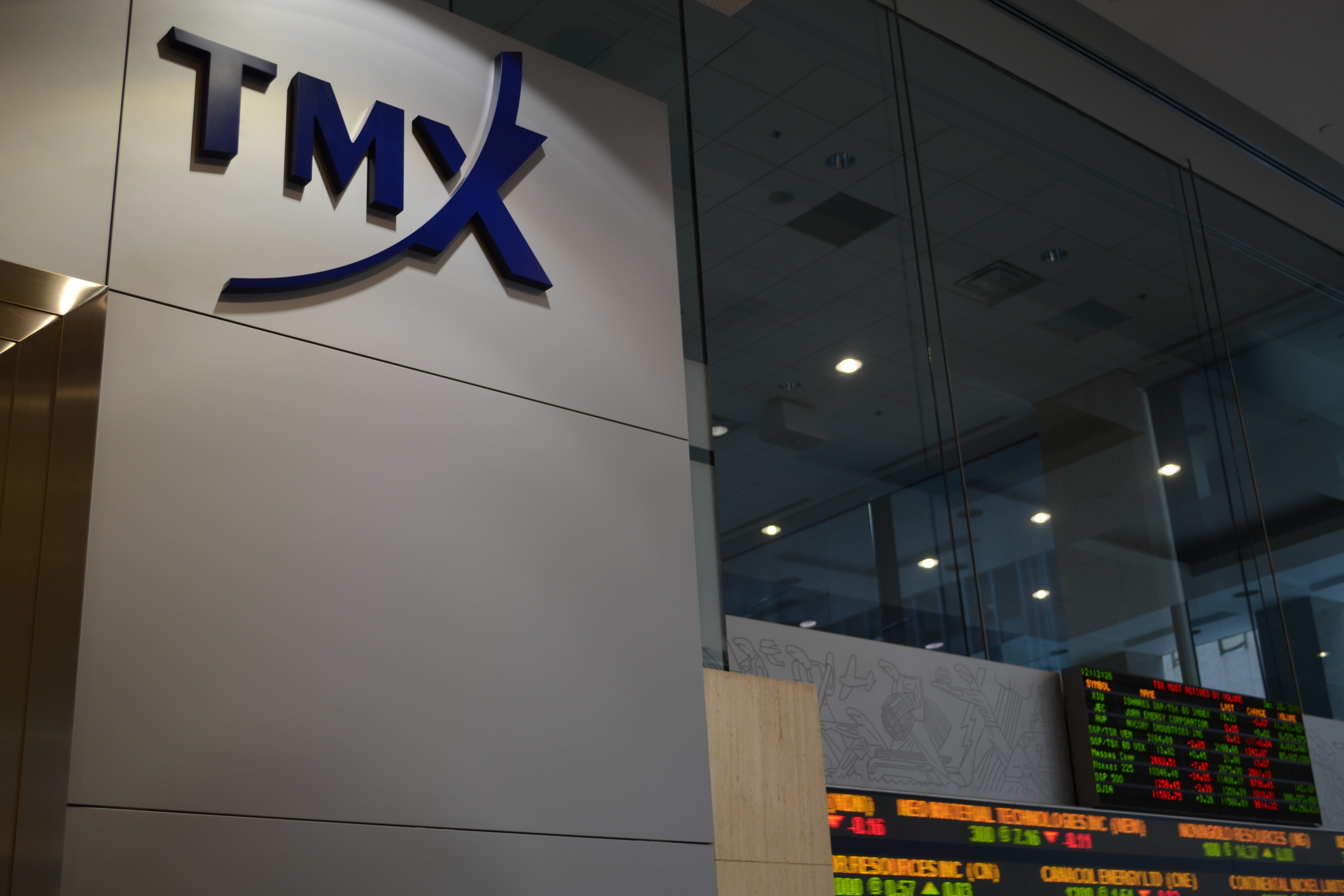
TMX Group offices at 130 King Street West in Toronto, Ontario, Canada.

TMX Group Limited is a Canadian financial services company that operates equities, fixed income, derivatives, and energy markets exchanges. The company provides services encompassing listings, trading, clearing, settling and depository facilities, information services as well as technology services for the international financial community.

TMX Group is best known for its stock exchanges, Toronto Stock Exchange (TSX), which serves the senior equity markets, and TSX Venture Exchange (TSXV), which serves the public venture equity market. TSXV was formerly known as the Canadian Venture Exchange (CDNX), but it also owns and operates other exchanges in Canada, including Montréal Exchange and TSX Alpha Exchange, as well as the country's depository, clearing and settlement business, CDS. TMX Group also owns and operates TMX Equity Transfer Services, Shorcan Brokers Limited, the Canadian Derivatives Clearing Corporation (CDCC), as well as stakes in both CanDeal.ca Inc. and BOX Options Exchange. Other notable subsidiaries of TMX Group include Trayport Limited, the developer of the Joule electronic trading platform for energy markets, and TMX Datalinx, which provides data products and services.

TMX Group is headquartered in Toronto and operates offices across Canada (Montreal, Calgary and Vancouver), in key U.S. markets (New York City, Houston, Boston and Chicago), and overseas (London, Beijing, Singapore and Sydney).

== History ==
In 2001, the Toronto Stock Exchange acquired the Canadian Venture Exchange (formed by the merger of the Vancouver Stock Exchange and Alberta Stock Exchange on November 29, 1999), which was renamed the TSX Venture Exchange on July 31, 2001. The acquisition was carried out through a parent company, TSX Group Inc.

The Montreal Exchange was acquired on December 10, 2007, for C$1.31 Billion. The acquisition was completed on May 1, 2008, and the corporation subsequently renamed to TMX Group Inc.

On June 11, 2008, at a meeting of shareholders of TSX Group Inc, a resolution to change the name of the corporation to TMX Group Inc. was put forward. The formal vote for the deal took place in September.

On February 9, 2011, the London Stock Exchange Group announced that they had agreed to merge with the TMX, creating a combined entity with a market capitalization of $5.9 billion (£3.7 billion). Xavier Rolet, CEO of the LSE Group, will head the company, while TMX Chief Executive Thomas Kloet will become president. Based on data from November 30, 2010, the new stock exchange would be the second largest in the world with a market cap 47% greater than the Nasdaq. Announced on June 1, 2011, the provisional name for the combined group would be LTMX Group plc.

On June 13, 2011, a rival bid from the Maple Group of Canadian interests, was unveiled: a cash and stock bid of $3.7 billion CAD, in hopes of blocking the LSE Group's takeover of TMX. The group is composed of the leading banks and financial institutions of Canada. Luc Bertrand, spokesman for Maple Group and one of the drivers of the bid, is vice chairman of the National Bank of Canada and also TMX Group's largest individual shareholder.

On June 22, 2011, the LSE Group and TMX agreed to pay a special dividend to shareholders. The special dividend is meant to sway voters away from Maple Group's rival bid. The dividend was valued at $678 million, with TMX shareholders receiving $4 per share and LSE shareholders receiving $1.36 per share. Including the special dividend, the LSE agreement would be valued at $48.90 per share versus the $48 per share of Maple. The exchanges also pledged to maintain the dividend at least as high as the current TMX annual payout, which is C$1.60 a share.

On June 29, LSEG and TMX terminated the merger plans after it appeared that the merger would not be approved by the needed two-thirds majority of TMX shareholders.

On July 11, 2012, Maple Group's deal was approved by all federal and provincial regulatory authorities, including the Ontario Securities Commission and the Autorité des marchés financiers.

On July 31, 2012, Maple Group announced that it won control of the TMX Group, as 91% of shares were tendered for its takeover offer. The formal vote for the deal will take place in September.

On January 21, 2013, TMX Group announced that combined, Toronto Stock Exchange and TSX Venture Exchange were first in the world among global exchanges by number of new listings for the fourth consecutive year, according to data from the World Federation of Exchanges (WFE) as of December 31, 2012.

On February 13, 2013, TMX Group announced it had entered into an agreement with Equity Financial Holdings Inc. (Equity) by which TMX would acquire Equity's transfer agent and corporate trust services business.

On July 25, 2013, the S&P Dow Jones Indices and TMX Group announced the launch of the S&P/TSX High Income Energy Index. The new index was licensed by S&P Dow Jones Indices to Guggenheim Investments for an Exchange Traded Fund listed on the New York Stock Exchange.

On February 12, 2014, TSX Venture Exchange announced the 2014 TSX Venture 50, an annual ranking of strong performing companies from five sectors: Clean Technology, Diversified Industries, Mining, Oil & Gas, and Technology & Life Sciences.

On March 25, 2014, TMX Group announced plans to launch a business to facilitate capital raising and the trading of securities in the exempt market. TSX Private Markets enables TMX Group to serve companies throughout their evolution from start-up, to private issuer, to public issuer.

On October 31, 2014, TMX completed its acquisition of the microwave network business of Strike Technologies Services LLC.

On June 2, 2015, TMX Group announced a realignment of the organization. The changes follow the completion of an in-depth strategic review of the organization, which began in January 2015.

On June 16, 2015, TMX Group announced a new initiative. AgriClear, an online platform designed to provide U.S. and Canadian cattle buyers and sellers with an efficient, cost-effective transaction and payment service.

On November 12, 2018, TMX Group launched TMX Matrix, a platform designed to showcase regulated growth companies listed on TSX Venture Exchange.

On June 30, 2020, TMX Group integrated TMX Matrix with TMX Money, its flagship site that provides free real-time stock quotes for retail investors.

In November 2022, it was announced TMX Group had acquired the Boston-based provider of global market-moving action and corporate event data, Wall Street Horizon.

In December 2023, TMX Group acquired a 78% stake in U.S. data analytics company VettaFi Holdings for $848 million.

== Management ==
In September 2004, Stymiest announced the resignation of Barbara Stymiest as CEO of the TSX Group so that she could join the RBC Financial Group to serve as its COO. In December 2004, the TSX Group announced the appointment of Richard Nesbitt as the new CEO of TSX Group. Nesbitt had previously served as president and chief executive officer of HSBC Securities Canada. Nesbitt stepped down in January 2008, and was replaced by Thomas Kloet on July 14, 2008.

On January 18, 2013, TMX Group Limited announced the appointment of Jean Desgagne as president and chief executive of the Canadian Depository for Securities Limited (CDS), Canada's national securities depository, clearing and settlement hub for equity, fixed income and money markets. He replaced Ian Gilhooley, who retired on December 31, 2012.

On May 30, 2013, TMX Group announced the appointment of Deana Djurdjevic to senior vice president, Equities Trading.

On March 17, 2014, TMX Group announced that chief executive Thomas Kloet would retire from the company effective August 31, 2014. The company later announced on August 12, 2014, that Kloet would remain in the role of CEO until October 31, 2014.

On September 29, 2014, TMX Group announced that it had selected Lou Eccleston to lead the organization as its CEO effective November 3, 2014.

On March 2, 2015, TMX Group announced the promotion of Cheryl Graden to senior vice president, Group Head of Legal and Business Affairs and Corporate Secretary. She was also appointed an officer of TMX Group Limited and its subsidiaries.

On July 16, 2015, TMX Group announced that it had named Nicholas Thadaney, president & CEO, Global Equity Capital Markets effective September 1, 2015. Mr. Thadaney, who reports to TMX Group's Chief Executive Officer, is responsible for all of TMX Group's equity listing and trading activity.

== Leadership ==
=== Chief Executive Officer ===
1. Thomas Archie Kloet, 1 May 2008 – 31 October 2014
2. Louis Vincent Eccleston, 3 November 2014 – 10 January 2020
3. John David McKenzie, 10 January 2020 – present

=== Chairman of the Board ===
1. Wayne Charles Fox, 1 May 2008 – 10 May 2012
2. Charles Martin Winograd, 10 May 2012 – 2 May 2023
3. Luc Bertrand, 2 May 2023 – present

== See also ==
- CCP Global
- Toronto Stock Exchange (TSX)
- TSX Venture Exchange
- Montréal Exchange (MX)
- Canadian Depository for Securities
