= Peter M. Brown =

Canadian businessman (born 1941)

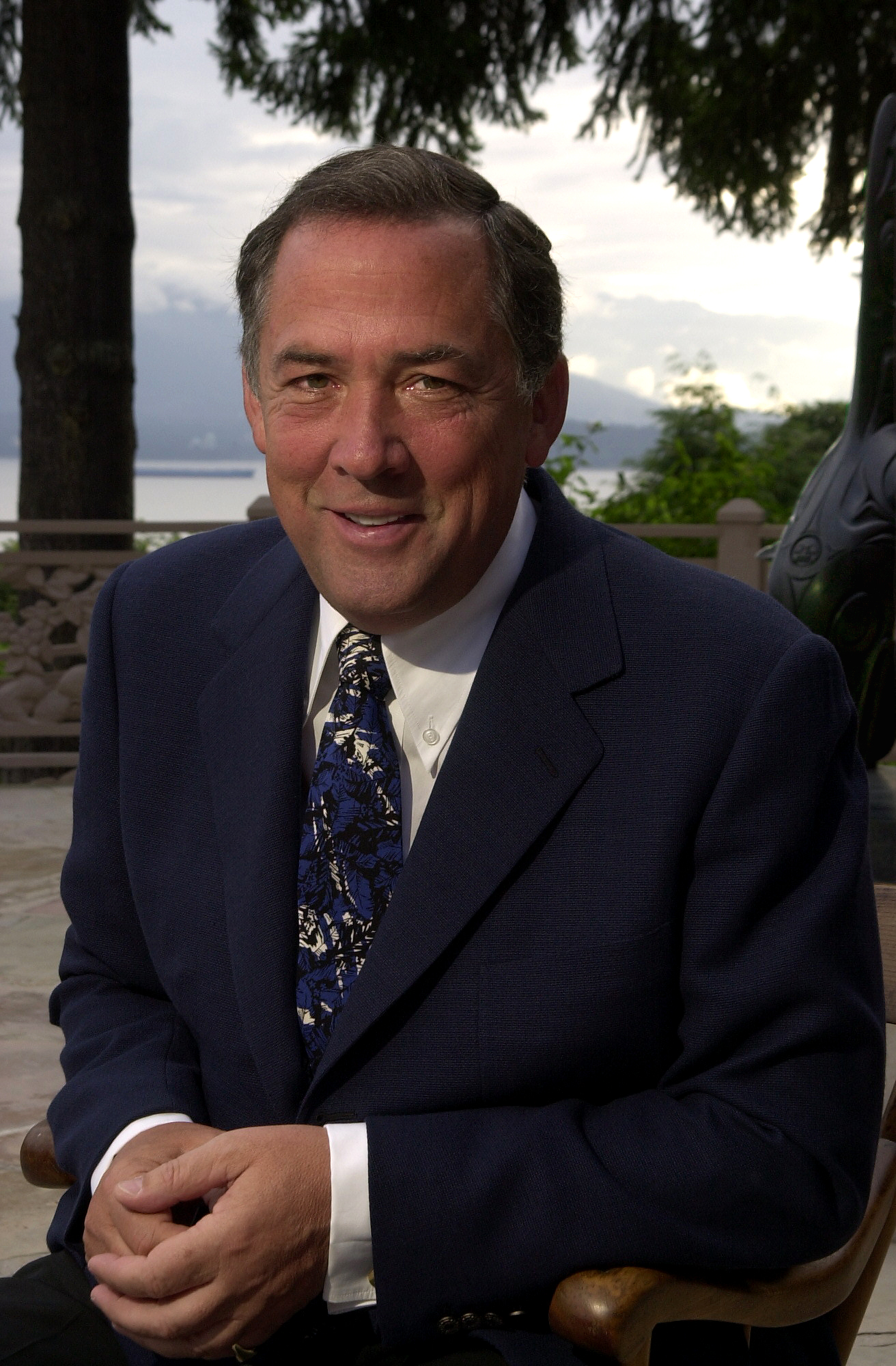
- Peter M. Brown in 2001
- Born: December 15, 1941 (age 84); Vancouver, British Columbia
- Occupation: Financier
- Known for: Co-founder of Canarim Investment Corp. which became Canaccord Genuity
- Spouse: Joanne Brown
- Children: 2
- Honors: Order of British Columbia; LL.D. (h.c.) University of British Columbia, Wilfrid Laurier University; D.Litt. (h.c.) Emily Carr University of Art and Design

Peter MacLachlan Brown (born December 15, 1941) is a Canadian businessman. He founded Canaccord Financial (now Canaccord Genuity), which has become the largest independent investment dealer in Canada. He retired in 2014.

== Early life ==
Peter MacLachlan Brown was born in Vancouver, like his father, Ralph, and grandfather before him. Peter Brown's grandfather Brenton was a well-connected businessman and power broker of his time, head of the Crown Life Insurance Co., onetime president of the Vancouver Board of Trade, and a founder of the right-of-centre municipal NPA party. His grandson would one day follow in his footsteps.

Peter Brown attended the private Shawnigan Lake School and later St. George's School, where he graduated in 1958, as did his brothers Ralph '53, Alan '54, and Robert '68; and his sons James '86 and Jason '89. He studied at the University of British Columbia, entering at age 15 and "majoring in partying", but left at age 20 to work for brokerage firm Greenshields; he worked at various points in Greenshields offices in Montreal, Toronto, and New York. It was during this time, he says, that he turned "from a wastrel into a workaholic".

In 1967 he transferred to his hometown and the next year joined a boutique investment firm called Hemsworth, Turton, and Company. A year later, owner Ted Turton recruited Brown as sales manager, and five years after that, Brown bought into the firm, now renamed Canarim Investment Corp.

== Career ==
It was a rocky start. "Everyone said we'd fail," he has said. Far from it, when noted Canadian historian Peter C. Newman included Brown in the second volume of his Canadian Establishment series, he described the Vancouver financier as "the single most important player on the Vancouver Stock Exchange, underwriting nearly three-quarters of its new issues — worth a projected $225 million in 1981 alone".

Over time, Canarim expanded, opening offices across the Prairies. By 1993, the company, renamed Canaccord Capital, had grown to 400 staff, with investment advisors in six branches across Canada. In 2004, Canaccord went public, raising $70 million in its initial listing on the Toronto Stock Exchange; the year after that, the company also listed on the London Stock Exchange under the symbol CF.

By that time, Brown, then 64, had been at the head of Canaccord, renamed Canaccord Genuity, for almost four decades, and begun to consider succession. "I'd never given it much thought, to be honest," he says. "It was my baby and I guess I sort of imagined I'd be there forever. But I realized I'd had enough. It's a very hard, stressful, Type A business — the market's changing every minute. So I went to Paul Reynolds, who'd worked for me for 24 years, and asked if he wanted to take over". Brown resigned from Canaccord Genuity in 2014.

== Community ==
Peter Brown has served on many boards, including as vice-chairman of Expo 86 and chair of the UBC board of governors, the Vancouver Stock Exchange, BC Place Corporation, and the BC Enterprise Corporation. He was appointed Lead Director and Member of the Finance Committee for the 2010 Winter Olympic & Paralympic Games.

Since retiring he has steered the Peter and Joanne Brown Foundation, dispersing (in 2014) $537,298 to various charities.

== Honours ==
Brown has received formal recognition for his contributions to the financial industry and community.

=== Honorary degrees ===
Peter Brown has received honorary doctorates of law from Wilfrid Laurier University (2015), the Justice Institute of British Columbia (2013), and the University of British Columbia (2005), and an honorary doctorate of letters from the Emily Carr University of Art + Design (2012).

=== Prizes and awards ===
Brown has been recognized many times over his career, including the Order of British Columbia, and lifetime achievement awards from the IIAC Investment Industry Hall of Fame (2015), Canadian Business Hall of Fame (2014), Business Laureates of B.C. Hall of Fame (2011), the Canadian Mining Hall of Fame (2010), and the Ernst & Young Entrepreneur of the Year (2010). In 2012, he was awarded the IIAC Queen Elizabeth II Diamond Jubilee Medal and the Vancouver Board of Trade's Rix Award for Engaged Community Citizenship. In 2009 he was recognized by the Fraser Institute with the T. Patrick Boyle Founder's Award.
