= American Mining and Stock Exchange =

- Type: Commodities and stock exchange
- Location: New York City, United States
- Founded: Circa May 1876
- Closed: July 26, 1877

The American Mining and Stock Exchange was a commodities and stock exchange in New York City. In 1877 it absorbed the competing New-York Open Gold and Stock Exchange. The New York Mining Stock Exchange absorbed the members of the American Mining and Stock Exchange, which had been operating for around fifteen months, on July 26, 1877.

== History ==
The American Mining and Stock Exchange began operations around May 1876.

Around early 1877, there was an attempt to consolidate the New-York Open Gold and Stock Exchange with the American Mining and Stock Exchange, both of which were next door to one-another in New York. On June 8, 1877, the New York Times reported on another "shrewd" attempt to break up and dissolve the New-York Open Gold and Stock Exchange, and merge it with the American Mining and Stock Exchange. According to the committee proposals, the new exchange would be named The Consolidated Mining, Gold, and Stock Exchange of New-York." At the time, however, the committees of both exchanges had not come to an agreement on merging. The matter was decided on June 8 at an executive session. Terms had been agreed on by June 14, 1877. L. W. Badger was appointed chairman.

The New York Mining Stock Exchange returned to 60 Broadway on July 26, 1877, on which day it also absorbed the members of the American Mining and Stock Exchange.

== See also ==
- List of former stock exchanges in the Americas
- List of stock exchange mergers in the Americas
- List of stock exchanges
- Economy of New York City
- Consolidated Stock Exchange
