= Pacific Exchange =

Defunct American regional stock exchange in California (1956–2006)

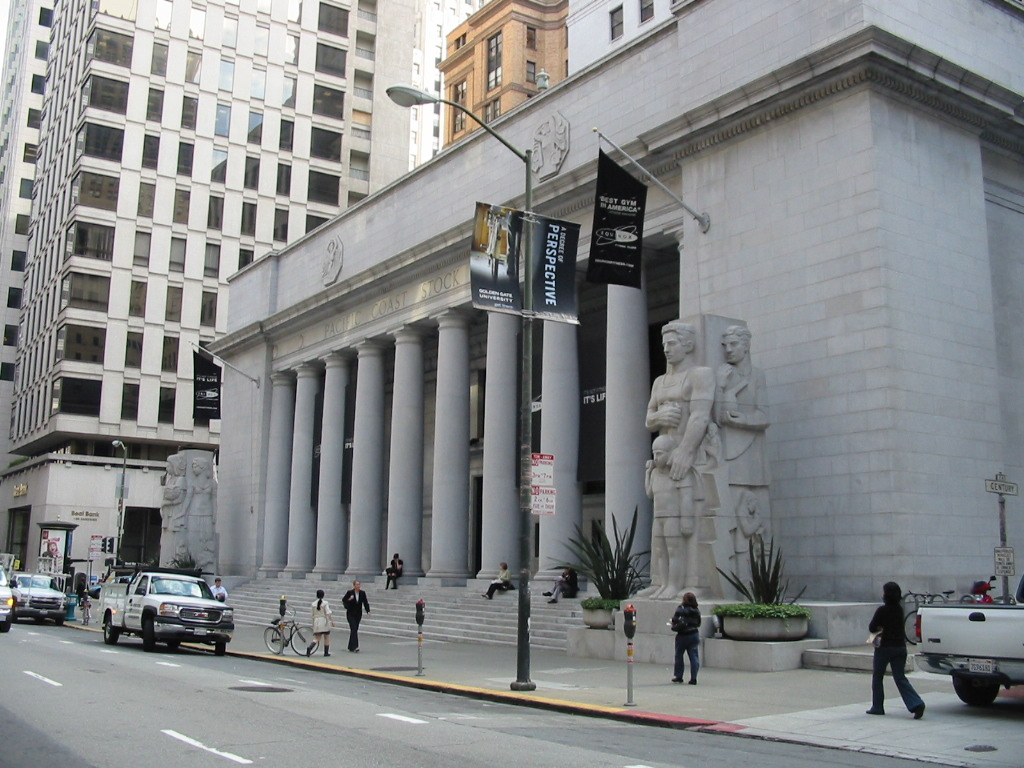
- The former San Francisco Stock Exchange building
- Type: Stock exchange
- Location: San Francisco and Los Angeles, United States
- Coordinates: 37.7919°N 122.4013°W
- Founded: 1956
- Closed: 2006
- Owner: Archipelago Holdings (2005); New York Stock Exchange (2006)
- Currency: United States dollar
- Website: pacificex.com

The Pacific Exchange was an American regional stock exchange in California, from 1956 to 2006. Its main exchange floor and building were in San Francisco, California, with a branch building in Los Angeles, California.

In 1882, the San Francisco Stock and Bond Exchange was founded; and in 1899 the Los Angeles Oil Exchange was founded. In 1956, these two exchanges merged to create the Pacific Coast Stock Exchange, with trading floors maintained in both cities.

In 1973, it was renamed the Pacific Stock Exchange. The Pacific Exchange was bought by Archipelago Holdings in 2005, which merged with the New York Stock Exchange in 2006. Pacific Exchange equities and options trading now take place exclusively through the NYSE Arca platform.

== History ==
Two separate exchanges were founded; the San Francisco Stock and Bond Exchange in 1882 and the Los Angeles Oil Exchange in 1899. In 1956, they merged to create the Pacific Coast Stock Exchange, though separate trading floors were maintained in both cities. In 1973, it was renamed the Pacific Stock Exchange and it began trading options three years later in 1976.

In 1999, the exchange became the first U.S. stock exchange to demutualize. The trading floor in Los Angeles was closed in 2001, followed by the floor in San Francisco a year later. 2003 saw the exchange launch PCX Plus, an electronic options trading platform.

By 2005, the Pacific Exchange was bought by the owner of the ArcaEx platform, Archipelago Holdings, which then merged with the New York Stock Exchange in 2006. The New York Stock Exchange conducts no business operations under the name Pacific Exchange, essentially ending its separate identity. Pacific Exchange equities and options trading now takes place exclusively through the NYSE Arca (formerly known as ArcaEx) platform, an Electronic communication network (ECN), as NYSE Arca Equities and NYSE Arca Options, respectively.

== San Francisco Pacific Exchange building history ==
The San Francisco Pacific Exchange building, which once housed the equities trading floor, is located on Pine Street at the corner of Sansome Street in the Financial District in San Francisco. The building was initially designed in a neoclassical style by architect Milton Dyer in 1915.

It was remodeled in 1930 by the firms Miller and Pflueger, architects James Rupert Miller and Timothy Pflueger; and the interior design was done by architect Michael Goodman. The exterior building sculptures were created in Yosemite granite by artist Ralph Stackpole. Sketches made by Pflueger for the remodel of this building can be found in the permanent collection at San Francisco Museum of Modern Art. After the 1930 remodeling, the building was in an Art Deco Moderne style, with its street facade was clad in Yule marble.

The building was sold to private developers and converted by Equinox Fitness into a fitness center.

== Mills Building ==
An options trading floor in the city of San Francisco still operates in the adjacent Mills Building on the second floor. It was originally connected to the main building and underwent an expansion in September 1984 and expanded again in the mid-1990s with major changes to the layout.

== See also ==
- Los Angeles Stock Exchange Building
- List of former stock exchanges in the Americas
- List of stock exchange mergers in the Americas
- Moderne architecture in California
- Stock exchanges in the United States
