= New York Gold Exchange =

Coordinates: 40.7057°N 74.0098°W

- Type: Exchange
- Location: New York City, United States
- Founded: 1862 on New Street, Manhattan
- Closed: January 1, 1897

The New York Gold Exchange was an exchange formed shortly after the beginning of the American Civil War for the purpose of creating an open market for transactions involving gold and the government-created paper currency, the greenback. Established in 1862, it closed in 1897.

== History ==
=== During Civil War ===
The exchange was established in 1862 in a basement on New Street. The exchange was created during the American Civil War, when the Union issued paper money to fund the war effort. Gold trading was initially banned at the New York Stock Exchange, which viewed the practice as unpatriotic speculation in wartime. This was because Confederate victories resulted in an increase in the price of gold relative to the greenback dollar, causing gold traders to sing "Dixie" in the Exchange when they received news of a Confederate victory. Abraham Lincoln at one point publicly expressed the wish that "every one of them [the gold speculators] had his devilish head shot off."

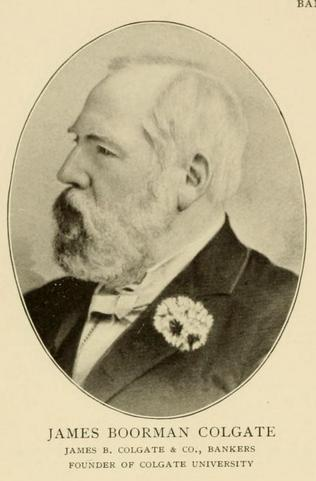
James Boorman Colgate, one of the founders of the New York Gold Exchange, and its president for a time

The banishment of gold trading from the New York Stock Exchange "barely halted the trade for an instant" as gold traders relocated to various basements on Wall Street, William Street, and Broad Street. Trading moved successively from "an ill-lit den called the Coal Hole" to Gilpin's News Room, also called Gilpin's Gold Room. It is unclear who Gilpin was.

On June 17, 1864, Congress, angered by the speculation, passed an act prohibiting gold trades anywhere except for brokers' offices. This briefly shut down the exchange, but unregulated street transactions continued. Speculation was not stymied, and the price of gold relative to greenbacks rose. Congress repealed the law two weeks later.

Gilpin's reopened under the name "New York Gold Exchange" the same year, and was incorporated on October 14, 1864. The New York Gold Exchange's new facility, located at the corner of William Street and Exchange Place, was usually known simply as the Gold Room. The lavishly appointed exchange "anticipated the dawning Gilded Age."

The businessman James Boorman Colgate was a founder and president of the New York Gold Exchange. Other founders of the Gold Exchange included Levi P. Morton, a youthful J. P. Morgan, and other Wall Street figures. Samuel Spahr Laws, a manager of the Gold Exchange, invented the Laws Gold Indicator (a predecessor to the ticker tape machine) to display the current price of gold to both traders on the exchange floor and the public on the street. The annual membership fee was $25, although this was quickly raised to $200, then $1,000, and ultimately to $2,500.

Gold trading was significant for the U.S.'s foreign trade, but the majority of trading on the Exchange was speculative. Historian John Steele Gordon notes that "hundreds of pure speculators" traded at Gilpin's, but that "respectable merchants who needed gold for business purposes or to hedge against fluctuations in the price of greenbacks" also traded there. Business historian Robert Sobel has called the gold exchange "the most informal and certainly the wildest market in American history" because of its wild profit and loss swings, its high rate of bankruptcy and frequent occurrences of "short-changing, adulteration, and late delivery" of gold. After a series of robberies of gold, brokers at the exchange set up a system of private certificates which could be drawn upon deposits at the Bank of New York. As a result of the arrangement, the Bank of New York became the second-largest holder of gold in the nation, after the U.S. federal government. In 1865, however, Edward "E. B." Ketchum of Ketchum, Son & Co. forged more than $1.5 million certificates and then fled; this and other such episodes prompted the establishment of a Gold Exchange Bank, with daily account reserve statements and other anti-fraud measures.

=== Post–Civil War ===
The New York Gold Exchange became part of the New York Stock Exchange in 1865. The Gold Exchange was the locus of the Black Friday financial panic of 1869, which occurred after Jay Gould and James Fisk attempted to corner the market on gold. In the ensuing litigation—heard before Judge Albert Cardozo—David Dudley Field represented Fisk, while Clarence Armstrong Seward and Charles M. Da Costa represented the New York Stock Exchange and New York Gold Exchange.

Gold trading became less profitable as the stock market became more stable, and the Exchange stopped operating on January 1, 1897, after specie resumption.

== See also ==
- List of former stock exchanges in the Americas
- List of stock exchange mergers in the Americas
- List of stock exchanges
- Economy of New York City
