= National Stock Exchange (Jersey City, New Jersey) =

Electronic stock exchange

NYSE National
- Type: Electronic stock exchange
- Location: Jersey City, New Jersey, United States
- Founded: March 1885 in Cincinnati, Ohio as the Cincinnati Stock Exchange
- Currency: United States dollar
- Indices: NSX

The National Stock Exchange (NSX) is an electronic stock exchange based in Jersey City, New Jersey. It was founded March 1885 in Cincinnati, Ohio, as the Cincinnati Stock Exchange.

In 1995, it moved headquarters to Chicago, Illinois, and it was renamed the National Stock Exchange in 2003. After demutualizing in 2006, it moved headquarters to Jersey City. In 2011, CBOE Stock Exchange acquired the National Stock Exchange, with both exchanges operating under separate names. The NSX ceased trading operations on February 1, 2017, when it was acquired by the New York Stock Exchange, and reopened on May 21, 2018.

== History ==
=== Early name changes ===
National Stock Exchange was founded March 1885 in Cincinnati, Ohio, as the Cincinnati Stock Exchange. In 1976, it closed its physical trading floor and became an all-electronic stock market. The Cincinnati Stock Exchange moved its headquarters to Chicago in 1995, and changed its name to the National Stock Exchange – NSX – on November 7, 2003. Owned by its members since inception, it demutualized in 2006. It later moved its headquarters to Jersey City, New Jersey. In September 2011, CBOE Stock Exchange (CBSX) entered into an agreement to acquire the National Stock Exchange. The acquisition was completed on December 30, 2011, with both exchanges to operate under separate names. The National Stock Exchange continued to be based in Jersey City.

=== 2014–2015 shutdown ===
In May 2014, the exchange "changed its pricing structure to charge both sides of a trade a fee for securities priced $1 or more, a departure from other public venues that usually charge one side and pay a rebate to another." With David Harris as chief executive officer, the National Stock Exchange ceased trading operations on May 30, 2014. The exchange stated in a release that it, "continues to be registered as a national securities exchange under Section 6 of the Securities Exchange Act (the "Act") and remains a self-regulatory organization. All NSX rules remain in full force and effect." The closure brought the number of active stock exchanges in the United States to 11, as the CBOE Stock Exchange had closed the month prior. Wrote Bloomberg, "just one public exchange, Chicago Stock Exchange Inc., that isn’t owned Bats, Nasdaq OMX Group Inc. or IntercontinentalExchange Group Inc." On February 24, 2015, the NSX was bought by a private entity known as National Stock Exchange Holdings. Trading resumed on December 22, 2015.

=== NYSE acquisition ===
The New York Stock Exchange announced it has entered into an agreement to acquire the NSX, subject to Securities and Exchange Commission (SEC) approval. The NSX ceased trading operations on February 1, 2017.

NSX was to be renamed "NYSE National" as a result of the acquisition by NYSE.

On January 12, 2018, an SEC filing for rule changes was made to support re-activation of NYSE National, Inc. in the second quarter of 2018 (on the Pillar trading platform). NYSE National opened for business on May 21, 2018. The difference between NYSE National and other NYSE exchanges is that it uses a taker-maker pricing model, which offers rebates for adding liquidity, rather than payment for order flow or other models.

== Previous exchanges named NSX ==
Two previous exchanges, both located in New York City, operated as the National Stock Exchange. The first exchange operated for seven months to September 1869. The other, associated with the New York Mercantile Exchange, traded from March 7, 1962, to January 31, 1975.

== See also ==
- List of stock exchanges
- List of stock exchanges in the Americas
- List of stock exchange mergers in the Americas
