= Arizona Stock Exchange =

Former electronic enabled stock exchange

- Type: Electronically enabled stock exchange
- Location: Phoenix, Arizona, United States
- Founded: 1990 as Wunsch Auction Systems in New York City and Minnesota
- Closed: October 2001; 23 years ago
- Key people: Steve Wunsch (founder)

The Arizona Stock Exchange (AZX) was an electronically enabled stock exchange for extended-hours trading. It was founded in 1990 as Wunsch Auction Systems by R. Steven Wunsch, and moved from New York City to Arizona in 1992. It closed in October 2001 due to lack of trading volume.

== History ==
=== 1990-1991: Founding ===
The exchange was founded in 1990 as Wunsch Auction Systems by R. Steven Wunsch, formerly of Kidder Peabody. The computers were based in Minneapolis, Minnesota, with the headquarters in New York City. The technology trading center in Minnesota was built and run by a group of former Cray Research Supercomputer technologists that included Christopher Moran, Gray Lorig, Kerry Yndestad and Paul Sustman. Due to the exchange's low trading volume and small size, the Securities and Exchange Commission exempted Wunsch and the exchange from regulations, and it went unregistered. The system was an electronic auction for online trading of NYSE, AMEX, and NASDAQ stocks for after-hours trades. The system was not intended for individual investors, but rather large trader entities.

It got off to a "slow start" on Wall Street as a computerized stock trading systems that bypassed "traditional" exchange systems. The company was fought by the New York Stock Exchange. As of December 25, 1991, the exchange allowed about 3,100 stocks to be traded during a day, and the system had 56 customers that were institutions. It also had smaller activity than it needed, with Wunsch saying it needed about 24 customers a day placing orders to attract steady business, while it regularly had no more than a dozen customers per day place orders.

As of 1991, it offered two auctions each day, one taking place a half-hour before the opening of the NYSE, and the other a half-hour after the NYSE closed. The exchange sought to connect bidders and sellers with set desired trade prices, with investors able to go to the other exchanges, either NYSE or regional, if no match was found. Over six months in 1991, Wunsch signed about four dozen institutional investors, with the New York Times describing the project as "the nation's first electronic stock-trading network to be designated a bona fide stock exchange by the Securities and Exchange Commission." It was not the first electronic exchange, but it was the first one set up to directly compete with traditional stock exchanges via price "discovery" in a bidding process. Traditional exchanges "cried foul" over the new exchange, according to the New York Times, with regulators being asked to reconsider what "constitutes a stock exchange." It was worried that although the new exchange had a tiny amount of business, it "theoretically could supplant the Big Board for the large institutional investors." Officials at the NYSE and other exchange argued that the best, easiest trades would be "cherrypicked" by the new exchange. Also, it "threatens to undermine" the NYSE's role as the price setter for corporate shares, according to the New York Times. Later in 1991, 125 institutional investors had signed on.

=== 1991-1992: Move to Arizona ===
In June 1991, the governor of Arizona signed legislation for the state to establish a stock exchange. In December 1991, the state of Arizona approved of Wunsch moving his online electronic auction to Phoenix, Arizona from Wall Street and rename it the Arizona Stock Exchange, or AZX. Formerly Wunsch Auction Systems, Inc. it was later operated by AZX, Inc. Arizona received up to $2 million in loans from Arizona, as well as promotion, to serve as incentive for moving to the state. Although Wuncsch asserted that the new exchange was not another regional stock market, Arizona officials said they hoped local small and medium companies would gain exposure. It was said the office in Arizona would become active in February 1992. Trading commenced on March 30, 1992.

=== 1993-2001: Auctions and closure ===
In April 2001, the SEC granted the Arizona Stock Exchange permission to hold one of its 30-minute live auctions when the markets opened. The exchange auctioned online stocks as though they were antiques or art. Previously, the exchange had only been able to operate on off-hours for a number of reasons, and hadn't been "introduced in a full-form way." Support for the new time slot for the auction came from companies such as Goldman Sachs, J.P. Morgan, Credit Suisse, First Boston and Instinet. The auction's founder and president was Steven Wunsch.

While the idea behind AZX was ahead of its time in the 1990s and anticipated the more successful electronic communication networks such as Archipelago, it closed in October 2001 primarily due to lack of volume.

== Business model ==
Restricted to use by large institutional users only, participants could conduct screen-based trades of equity and other products through either direct dial-up or internet access. The Arizona Stock Exchange was structured as a proprietary "Single Price" electronic call market. Unique to the Arizona Stock Exchange was the ability to discover the best or "single" price for a stock during the auction based upon supply and demand utilizing both an open book and reserve book of equity orders. Operating under a de minimis exemption, it was not required to be registered or regulated as a stock exchange with the U.S. Securities and Exchange Commission (SEC).

The general philosophy behind the Arizona Stock Exchange was to let natural buyers and sellers of equities trade directly with one another without intermediation by a broker or dealer. The AZX sought to reduce transaction costs for its participants, remove volatility from the market and determine more robust and fair pricing for equities traded.

== See also ==
- List of stock exchanges
- List of former stock exchanges in the Americas
