= Montreal Exchange =

Derivatives exchange located in Montreal, Canada

- Bourse de Montréal

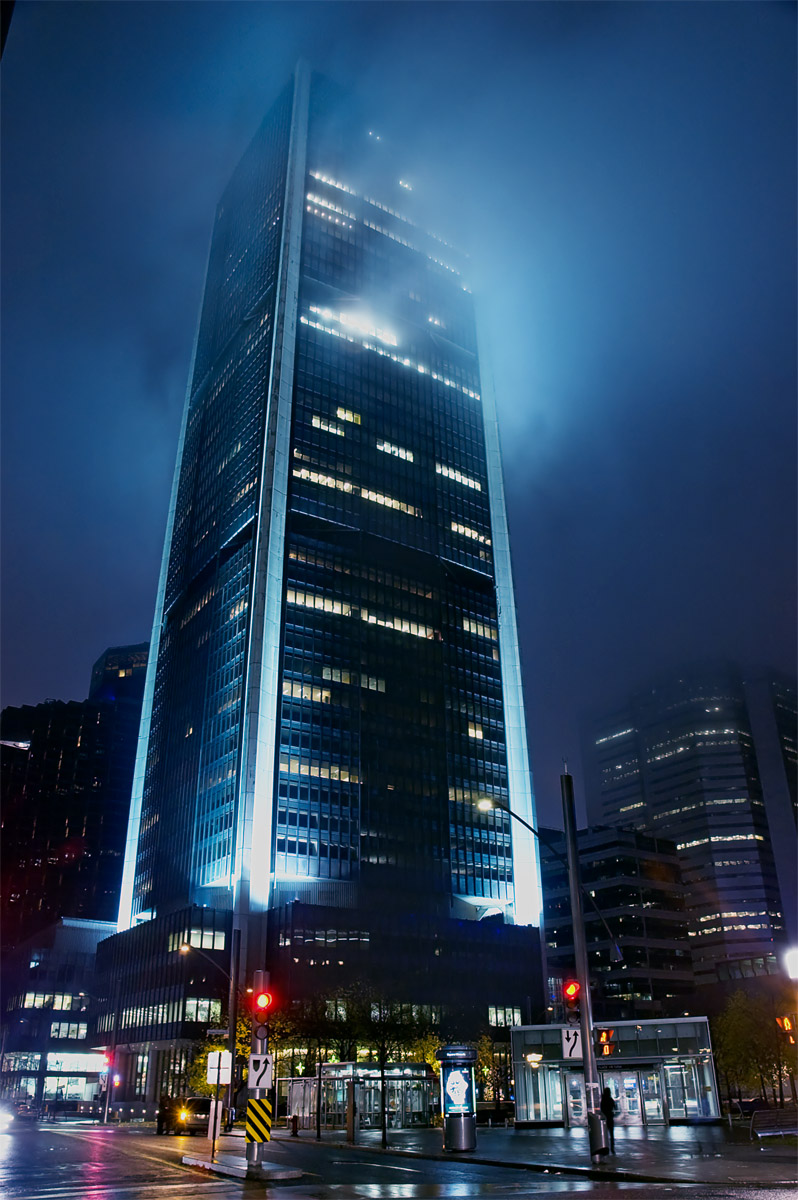
- Type: Derivatives exchange
- Location: Montreal, Quebec, Canada
- Coordinates: 45°30′2″N 73°33′42″W
- Founded: 1832
- Owner: TMX Group
- Key people: Luc Fortin (President & CEO)
- Currency: Canadian dollar
- Indices: S&P/TSX; S&P/TSX 60; S&P/TSX Venture; S&P/TSX Small Cap.; TR Canada 50
- Website: www.m-x.ca/accueil_en.php

The Montreal Exchange (MX; French: Bourse de Montréal), formerly the Montreal Stock Exchange (MSE), is a derivatives exchange, located in Montreal, Quebec, Canada that trades futures contracts and options on equities, indices, currencies, ETFs, energy and interest rates. Since 1965, it has been located in the Tour de la Bourse (Stock Exchange Tower), Montreal's third-tallest building. It is owned by the Toronto-based TMX Group.

== History ==
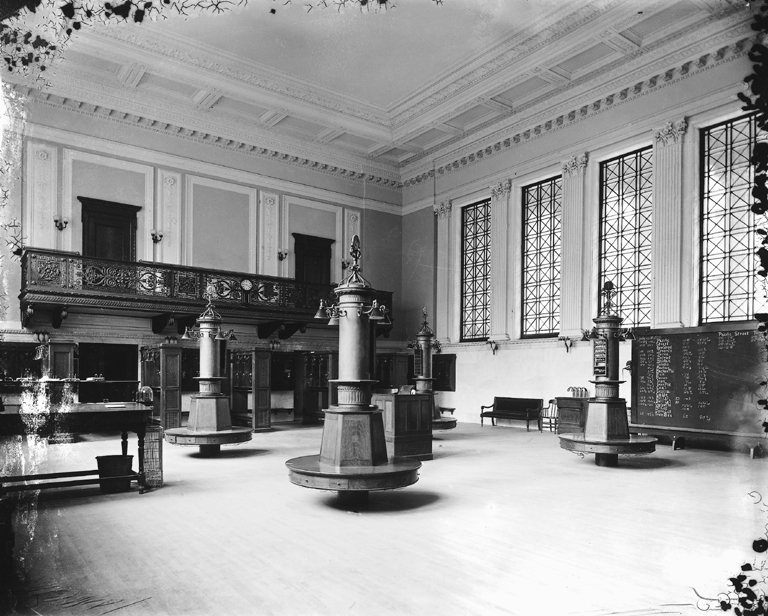
The interior of the Montreal Stock Exchange in 1903. This building is today home to the Centaur Theatre.

=== Montreal Stock Exchange (1874-1982) ===
The first exchange in Canada began in 1832 as an informal stock exchange at the Exchange Coffee House in Montreal. In 1874, Lorn MacDougall, along with his brothers Hartland St. Clair MacDougall and George Campbell MacDougall, James Burnett and Frank Bond were the driving force behind the creation of the Montreal Stock Exchange (a name that was used until 1982 when it became the Montreal Exchange). The shareholders voted Lorn MacDougall its first Chairman of the Governing Committee, a position he held until poor health forced him to retire in 1883.

By 1910, the number of trades amounted to about $2.1 million whereas the Toronto Stock Exchange only amounted to $900,000. The prosperity of the Montreal Stock Exchange led to the creation of major corporations like Dominion Textile and Montreal Light, Heat & Power.

At that time, many major financial institutions established their headquarters on and around Saint Jacques Street. In 1903, the same year as the construction of New York's now famous Exchange Building, the Montreal Stock Exchange commissioned the same architect, George B. Post, to design its building on St. Francois-Xavier Street.

World War I marked the end of Canada's dependence on London's market. By contributing greatly to the war effort, Canada's economy was greatly strengthened by the war. All through the 1920s, Montreal's market experienced strong growth, reaching $3.5 million. In 1926, the "Montreal Curb Market" was created to allow trading in speculative and junior stocks. If successfully grown, they could apply for a transfer to the main Exchange. In 1953, the Curb Market was renamed the Canadian Stock Exchange.

The 1929 crisis hit Montreal especially hard. In 1934, due to multiple factors, the Toronto Stock Exchange surpassed Montreal. Still, Montreal's position in Canada's economy recovered, and it was not until the mid-1970s that Toronto became the metropolis of Canada after a decade of political troubles in Montreal.

=== Decline ===
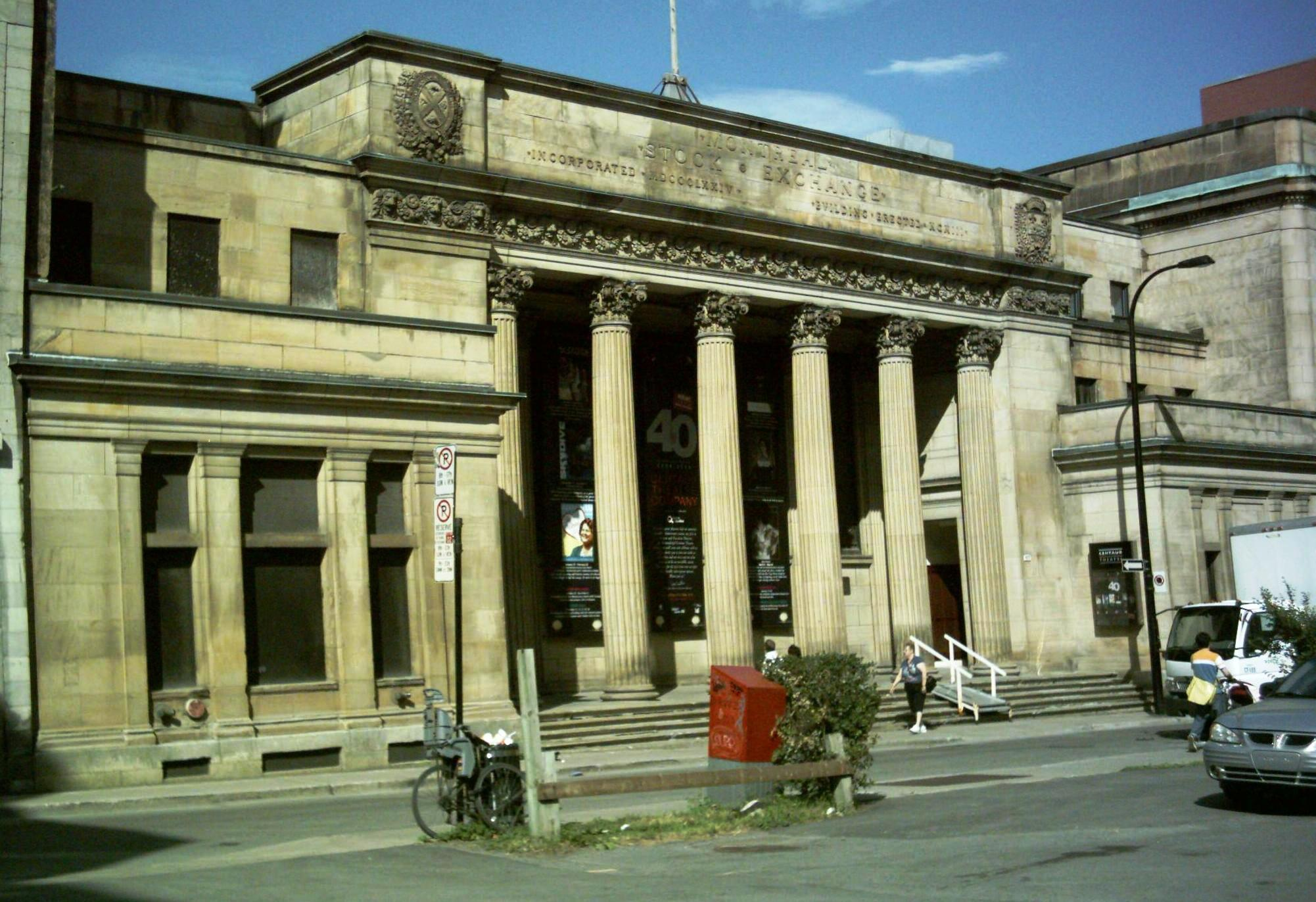
The Beaux-Arts style building that originally served as the Montreal Stock Exchange

For the separatist group Front de libération du Québec, the Montreal Stock Exchange represented a bastion of Anglo-Canadian power. On February 13, 1969, they detonated a bomb at the Stock Exchange that blew out the northeast wall and injured 27 people.

=== Montreal Exchange (1982–present) ===
In 1982, the Montreal Stock Exchange changed its name to the Montreal Exchange to reflect the growing importance of financial instruments other than stocks–primarily options and futures–on its trading floor.

Former Montreal Exchange logo

In 1999, the Vancouver, Alberta, Toronto and Montreal exchanges agreed to restructure the Canadian capital markets along the lines of market specialization, resulting in the Montreal Exchange assuming the position of Canadian Derivatives Exchange for the following 10 years. Trading in the shares of large companies was transferred to the Toronto Stock Exchange (TSX), and in the trading of smaller companies to the new Canadian Venture Exchange (now: TSX Venture Exchange). This change, which reflected the economic reality that most equity trading had moved to the TSE, caused consternation among those in favour of political independence for the province of Quebec.

At the end of 2001, the Exchange had completed its migration from an open outcry environment to a fully automated trading system, becoming the first traditional exchange in North America to complete this transformation. In the process, it modified the market model for trading, from a traditional specialist model to a competing market making model for the equity option market.

In February 2004, the Exchange became the sole provider of electronic trading systems and support for the Boston Options Exchange (BOX), making it the first foreign exchange to be responsible for the day-to-day technical operations of an American exchange using the Sola Trading electronic platform. That contract now provides the Montreal Exchange with a significant part of its revenue. The Montreal Exchange has a 31.4% stake in the Boston Option Exchange (BOX), percentage that has since risen to over 51% (as of September 2009).

On December 10, 2007, TSX Group announced that it had acquired Montreal Exchange Inc. for C$1.31 Billion. The acquisition was completed on 1 May 2008 and the corporation subsequently was renamed TMX Group Inc.

On February 9, 2011, the London Stock Exchange announced that they had agreed to merge with the TMX Group, Montreal Exchange's parent, hoping to create a combined entity with a market capitalization of $5.9 billion (£3.7 billion). Xavier Rolet, who currently is CEO of the LSE Group, would head the new enlarged company, while TMX Chief Executive Thomas Kloet would become the new firm president. Based on data from December 30, 2010 the new stock exchange would be the second largest in the world with a market cap 48% greater than the Nasdaq. Eight of the fifteen board members of the combined entity will be nominated by LSE and seven by TMX. The provisional name for the combined group would be LTMX Group plc.

On June 13, 2011, a rival, and hostile bid from the Maple Group of Canadian interests, was unveiled. A cash and stock bid of $3.7 billion CAD, in hopes of blocking the LSE Group's takeover of TMX. The group is composed of the leading banks and financial institutions of Canada.

== Montreal Curb Market/Canadian Stock Exchange ==
Canadian Stock Exchange
- Montreal Curb Market
- Type: Regional stock exchange, curb market
- Location: Montreal, Canada
- Founded: 1926
- Closed: 1974 (merged)
- Market cap: Small-cap equities

The Montreal Curb Market was a stock exchange created in 1926 for trading in stocks that were considered to be too speculative or junior to be traded on the Montreal Stock Exchange (MSE). As these companies matured, trading in their shares was transferred to the MSE.

In 1953, the Montreal Curb Market changed its name to Canadian Stock Exchange. In 1974, the Canadian Stock Exchange merged with the Montreal Stock Exchange, retaining the larger exchange's name.

On November 29, 1999, the small-cap portion of the equities market of the Montreal Exchange was merged into the Canadian Venture Exchange (CDNX), along with the Alberta Stock Exchange (ASE) and the Vancouver Stock Exchange (VSE). The Canadian Dealing Network and Winnipeg Stock Exchange also merged with CDNX. The Canadian Venture Exchange is today known as the TSX Venture Exchange and is based in Calgary, although still has offices in Montreal.

== Montreal Climate Exchange ==
The Montreal Climate Exchange or MCeX was started as a joint venture between the Montreal Exchange and the now-defunct Chicago Climate Exchange (CCX). It trades futures contracts on greenhouse gases. Established on July 12, 2006, and launched on May 30, 2008, MCeX is the first regulated environmental market in Canada.

=== Background ===
As part of the 2008 federal climate plan, in addition to internal reductions, large regulated industrial emitters in Canada are able to choose to buy emission units on the domestic carbon market. Regulated emitters’ credits are issued by government authorities at the end of a compliance year to regulated emitters that reduce the intensity of their GHG emissions below the target established by the federal government. These emitters are able to sell their credits on the market or keep them for subsequent compliance years. Futures contracts sold on the MCeX are equal to 100 Canada carbon dioxide equivalent units (one metric ton of carbon dioxide equivalent).

=== Timeline ===
- On July 12, 2006, the Montréal Climate Exchange was established as a partnership between the MX and the CCX. The two exchanges finalized the preliminary agreement announced in Montreal on December 7, 2005, during the first meeting of the parties to the United Nations Framework Convention on Climate Change.
- On October 2, 2006, the exchange said the federal government appeared to be moving in the right direction on emissions regulation.
- On October 23, 2006, the exchange promoted a market-based solution to help meet environmental challenges.
- On May 10, 2007, the MX filed for regulatory approval of market rules for trading of MCeX environmental products.
- On July 25, 2007, the Montreal Climate Exchange announced its carbon futures contract would be launched by year end.
- On March 14, 2008, the Montreal Climate Exchange announced plans to launch trading of futures contracts on Canada carbon dioxide equivalent (CO2e) units on May 30, 2008, subject to regulatory approval.

=== MCeX Market Makers ===
- Orbeo
- TD Securities Inc.
- TradeLink LLC

== Leadership ==
=== Chairman ===
From its inception, the Exchange elected an annual governing committee led by a chairman. In 2001, the governing committee was changed to a board of directors. In May 2008, the board was superseded by the board of the new TMX group. Chairmen of the Exchange were:

- May 1874–December 1883 – Dugald Lorn MacDougall
- December 1883–May 1884 – James Burnett
- 1894 – Hartland St Clair MacDougall
- 1895, 1896 – Louis-Joseph Forget
- 1897, 1898 – Hartland St Clair MacDougall
- 1899, 1900 – William Robert Miller
- 1901 – George Hampden Smithers
- 1902, 1903, 1904 – Charles Meredith
- 1905, 1906 – Andrew Alexander Wilson
- 1907, 1908 – Sir Joseph David Rodolphe Forget
- 1909, 1910 – William James Turpin
- 1911 – Henry Gordon Strathy
- 1912, 1913 – John James MacTier Pangman
- 1914 – Hartland Brydges MacDougall
- 1915, 1916, 1917 – Purvis McDougall
- 1918, 1919 – Edgar Maurice Smith
- 1920, 1921 – Collins Simpson Garland
- 1922 – Henry Austin Ekers
- 1923, 1924, 1925, 1926, 1927, 1928, 1929 – Edgar Maurice Smith
- 1930 – Frank Stanton Mathewson
- 1931 – Walter Eduard Julius Luther
- 1932, 1933 – Louis de Gaspé Beaubien
- 1934 – Douglas Stuart McMaster
- 1935, 1936 – Harold Josiah Child
- 1937 – Joseph Ernest McKenna
- 1938, 1939 – Grant Johnston
- 1940, 1941 – Raymond Allan
- 1942, 1943 – Andrew Stuart Beaubien
- 1944, 1945 – Hartland MacDougall Paterson
- 1946, 1947 – Raymond Allan
- 1948, 1949, 1950 – Jacques Forget
- 1951, 1952 – Franklin George McArthur
- 1953, 1954, 1955, 1956 – James Buchanan Weir
- 1957, 1958 – Herbert Kay Crabtree
- 1959, 1960 – Ernest Henry McAteer
- 1961 – Sydney James Langill
- 1962, 1963 – Parker Bancroft Reid
- 1964, 1965 – Ivan Alexander Martin
- 1966 – John Trevor Thompson
- 1967 – Guy-L. Hudon
- 1968, 1969 – Peter Alfred Turcot
- 1970, 1971 – Fred Richard Whittall
- 1972, 1973 – David Leonard Torrey
- 1974, 1975 – Pierre Brunet
- 1976, 1977 – Dominik Dlouhy
- 1978, 1979 – Desmond Neil Stoker
- 1980, 1981 – André Charron
- 1982, 1983 – Brian Paul Drummond
- 1984, 1985 – Louis-Jacques Ménard
- 1986, 1987 –André Desaulniers
- 1988, 1989 – Terence Cleary West Reid
- 1990, 1991 – Gaston Ostiguy
- 1992, 1993 – Raymond Désormeaux
- 1994, 1995 – Claude Bédard
- 1996, 1997 – René G. Jarry
- 1998, 1999 – Luc Bertrand
- 2000 – Jacques O. Nadeau

At the annual meeting on 24 April 2001, the Governing Committee was replaced by a Board of Directors

- 2001, 2002, 2003 – Jacques O. Nadeau
- 2004, 2005, 2006, 2007 – Jean Turmel
Montreal Exchange becomes part of TMX Group on 1 May 2008

=== President ===
In 1956, the exchange created a full-time, salaried presidential role. Presidents of the exchange have been:

1. Henry Gordon Norman, 1 October 1956 – 1 November 1959
2. Eric William Kierans, April 1960 – 31 July 1963
3. George Harris Hees, 1 April 1964 –16 September 1965
4. Charles Bertram Neapole, 1 June 1966 – 1 July 1972
5. Michel Bélanger, 1 January 1973 – 15 April 1976
6. Robert Demers, 15 April 1976 – 8 June 1981
7. Pierre Lortie, 8 June 1981 – 1 June 1985
8. Andre Saumier, 1 June 1985 – 5 January 1986
9. Bruno Riverin, 26 March 1987 – 30 April 1994
10. Gérald Alexandre Lacoste, 30 April 1994 – 2000
11. Luc Bertrand, 29 March 2000 – 30 June 2009
12. Alain Miquelon, 1 July 2009 – 2 August 2016
13. Luc Fortin, 2 August 2016 – present

== See also ==
- List of futures exchanges
- List of stock exchanges
- List of stock exchanges in the Americas
- List of stock exchange mergers in the Americas
- European Climate Exchange
- International Petroleum Exchange
