= Rio de Janeiro Stock Exchange =

Brazil's second largest exchange

- Bolsa de Valores do Rio de Janeiro
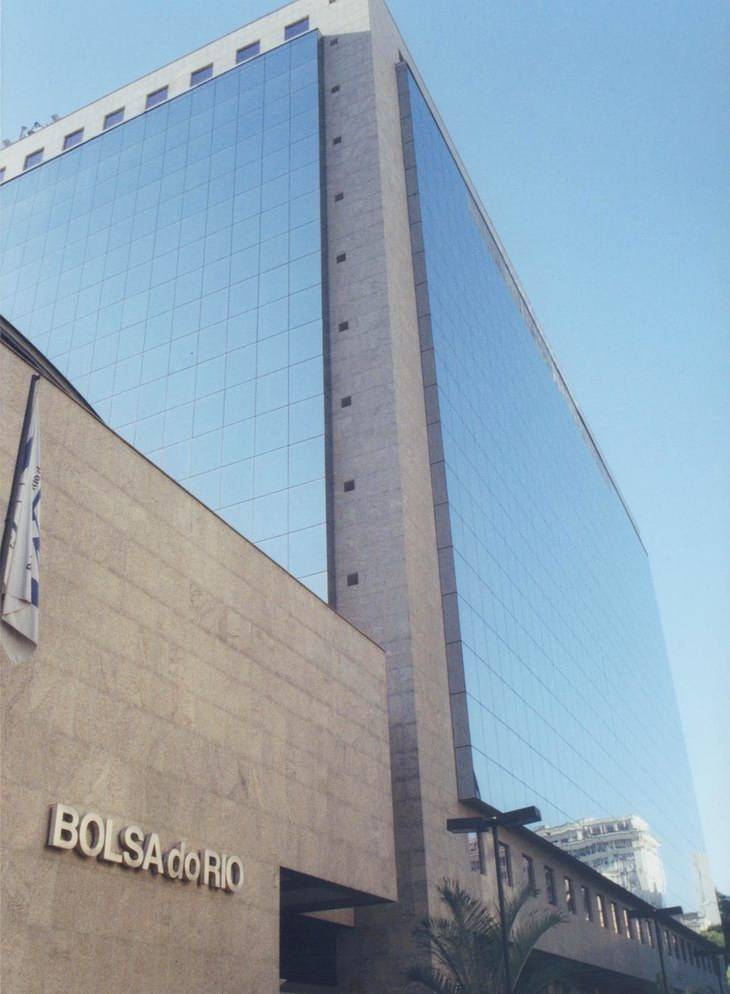
- Type: Stock exchange
- Location: Rio de Janeiro, Brazil
- Founded: 1820
- Owner: Bolsa do Rio Stock Group
- Currency: BRL
- Market cap: USD 1 billion (2007-08)
- Indices: SIXBEX and TCAT
- Website: www.bvrj.com.br

The Rio de Janeiro Stock Exchange (Bolsa de Valores do Rio de Janeiro, or BVRJ) was Brazil's second largest exchange (after the Bovespa stock exchange in São Paulo), and was amongst the oldest of Brazilian stock exchanges. Its inauguration occurred on July 14, 1820, three years after the first Brazilian stock exchange inaugurated, the today inactive Salvador Exchange; and before the Brazilian Independence process began.

It was from its beginning through the early 1970s, the most important Brazilian Exchange. Following the 1971 stock market crash, it slowly lost ground to São Paulo's Bovespa. After a national stock market crash in 1989, BVRJ lost the rank of main stock exchange in Latin America to São Paulo's Exchange. Since, BVRJ traded in government bonds and currencies on the electronic Sisbex system, with the trading hours being from 10 a.m. to 4:45 p.m.

It was sold on April 11, 2002 to Brazilian Mercantile and Futures Exchange (BM&F), which merged with Bovespa (State of São Paulo Stock Exchange). It is now called the BM&FBovespa.

== See also ==
- List of stock exchanges
- Maringá Mercantile and Futures Exchange
