= Standard Stock and Mining Exchange =

Canadian stock exchange (1900–1934)

- Industry: Stock exchange
- Founded: 25 June 1900
- Defunct: 5 February 1934
- Fate: Merged into the Toronto Stock Exchange
- Headquarters: 33 Temperance Street, Toronto, Ontario

The Standard Stock and Mining Exchange (SSME) was a Canadian stock exchange that existed from 1900 to 1934. The SSME was founded in 1900 through the merger of two existing mining exchanges that had been formed in 1898 and 1899 respectively. Throughout its history, the SSME was the world's largest mining exchange and the second largest stock exchange in Toronto. The development of the SSME helped make Toronto the center of Canada's mining industry, which in turn would lead to the city's eclipse of Montreal as the country's financial capital.

Despite its preeminence in Canadian mining financing, the SSME was rife with speculation and fraud. Consequently, following the creation of the Ontario Securities Commission in 1931, the new commission pushed the SSME to merge with the more reputable Toronto Stock Exchange. In February 1934, the SSME merged with the TSE, continuing under the latter's name. As a result of the 1934 merger, today the TSE remains the world's largest market for mining financing.

== Predecessor exchanges ==
=== Toronto Mining and Industrial Exchange ===
The Toronto Mining and Industrial Exchange was formed in the wake of the mining boom in Rossland, British Columbia. In 1896, John Allister Currie travelled to Rossland, and on his return instigated the creation of a mining exchange.

The first evidence of the TMIE came on 14 January 1898, when the Globe reported that the previous day a group of brokers had met to form the exchange. Those present at the meeting were J. A. Currie, C. B. Murray, S. Bassett, F. McPhillips, F. A. Hall, William C. Fox, J. B. Coulthard, R. Dixon, J. Hugo Ross, Lewis Bacque, Edward Strachan Cox, and J. S. Sharp. Currie was elected president, McPhillips as first vice-president, Fox as second vice-president, Murray as secretary, and Basset as treasurer. Membership on the exchange was limited to 15, and the first call would be on Monday, 17 January at 11:30 am. Despite the ostensible origin on 13 January 1898, later sources referred to the exchange as having been founded in "early 1897," while the Standard celebrated its 30th anniversary in January 1927. Given the lack of evidence for the existence of the exchange before 1898, the references to a January 1897 origin likely were errors stemming from a paucity of records.

=== Standard Mining Exchange ===
The Standard Mining Exchange, Ltd was incorporated on 13 April 1899 under a provincial charter and was set up as a joint-stock company. The incorporators were J. M. Staebler, W. Maguire, W. K. Magee, L. R. Arnett, E. G. Parker, A. C. Cornell, and James Curry. The first session of the new Standard Mining Exchange was held on 18 April 1899 at 11:15 am in the Lawlor Building. The formation of the new exchange set off a legal fight between the city's now three exchanges. First, the TMIE filed a deputation with provincial secretary Elihu Davis over the new exchange's use of the name "Mining Exchange," on the grounds that the Toronto Stock Exchange had fought its own use of this name when it filed for its own charter. Then, the Toronto Stock Exchange protested the incorporation of the TMIE and the SME on the grounds that both exchanges infringed on its business. Davis heard the arguments from the three parties on 25 April. Finally, on 3 May, David granted charters to both the Toronto Mining and Industrial Exchange and the Standard Mining Exchange, stating that there was no doubt of the legality of both companies' charters under the Joint Stock Companies Act.

On 27 June, the SME held its first annual general meeting. There, it elected an executive of E. Gartly Parker as president, M. D. Boyd as first vice-president, A. J. Barr as second vice-president, L. R. Arnett as secretary, and F. H. B. Lyon as treasurer. The Standard held its second and final annual meeting on 5 June 1900 where it elected D. F. Maguire as president, M. D. Boyd as first vice-president, W. J. Palmer as second vice-president, L. R. Arnett as secretary, and A. J. Barr as treasurer. Other directors were E. G. Parker, S. R. Clarke, and L. H. Bacque.

== History of the Standard Stock and Mining Exchange ==
=== Formation of the Standard ===
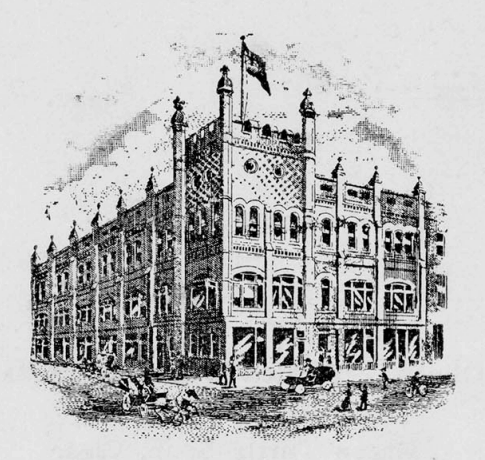
From 1903 to 1912, the exchange was housed at 43 Scott Street

On 5 June 1900, the boards of both exchange met to vote on a merger. On Wednesday, 20 June, the boards of the separate exchanges met for the final time to finalise the details of the merger. The new board joint board met for the first time on Monday, 25 June 1900. Concurrently, L. R. Arnett, secretary of the Standard, released a statement announcing the SME's merger with the TMIE. The statement read: "The Standard Mining Exchange having amalgamated with the Toronto Mining & Industrial Exchange, the consolidated exchange to be known as the Toronto Mining Exchange, all quotations after this date will be issued by the new exchange at the Board of Trade."

The afternoon of the merger, members gathered at the Temple Café in the Temple Building for a celebratory lunch. The menu was mining-themed and featured Black Tail soup, Golden Star radishes, Granby gherkins, Wa Wa potatoes, chicken timbale with Iron Mask, War Eagle sauce, Crow's Nest, Smuggler, and Deer Park salads, Golden Hills cream, Virginia ice cream, Rossland biscuits, Spokane cheese, and Amalgamation café noir. The Globe reported that "the cordial spirit of fraternity among the brokers was thoroughly demonstrated, and the lions and the lambs, the bulls and the bears, the buyers and the sellers, vied with one another in showing the depth of the harmony and good feeling which now predominate."

Legally, the new exchange was a continuation of the 1899 Standard Mining Exchange, Ltd, which was a joint-stock company. The name then was changed to the Toronto Mining Exchange, Limited. At some point in late 1901, the government extended the powers of the exchange to buy and sell stocks of companies outside the mining industry. At this time, the name of the exchange was changed to the Standard Stock and Mining Exchange Limited.

In September 1903, the SSME left the Board of Trade Building and took up quarters at 43 Scott Street.

On 29 December 1908, a new provincial corporation was chartered called the Standard Stock and Mining Exchange. The new corporation took over the assets of the Standard Stock & Mining Exchange Ltd, at which time the exchanged ceased to be joint-stock company.

On 2 July 1912, the Exchange opened its new quarters at 56 King Street West.

On 7 January 1927, the exchange moved into the Imperial Trusts building at 15 Richmond Street West. The new quarters were opened by O. C. Bateman, secretary of the Ontario Mining Association.

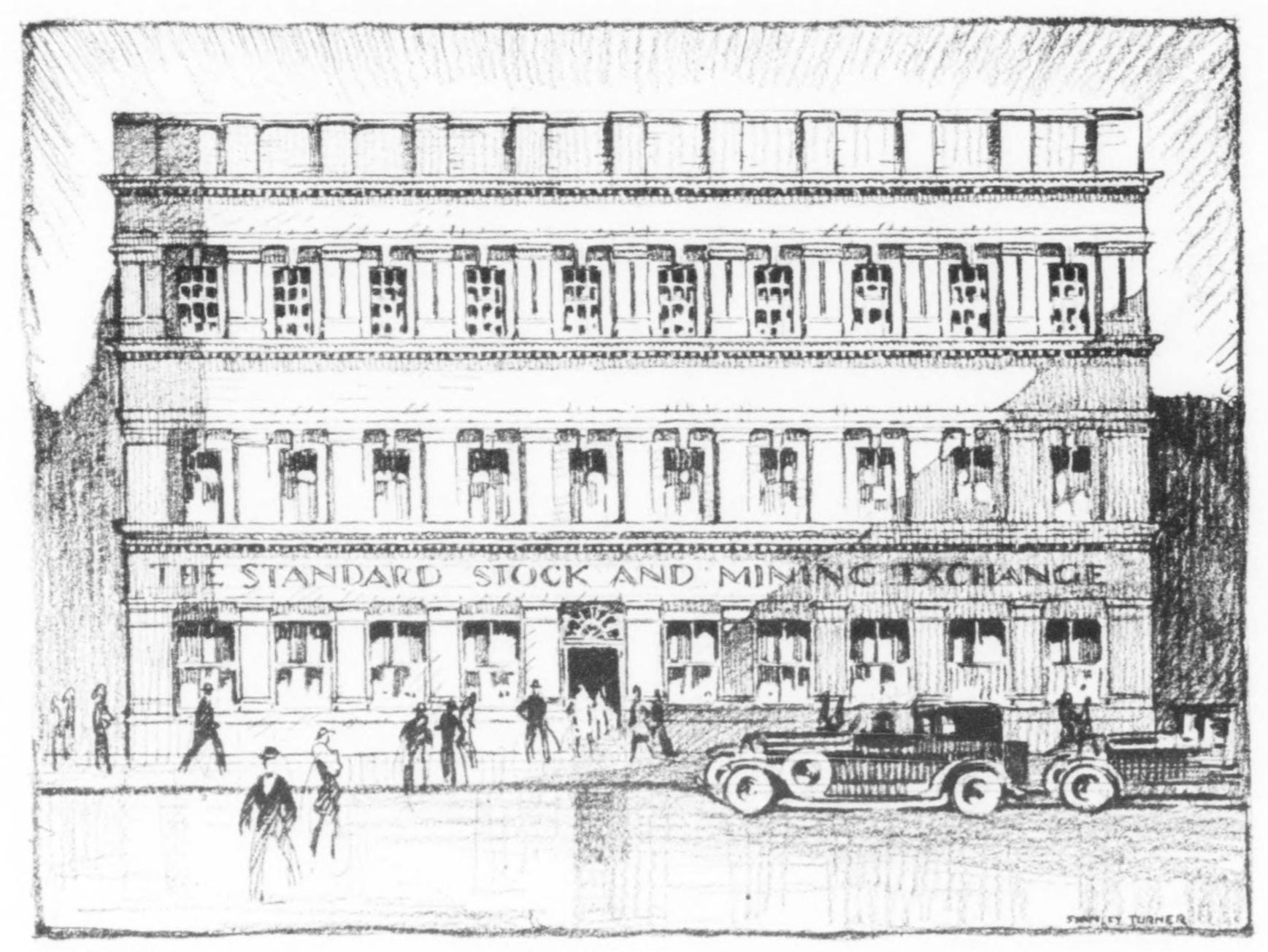
Illustration by Stanley Francis Turner of the Temperance Street building. The exchange was housed here from 1929 to 1934.

In October 1928, the SSME purchased the Bell Telephone Building at 33 Temperance Street for $265,000. The building had been vacant for several years. Subsequently, the exchange hired architects George, Moorhouse & King to plan the conversion. This would include raising the roof five feet and installing a 90-foot quotation board. Among the features of the new exchange were a 63 by 80 foot trading floor illuminated by skylights, 62 telephone booths, six trading posts, and oak-paneled gallery, and a pneumatic tube system. On the evening of Thursday, 27 June 1929, the exchange held a gala dinner on the trading floor to open the new building. The building was opened officially by premier Howard Ferguson. Other dignitaries included mayor Sam McBride, Ontario attorney general William Herbert Price, and Ontario minister of mines Charles McCrea. Trading began at the new quarters on Tuesday, 2 July 1929 following the Dominion Day holiday.

Beginning on 7 November 1929, the Financial Post published a ten-part exposé on the activities of members of the SSME. The series outlined a litany of dishonest behaviours engaged in by members of the exchange. The tenth and final piece in the series was published on 9 January 1930 with the headline "Mining engineers find incompetent shysters bring disrepute upon profession."

The reporting by the Post instigated a response from the provincial attorney general. On 30 January 1930, the Toronto Police, under order from the attorney general, executed a series of arrests of brokers and raids of brokerage offices. Shortly before 8 am that day, the police arrested ten brokers and three material witnesses at their homes. Warrants were issued for the arrests of three additional brokers who were out of the province at the time. Once the brokers had been taken to city hall, the police then raided the offices of their firms, sending employees home and seizing all records and assets. The firms raided were known as the "big five" in mining brokerages; these were Solloway, Mills & Co., Arthur E. Moysey & Co., D. S. Paterson & Co., Homer L. Gibson & Co., and Stobie, Furlong & Co. Collectively, these five firms owned 26 of the 50 seats on the SSME. The brokers arrested were D. S. Paterson, Austin Campbell, Edgar E. McLean, James J. Heppleston, W. J. Shutt, Malcolm Stobie, C. J. Furlong, Gordon Draper, and William J. Smart. Warrants were issued for W. J. Wray, who was in Montreal, and for Isaac Solloway and Harvey Mills, who were in Alberta.

=== Merger into the Toronto Stock Exchange ===
George A. Drew, the first chairman of the Ontario Securities Commission, instigated the merger of the SSME into the TSE.

In January 1934, the boards of governors of both exchanges met to elect an executive for the merged exchange. Harold Franks, who had been president of the TSE for one year, would continue as president, while Gordon Walter Nicholson, who had been president of the SSME in 1933 and 1934, would be vice-president. Norman Currie Urquhart, who had been president of the SSME in 1928 and 1929, would be secretary, and Frank Gordon Lawson, the current secretary of the TSE, would be treasurer. In addition to these officers, additional governors elected to the board were Harry Broughton Housser, Edwin Gordon Wills, D'Arcy Manning Doherty, and James Scott.

At the time of the merger, the resulting institution was referred to as a new entity. For example, on the day of the merger, the Globe proclaimed that "today Canada makes a notable addition to its financial institutions in the formation of the new Toronto Stock Exchange." However, today, the merged institution considers itself the perpetuation of the original Toronto Stock Exchange, whose history dates to 1851.

Following the merger, the Temperance Street exchange building remained in use. Mining shares continued to be traded at this location, while all others shares were traded on the TSE floor. Following the opening of the new Toronto Stock Exchange building in March 1937, the Temperance building was closed and then demolished in September 1938. The TSE sold the property in June 1941.

== Leadership ==
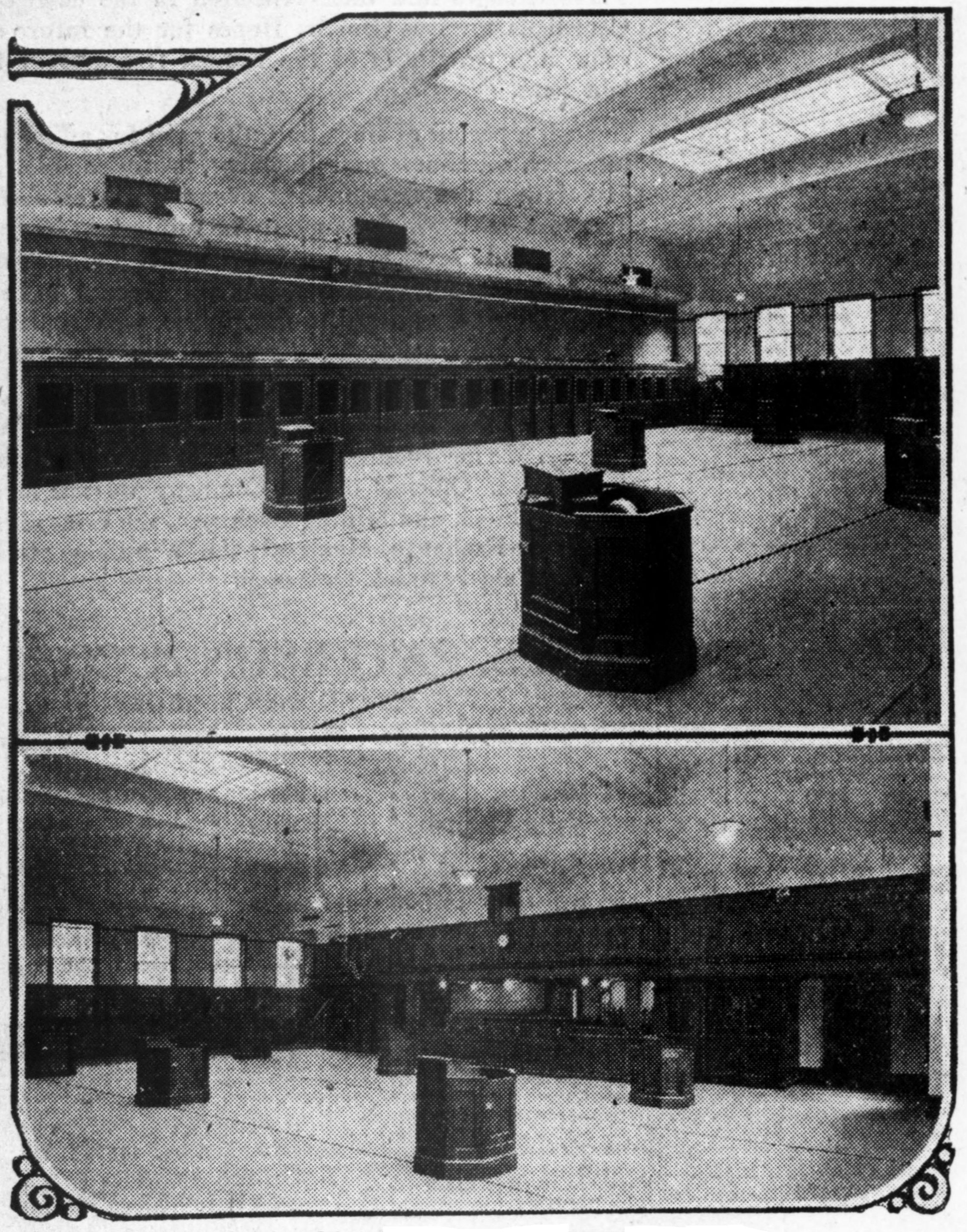
The trading floor at the Temperance Street exchange

Presidents of the Standard Stock and Mining Exchange were:

- 1900, 1901 – Edward Strachan Cox
- 1902, 1903 – Joseph Lawlor Mitchell
- 1904 – unknown
- 1905, 1906 – Arthur Gowan Strathy
- 1907, 1908 – George Stevenson
- 1909 – William Claude Fox
- 1910 – John Marvin Wallace
- 1911 – Joseph Lawlor Mitchell
- 1912, 1913 – James Arthur McCausland
- 1914, 1915 – David Gilbert Lorsch
- 1916, 1917 – John Taylor Eastwood
- 1918, 1919 – Louis James West
- 1920 – Patrick William Cashman
- 1921, 1922 – Joseph Promise Cannon
- 1923, 1924 – Fred Asa Hall
- 1925 – Philip Grattan Kiely
- 1926, 1927 – Frederick Joseph Crawford
- 1928, 1929 – Norman Currie Urquhart
- 1930, 1931 – Frederick Joseph Crawford
- 1932, 1933 – Gordon Walter Nicholson
