= TSX Venture Exchange =

Canadian stock exchange

- Type: Stock exchange
- Location: Calgary, Alberta and Vancouver, British Columbia, Canada
- Founded: November 29, 1999
- Website: www.tsx.com

The TSX Venture Exchange is a stock exchange in Canada. It is headquartered in Calgary, Alberta and Vancouver, British Columbia, with offices in Toronto and Montreal. All trading through the Exchange is done electronically, so the Exchange does not have a "trading floor". It was previously known as the Canadian Venture Exchange (CDNX), but in 2001 the TSX Group (now known as the TMX Group) purchased it and renamed it.

The TMX Group also owns the Toronto Stock Exchange (TSX). The Toronto Stock Exchange is the senior equity market, while the TSX Venture Exchange is a public venture capital marketplace for emerging companies.

As of November 2010, the TSX Venture Exchange had 2,364 listed companies with a combined market capitalization of $60,811,203,235.

== History ==
The Canadian Venture Exchange was created in Canada on November 29, 1999 as a result of an agreement among the Vancouver, Alberta, Toronto and Montreal exchanges to restructure the Canadian capital markets along the lines of market specialization.

The CDNX was created by the merger of the Vancouver Stock Exchange (VSE) and the Alberta Stock Exchange (ASE). The focus of the CDNX was junior companies, i.e., those whose assets, business and market capitalization were too small to be listed on the Toronto Stock Exchange (TSX). Often, these were resource exploration companies, but also came to include new high technology ventures. The exchange had its corporate headquarters in Calgary, Alberta, and its Operations headquarters in Vancouver, British Columbia, with additional offices in Toronto and Montreal. The small-cap portion of the equities market of the Bourse de Montréal (MSE) was also merged into CDNX at this time.

The Winnipeg Stock Exchange merged into the CDNX, and trading on WSE securities ceased Nov 24 2000, and eligible listings were transferred to CDNX on Nov 27 2000.

== See also ==
- TSX Venture 50
- List of stock exchanges
- List of stock exchanges in the Americas
- List of stock exchanges in the Commonwealth of Nations
- List of stock exchange mergers in the Americas
- Montreal Curb Market/Canadian Stock Exchange, the early predecessor small-cap market of Canada
