= Regional stock exchanges of the United States =

American financial infrastructure

All SEC-registered stock exchanges are considered by the SEC to be "national stock exchanges" and part of the National Market System. But traders often refer to NYSE and Nasdaq (the major listing exchanges) as "national", and refer to the other exchanges as "regional". This is only a colloquial term and not officially defined.

Under the SEC's Unlisted Trading Privileges (UTP) rule, essentially every exchange can trade every stock.

== History of regional stock exchanges ==
The SEC was formed in 1934, and that year, a total of 24 securities exchanges registered with the SEC, while 19 received temporary exemptions from registration. Exchanges actively trading that year included the New Orleans Stock Exchange, the Richmond Stock Exchange, the San Francisco Curb Exchange, the San Francisco Mining Exchange, and the St. Louis Stock Exchange. Ten stock exchanges closed after the SEC was created, including the Boston Curb Market, the Buffalo Stock Exchange, the Chicago Curb Exchange, the Denver Stock Market, the Hartford Stock Market, the Milwaukee Grain and Stock Exchange, the New York Mining Exchange, the New York Real Estate Securities Exchange, the Seattle Stock Exchange, and the Wheeling Stock Exchange. The New York Produce Exchange decided to stop trading in securities as well.

In April 1941, eighteen regional stock exchanges received invitations to "parley" with the SEC on possible amendments to the Securities Act to be presented to Congress that May. The exchange representatives attended the conference on April 28, 1941, to discuss the issue.

== List of regional stock exchanges ==
=== Current ===
The current (September 2026) list of SEC-registered stock exchanges are:

- NYSE Arca (which combined the former Archipelago ECN, and Pacific Stock Exchange (PSE), acquired by NYSE in 2006)
- CBOE EDGX
- CBOE BATS BZX
- IEX (Investors' Exchange)
- MEMX (Members' Exchange)
- CBOE EDGA
- MIAX Pearl
- CBOE BATS BYX
- Nasdaq Texas (formerly Boston Stock Exchange or BSE or BSX), acquired by NASDAQ in 2007
- NYSE American (formerly American Stock Exchange or AMEX)
- NYSE National (formerly National Stock Exchange or NSX)
- Nasdaq PSX (formerly Philadelphia Stock Exchange or PHLX)
- 24X exchange
- Long Term Stock Exchange or TSXE
- NYSE Chicago (formerly Chicago Stock Exchange or CHX)

"National" exchanges, not considered "Regional"

- NYSE
- Nasdaq

One can see the list of exchanges and their daily trading volume here: https://www.nasdaqtrader.com/trader.aspx?id=FullVolumeSummary

=== Historical ===
There used to be many more such exchanges in the United States. Among those that have become defunct or have merged into the survivors listed above are

- The Cincinnati Stock Exchange moved to Chicago and changed its name to the National Stock Exchange. Then it was bought by NYSE and became NYSE National.
- Baltimore, which merged with Philadelphia in 1949 (Baltimore Stock Exchange)
- Buffalo, New York, which closed in 1936 (Buffalo Stock Exchange)
- Cleveland, which merged with Chicago in 1949 (Cleveland Stock Exchange)
- Colorado Springs, which closed in 1966 (Colorado Springs Stock Exchange)
- Denver, which closed in 1936 (Denver Stock Exchange)
- Detroit, which closed in 1976 (Detroit Stock Exchange)
- Hartford, which closed in 1934 (Hartford Stock Exchange)
- Honolulu, which closed in 1977 (Honolulu Stock Exchange)
- Los Angeles and San Francisco, which merged to form the Pacific Exchange in 1957 (Los Angeles Stock Exchange, San Francisco Stock and Bond Exchange)
- Louisville, Kentucky, which closed in 1935 (Louisville Stock Exchange)
- Milwaukee, which closed in 1938 (Milwaukee Stock Exchange)
- Minneapolis-St. Paul, which merged with Chicago in 1949 (Minneapolis-St. Paul Stock Exchange)
- New Orleans, which merged with Chicago in 1959 (New Orleans Stock Exchange)
- Pittsburgh, which merged with Philadelphia in 1969 (Pittsburgh Stock Exchange)
- Richmond, Virginia, which closed in 1972 (Richmond Stock Exchange)
- St. Louis, which merged with Chicago in 1949 (St. Louis Stock Exchange)
- Salt Lake City, which closed in 1986 (Intermountain Stock Exchange)
- Seattle, which closed in 1942 (Seattle Stock Exchange)
- Spokane, Washington, which closed in 1991 (Spokane Stock Exchange)
- Washington, D.C., which merged with Philadelphia in 1953 (Washington Stock Exchange)
- Wheeling, West Virginia, which closed in 1965 (Wheeling Stock Exchange)

== See also ==
- List of stock exchanges
- Financial market infrastructure
- United States territory
- Regions of the United States
- Political divisions of the United States
- List of former stock exchanges in the Americas
- List of stock exchanges in the Americas
