= New Orleans Stock Exchange =

- Type: Regional stock exchange
- Location: New Orleans, Louisiana, United States
- Closed: 1959
- Key people: William Huger (early president)

The New Orleans Stock Exchange, or the New-Orleans Stock Exchange, was a regional stock exchange based in New Orleans, Louisiana. As early as 1880, the exchange's sales of stock reached a reported total of $7,891,300. The exchange moved into a new building in 1906, described as the most expensive and artistic structure of its size in the city. At the time, membership was limited to seventy members, with 61 "visiting members." In 1959, the exchange board voted to merge with the Midwest Stock Exchange in Chicago.

== History ==
=== 1800s-1900: Founding and early history ===
In 1880, the exchange's sales of stock reached a reported total of $7,891,300, with 52,609 shares being exchanged. In 1887, the exchange extended its hours to 4 pm due to increased trading volumes. In September 1889, the exchange was reported "paralyzed" after developments in a State bond swindle, with the New York Times reporting that "transactions in [Louisiana] State and city Government securities are at a standstill." As of 1894, Captain William Huger of New Orleans was president of the New-Orleans Stock Exchange.

=== 1901-1946: Changes in the exchange ===
The New Orleans Stock Exchange moved into a new building in 1906, described as the most expensive and artistic structure of its size in the city, and build of marble and mahogany. At the time, the value of the exchange's membership share had grown from an initial $100 to over $6,000, with membership limited to seventy members. In 1906, there were also provisions for "visiting members," with 61 at the time. On December 14, 1907, a special meeting of the exchange held a unanimous vote to re-open for general business on January 15, 1908. The exchange continued to trade in bonds during the interim, but not stocks.

In August 1914, the New Orleans exchange closed for stock trading due to the outbreak of World War I. The former president of the exchange, Eugene Chassanoil, reportedly shot and killed himself at the exchange on August 14, 1914. The Times reported that the 67-year old had been in ill-health for some time. As of April 1927, Cartwright Eustis served as president of the New Orleans Stock Exchange. In February 1928, the exchange was closed on a Saturday so members could attend the opening of Pontchartrain Bridge. On December 22, 1931, the exchange voted to discontinue the trading of bank stocks.

In October 1933, Louisiana Senator Huey Long was challenged by John Dane of the exchange for calling the New Orleans Stock Exchange a "gambling house," with Dane writing that "our little Exchange in New Orleans is a true investment exchange if there is any such thing in the world." On November 29, 1938, a hearing was set by the SEC in New Orleans for the New Orleans Stock Yards, Inc. to stop listing its $100-par-value common stock on the New Orleans Stock Exchange. The application was granted by the SEC, effective on January 16, 1939.

In April 1941, the New Orleans Stock Exchange was one of 18 eighteen regional stock exchanges that received invitations to "parley" with the SEC on possible amendments to securities laws. The exchange representatives, Fred N. Ogden and Robert R. Wolfe, both attended the conference on April 28, 1941 to discuss proposed amendments to the Securities Act to be presented to Congress that May.

=== 1948-1959: Merger with the Midwest Exchange ===
In November 1948, the New Orleans Stock Exchange was invited to take part in meetings concerning the formation of a new Consolidated Regional Exchange, along with representatives from the Cleveland Stock Exchange, Cincinnati Stock Exchange, St. Louis Stock Exchange, Minneapolis-St. Paul Stock Exchange and Chicago Stock Exchange. On January 30, 1958, it was announced that Walter D. Kingston Sr. had been elected president of the New Orleans Stock Exchange. In 1959, the exchange board voted to merge with the Midwest Stock Exchange in Chicago. With the merger, Walter D. Kingston was president of the New Orleans Stock Exchange, with all eligible stocks on the New Orleans exchange transferred to the Midwest exchange. Also, Kingston said that "all transfer agents and registrars [for handling stocks] of New Orleans issues will remain solely in our city, to the benefit of New Orleans banks. Furthermore, all commissions earned by New Orleans members will be retained in our city, due to the Midwest exchange's unique clearing-by-mail plan." Among the companies on the New Orleans exchange at the time were the department store D. H. Holmes, Standard Fruit, New Orleans Public Service, Gulf States Utilities, and others.

== Key people ==
- Captain William Huger (early president)
- Walter D. Kingston Sr. (president 1958-until merger)

== See also ==
- List of former stock exchanges in the Americas
- List of stock exchange mergers in the Americas
