= Detroit Stock Exchange =

Stock exchange in Detroit, Michigan, U.S.

- Type: Private regional stock exchange
- Location: Detroit, Michigan, United States
- Coordinates: 42°19′44″N 83°2′46″W
- Founded: 1907
- Closed: July 1976
- Currency: USD

The Detroit Stock Exchange was a stock exchange in Detroit, Michigan, U.S.

== History ==
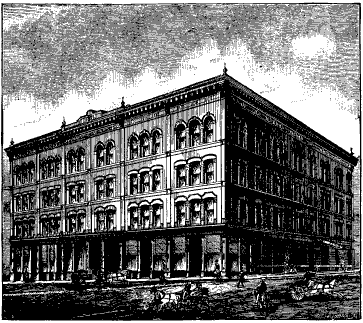
The Detroit Stock Exchange first opened in the Moffat Building in 1907

The Detroit Stock Exchange was established and began operations in 1907 at the Moffat Building. It later moved to the Dime Building before relocating to larger trading quarters in the Penobscot Building in 1919. On March 2, 1931, it began floor trading in the dedicated Detroit Stock Exchange building at the southwest corner of Griswold and Larned streets.

At its peak in the late 1920s, the exchange was one of the largest stock exchanges in the United States by trading volume, ranking behind the New York Stock Exchange, the New York Curb Exchange, the Chicago Stock Exchange, the Boston Stock Exchange, and the San Francisco Stock Exchange.

After the United States Securities and Exchange Commission abolished fixed commissions in 1975, trading volume on the Detroit Stock Exchange plummeted as local brokers shifted to larger exchanges in New York City. Thereafter, its members voted to close the exchange, holding their final trading day on June 30, 1976, and formally dissolving in July.

== Notable listed stocks ==
- Ford Motor Company of Canada
- General Motors
- Durant Motors
- Columbia Motors
- Packard
- Paige-Detroit
- Continental Motors Company
- Reo Motor
- Detroit Edison
- S. S. Kresge Corporation
- Burroughs Adding Machines Company
- Parke, Davis & Co.

== See also ==
- List of former stock exchanges in the Americas
