= Henrotin =

Henrotin is a surname. Notable people with the surname include:

- Charles Henrotin (1843–1914), American businessman
- Daniel Henrotin, comic book artist
- Ellen Martin Henrotin (1847–1922), American social reformer
- Sylvie Jung Henrotin (1904–1970), French female tennis player
