= George Ferris =

George Ferris may refer to:

- George Ferris (cricketer) (born 1964), former cricketer for the Leeward Islands and Leicestershire
- George Washington Gale Ferris Jr. (1859–1896), American inventor of the Ferris wheel
- George Ashmead Ferris (1859–1958), American architect
  - George A. Ferris & Son, an architectural firm in Reno, Nevada
- George M. Ferris (1893–1992), American investment banker and philanthropist
- George M. Ferris Jr. (1927–2008), American investment banker and philanthropist
