= Exchange Building (Seattle) =

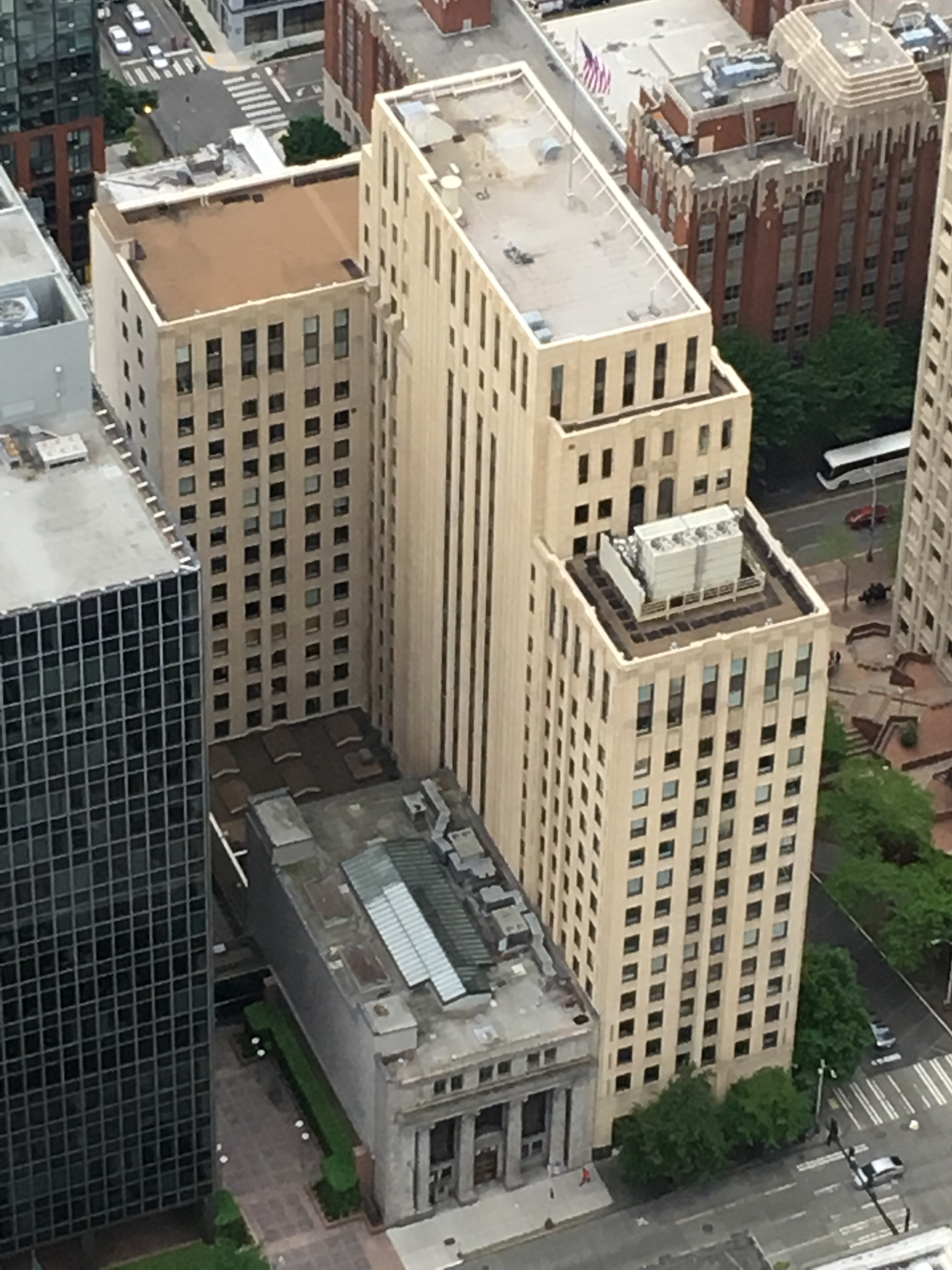

- Location within Downtown Seattle
- Alternative names: United Exchange Building

General information
- Type: Commercial offices
- Location: 821 Second Avenue; Seattle, Washington
- Coordinates: 47.604254°N 122.334814°W
- Completed: 1930
- Owner: Beacon Capital Partners

Height
- Roof: 83.82 m (275.0 ft)

Technical details
- Floor count: 23
- Floor area: 27,549 m^{2} (296,530 sq ft)

Design and construction
- Architects: John Graham & Associates; Mithun Architects
- Main contractor: Turner Construction

Seattle Landmark
- Designated: April 16, 1990

The Exchange Building is a 23-story (275 ft) Art Deco office building located in the central business district of Seattle, Washington. It was designed to house the Seattle Stock Exchange by John Graham & Associates and completed in 1930.

John Graham, an English-born architect, also designed many other landmark Seattle buildings, including the downtown Frederick & Nelson (now Nordstrom), the downtown Bon Marché (now a Macy's), and the Dexter Horton Building.

At the time of its completion, the Exchange Building was the second-tallest reinforced concrete skyscraper in the United States. Early tenants included General Electric, Standard Oil, Edison Lamp Works, and Underwriters Laboratories. Later tenants included Pacific Northwest Bell and the Municipality of Metropolitan Seattle. As of 2016, major tenants include Slalom Consulting, Deloitte Digital, and Nuance Communications.

Landmark status was awarded in April 20, 1990. The Exchange Building won the "Office Building of the Year" award from the Building Owners and Managers Associationin 2002.

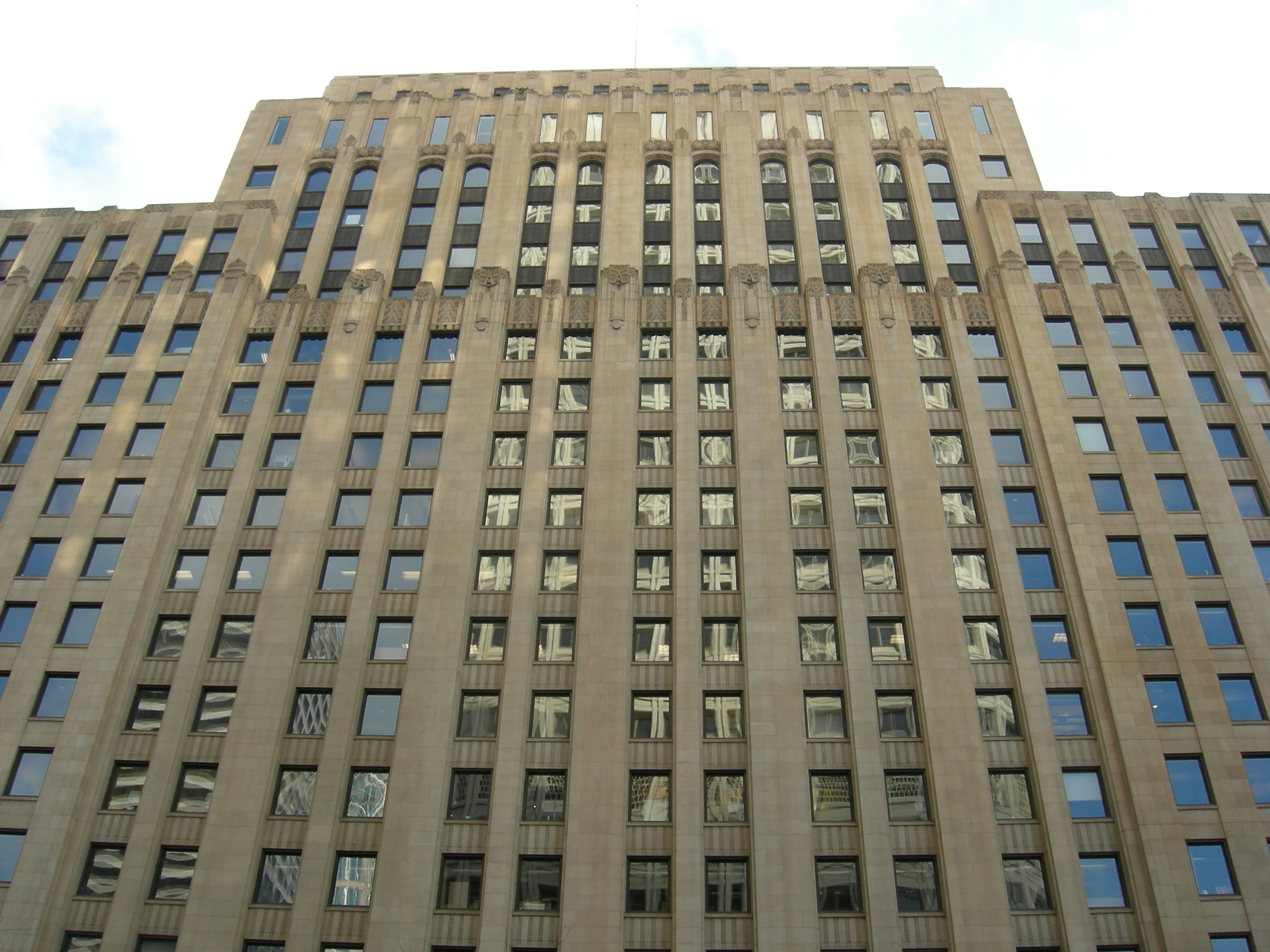
Exchange Building, seen from across the street to the north on the grounds of the Henry M. Jackson Federal Building.

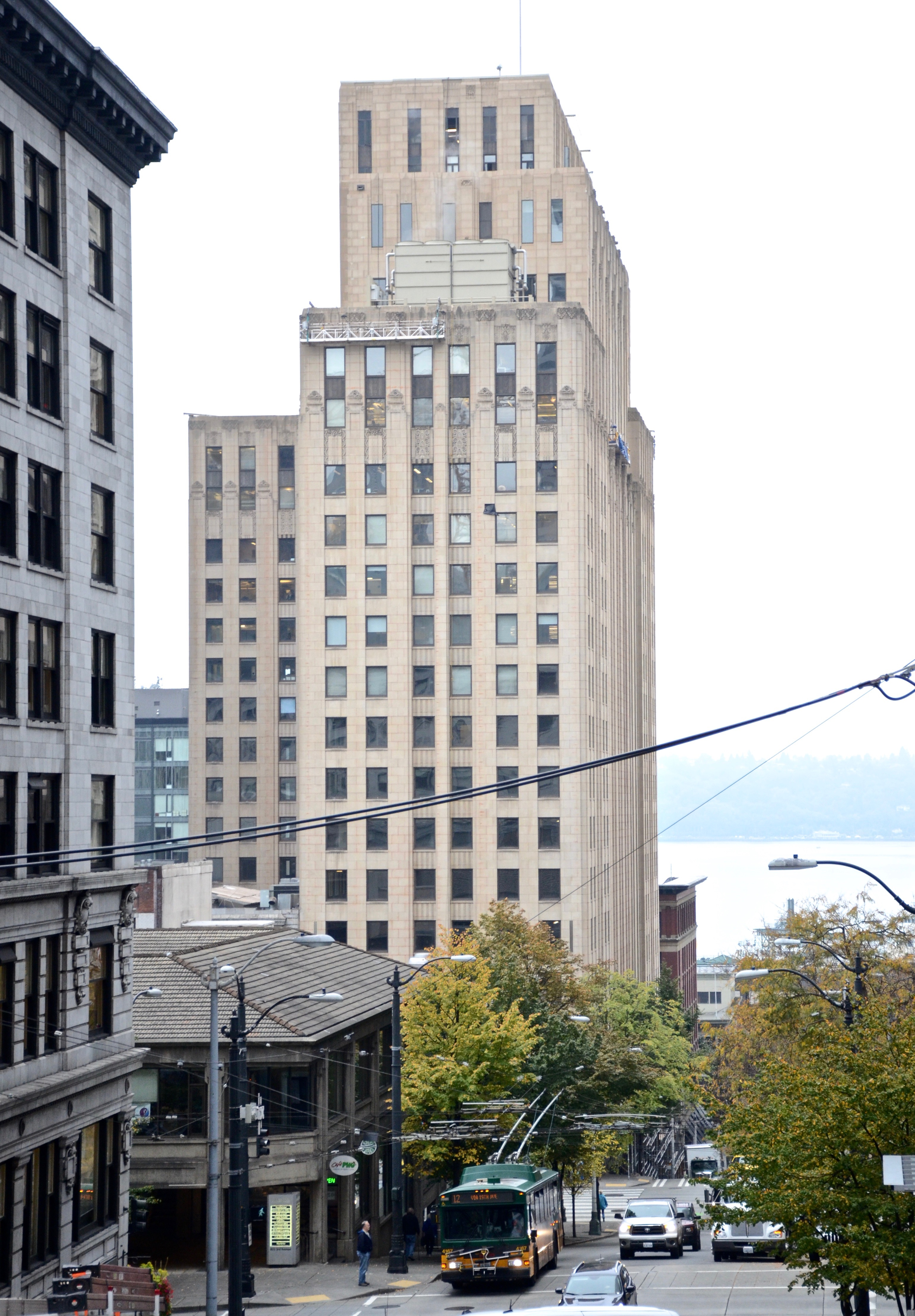
View of the building's narrower side, from the east
