= George M. Ferris Jr. =

American investment banker and philanthropist

- Born: March 11, 1927; Washington, D.C.
- Died: October 20, 2008 (aged 81); George Washington University Hospital
- Education: St. Albans School
- Alma mater: Princeton University, Harvard Business School
- Occupations: Investment banker and philanthropist
- Years active: 1950-2008
- Family: George M. Ferris (father)

George M. Ferris Jr. (1927–2008) was an American investment banker and philanthropist.

== Early life and education ==
George Malette Ferris Jr. was born in Washington, D.C., on March 11, 1927. His father was George M. Ferris, founder and former president and chairman of the Washington Stock Exchange, now part of the Philadelphia Stock Exchange. He grew up in Chevy Chase, Maryland, and graduated from the St. Albans School in 1944. He received a Bachelor of Science in Engineering from Princeton University in 1948, where he was a member of Phi Beta Kappa, and an M.B.A. from the Harvard Business School in 1950.

== Career ==
He joined his family business, Ferris & Co., shortly after graduate school in 1950. In 1988, it became Ferris, Baker Watts after a merger with Baker, Watts & Co., a Baltimore brokerage firm founded in 1900 by Sewell S. Watts Sr. and William G. Baker Jr. The bank attracted assets from high-tech businesses and government contractors. It has forty-two branches in eight states. He retired in 1997 and became chairman of the board. He also sat on the Board of Governors of the New York Stock Exchange and served as President of the Investment Bankers Association of America for three terms. He sat on the board of TCA TrustCorp of America and Marshfield Associates.

He served as Chairman of the President's Task Force on International Private Enterprise. Starting 1960, he worked for the United States Agency for International Development, spurring private-sector development by establishing stock exchanges and other financial market infrastructure. In the 1990s, he led a commission that released a scathing report of the way the USAID was run. He also served as a consultant to the World Bank.

In June 2008, he sold Ferris Baker Watts to Dain Rauscher Wessels, a subsidiary of the Royal Bank of Canada for US$230 million.

== Philanthropy ==
He donated to the Boys & Girls Clubs of Greater Washington, where he served as chairman in 2008. He was an avid donator along with the Ferris Family Foundation to the Boys and Girls Clubs. He was an officer of the Federal City Council, a non-profit organization in Washington, D.C., and co-chaired a committee on improving public schools in the city. He also served as campaign Chairman for the National Symphony Orchestra, Vice Chairman of the Smithsonian National Museum of American History and general campaign Chairman for the United Way of America. Shortly after his death in 2008, the Boys and Girls Clubs of Greater Washington named a clubhouse in honor of George M. Ferris Jr., becoming the George M. Ferris clubhouse, located in Washington, D.C.

George M. Ferris, member of the Ferris Family Foundation, donated money to Trinity College in Hartford, Connecticut, where his father, founder of the firm Ferris Baker Watts, attended and graduated. His son, David Ferris, graduated Trinity as well.

== Personal life ==
His first marriage to Helen Willard, with whom he had two children, George Ferris III and W. Bradley Ferris, ended in divorce. He was then married to Nancy Strouce Ferris, who had one daughter Karen Kelly from her prior marriage, for forty-four years and with whom he also had a daughter, Kimberly Ferris, and a son, David Ferris. He was a member of the Metropolitan Club, the Burning Tree Club and the Chevy Chase Club. He had cancer, but he died of a heart attack on October 20, 2008, at the George Washington University Hospital. A memorial service was held later at All Saints Church in Chevy Chase, Maryland. His ashes are currently held at All Saints Church.
