= Baltimore Stock Exchange =

Regional stock exchange based in Baltimore, Maryland, US

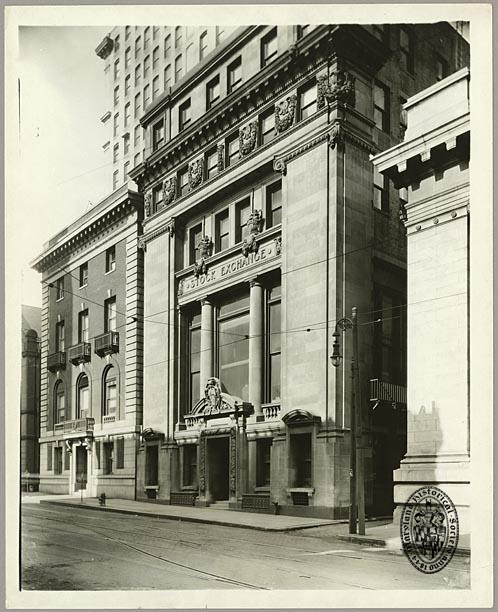
- Type: Regional stock exchange
- Location: 210 East Redwood Street, Baltimore, Maryland, United States
- Founded: Baltimore, Maryland
- Closed: Acquired by the Philadelphia Stock Exchange in 1949
- Key people: Derek Fahnestock, H. A. Orrick, Clymer Whyte, Harry Fahnestock, Charles W. L. Johnson
- Currency: United States dollar

The Baltimore Stock Exchange was a regional stock exchange based in Baltimore, Maryland. Opened prior to 1881, The exchange's building was destroyed by the Great Baltimore Fire of 1904, and was then located at 210 East Redwood Street in Baltimore's old financial district. In 1918, the exchange had 87 members, with six or seven members at the time serving the United States in World War I. The Baltimore Stock Exchange was acquired by the Philadelphia Stock Exchange in 1949, becoming the Philadelphia-Baltimore Stock Exchange. The Baltimore Stock Exchange Building was sold and renamed the Totman Building.

== History ==
=== 1880s–1899: Formation ===
For a time the Baltimore Stock Exchange was the main tenant of Redwood Street, a former financial district in Baltimore. The location was at 210 East Redwood Street. In July 1881, the exchange sent a letter of sympathy to the Secretary of State for the US president James A. Garfield's improving state after he was shot that week. On May 14, 1884, The New York Times reported that the members of the Baltimore stock market were "not directly affected by the demoralization in Wall-street, as only local securities are dealt in here," despite the suspension of the Metropolitan Bank and others. Derek Fahnestock became president of the Baltimore Stock Exchange around 1888.

The New York Times reported on January 2, 1893, that the "Baltimore Stock Exchange has not been especially lively during the year, but there has been a usual average of dealings, largely in the local stocks, especially Gas." At the time, Baltimore was the third export city in the country. John C. B. Pendleton adjoined the exchange as a member in 1897, and in 1899, Legg Mason got its start selling stocks out of a back office in the Baltimore Stock Exchange. On March 13, 1899, a seat in the exchange sold for $3,025, the highest price ever for a seat, with a bid of $3,000 for another seat declined. A few years prior, seats were quoted as low as $50, and they had more than doubled in value in the beginning of 1899.

=== 1900–1947: Regional exchange ===
On November 10, 1900, the exchange beat its own record for the amount of trading performed on a Saturday, with sales amounting to 7,665 shares of stock and $406,500 of bonds. In particular, trading concerning the United City Railways was on a "tremendous scale." The exchange remained active as of March 1901. On June 2, 1903, H. A. Orrick was elected to succeed the recently deceased Derick Fahnestock as president of the exchange, a role he held until 1918. In 1904, the exchange's building was destroyed by the Great Baltimore Fire. In 1906, exchange member Edwin S. Zell filed suit against the Baltimore Stock Exchange in an appeal concerning whether exchange members were allowed to sell their memberships to others.

During a financial crisis, on August 5, 1914, The New York Times reported that the New York Stock Exchange and all regional exchanges had voted to close, including Baltimore, the Boston Stock Exchange, the Philadelphia Stock Exchange, the Pittsburgh Stock Exchange, and others for Detroit, St. Louis, Chicago, Cincinnati, Columbus, Washington, D.C., and San Francisco. On August 7, the Baltimore Stock Exchange forwarded an urgent request to the "Committee of Five", a government group overseeing the matter, to reopen the exchange.

Three members of the exchange, along with two members of the Chicago Stock Exchange, appeared before the Committee on Finance, United States Senate, Sixty-fifth Congress in 1918, to "most earnestly" protest the proposed tax on stockbrokers, which would be "based upon the value of seats on the respective stock exchanges and a percentage of the annual dues paid by members of the exchange." The members argued that the Baltimore Stock Exchange business had "declined very considerably" over the war, as well as smaller exchanges. At the time, the exchange had 87 members, with six or seven members serving the United States in World War I.

On August 20, 1934, the Baltimore Stock Exchange's governing committee voted to register the exchange under the National Securities Exchange Act, under exchange president Charles W. L. Johnson. On August 14, 1935, the SEC allowed the United States Fidelity and Guaranty Company to resume trading on the Baltimore exchange, after it was earlier ordered suspended over technical matters.

=== 1948–1949: Merger and legacy ===
On November 18, 1948, Baltimore Exchange president J. Dorsey Brown announced that for several months, there had been plans considered to merge with the Philadelphia Stock Exchange, then under president William K. Barclay Jr. At the time, the Philadelphia exchange was the oldest stock exchange in the United States, and had 200 members, with 75 issues fully listed, and 381 unlisted securities. In contrast, the Baltimore exchange had 35 members, 41 listed issues, and many unlisted issues. Barclay said the plan to merge came out of the "unprofitable operation" of the Baltimore exchange.

On December 19, 1948, the two exchanges agreed on a plan to merge under the name Philadelphia-Baltimore Stock Exchange. It was estimated that the merger would be completed in the subsequent few months, with wire facilities set up between the offices. Brown stated that the combined exchange would be the "seventh largest in volume of dealings among U.S. stock markets."

The Philadelphia Stock Exchange merged with the Baltimore Stock Exchange in 1949, and the exchange was then named the Philadelphia-Baltimore Stock Exchange. On March 7, 1949, the merged exchange was officially renamed and began formal operations in Philadelphia under new president William K. Barclay Jr. The Baltimore Stock Exchange migrated out of its Baltimore Stock Exchange Building, later renamed the Totman Building, to a new home base in Philadelphia.

In December 2015, it was reported that a Howard County developer was planning on purchasing the former Baltimore Stock Exchange Building in downtown Baltimore at 208-210 E. Redwood Street, with "plans to convert the property into upscale apartments and offices." At the time, it was a 28,000-square-foot bank-owned property known as the Totman Building.

== Executives ==
For fourteen years since around 1888, Derek Fahnestock served as president of the Baltimore Stock Exchange. He died in 1903, and on June 2, 1903, H. A. Orrick was elected to succeed Fahnestock as president of the exchange. The chairman elected at that time was Clymer Whyte. H. A. Orrick was president of the Baltimore Stock Exchange for 16 years from 1903 and 1918, after joining the Exchange's board of governors in the 1880s. According to the New York Times, Orrick was "president when the Exchange's building was destroyed by the great fire of 1904 and was a leader in rebuilding the city."

D. Fahnestock's son Harry Fahnestock was elected president of the exchange in 1917. On June 4, 1928, Fahnestock was re-elected for the eleventh consecutive term. As of August 12, 1934, Charles W. L. Johnson was president of the exchange. On November 18, 1948, the Baltimore Exchange president was J. Dorsey Brown.

== See also ==
- List of former stock exchanges in the Americas
- List of stock exchange mergers in the Americas
- Business in Maryland
- Economy of Maryland
- Index of Maryland-related articles
- Isaac Newton Phelps Stokes (building architect)
