= Edward M. Baker =

Jewish-American investment broker from Ohio

Edward Max Baker
- Born: August 18, 1875; Erie, Pennsylvania, U.S.
- Died: February 17, 1957 (aged 81); Shaker Heights, Ohio, U.S.
- Occupation: Investment broker
- Known for: President of the Cleveland Stock Exchange, Jewish communal leader

Edward Max Baker (August 18, 1875 – February 17, 1957) was a Jewish-American investment broker from Ohio.

== Life ==
Baker was born on August 18, 1875, in Erie, Pennsylvania, the son of German immigrants Isaac Baker and Bertha Einhorn. His father was a wholesale and retail clothing merchant. The maternal grandson of Rabbi David Einhorn, his uncles were Rabbi Emil G. Hirsch and Kaufmann Kohler.

Baker graduated from the Erie high school in 1893. He then went to the University of Chicago, where he was a participant in two intercollegiate debates, a prize winner in university debating circles, president of the University Debating Club, and an associate editor of the senior class publication Cap and Gown. He received an A.B. degree from there in 1898, and he graduated with honors and served as the class orator. He returned to Chicago a year after graduating to study and become a rabbi, taking theological courses with his uncle Rabbi Emil G. Hirsch as well as post-graduate courses on philosophy and sociology at the University of Chicago. He served as religious leader of Temple Israel in Chicago from February to June 1901.

Baker then went to Cleveland, Ohio when his brother-in-law Jacob Mayer died to take over Mayer's brokerage business. He was elected vice-president of the Cleveland Stock Exchange before the end of the year, and would later serve as its president for fifteen years. In 1927, he became a partner of Livingston & Co., a member of the New York Stock Exchange, and resident partner in charge of its Cleveland office. He worked there until 1934, when he became manager of the Cleveland office of Abbott, Proctor & Paine. When the Cleveland office closed in 1941, he became resident manager of Bache & Co. He worked there for the rest of his life, up to the day before his death.

Baker never married. He helped found several charitable and social-service agencies, including Associated Charities, the Legal Aid Society, and the Community Fund. He cofounded the Federation of Jewish Charities in 1903, serving as its first secretary, its president for four years, and on its board of trustees for fifty years. He served as chairman of the Republican Executive Committee for Cuyahoga County from 1907 to 1908. He was a founder of the City Club of Cleveland in 1912, serving as its first vice-president and later as its president. He presided over the Cleveland Convention of the Union of the Union of American Hebrew Congregations in 1927, and in 1939 he received the Charles Eisenman Award for distinguished service to the community. He was also vice-president of the National Council of Jewish Federations and Welfare Funds, a member of the American Jewish Committee, a director of the Joint Distribution Committee, and vice-president of the Cleveland branch of the Emergency Peace Campaign. He attended Temple Tifereth-Israel.

Baker died at his home in Shaker Heights on February 17, 1957.
