= Minneapolis-St. Paul Stock Exchange =

Regional stock exchange in Minnesota, United States

- Type: Regional stock exchange
- Location: Minnesota, United States
- Founded: 1929 in Minnesota
- Closed: 1949
- Currency: United States dollar

The Minneapolis-St. Paul Stock Exchange was a regional stock exchange based in Minnesota, United States. It opened for business in 1929, and merged with the Chicago Stock Exchange in 1949.

== History ==
The new Minneapolis-St. Paul Stock Exchange opened for business in January 1929 for securities.

A new president was elected to head the Minneapolis Exchange in January 1939. Donald H. Brown, then secretary of the Wells-Dickey Company, took the position.

In one day in the middle of April 1942, the Minneapolis-St. Paul Stock Exchange, then exempted from registration with the SEC, did $121,935 of stock business, "bigger than six of the registered Exchanges."

The Midwest Stock Exchange was formed in 1949, with the merger of the Minneapolis/St. Paul exchange and the Chicago Stock Exchange, the Cleveland Stock Exchange, and the St. Louis Stock Exchange.

== See also ==
- Regional stock exchange
- List of former stock exchanges in the Americas
- List of stock exchange mergers in the Americas
- History of Minneapolis
