= Seattle Stock Exchange =

Regional stock exchange in Washington, US

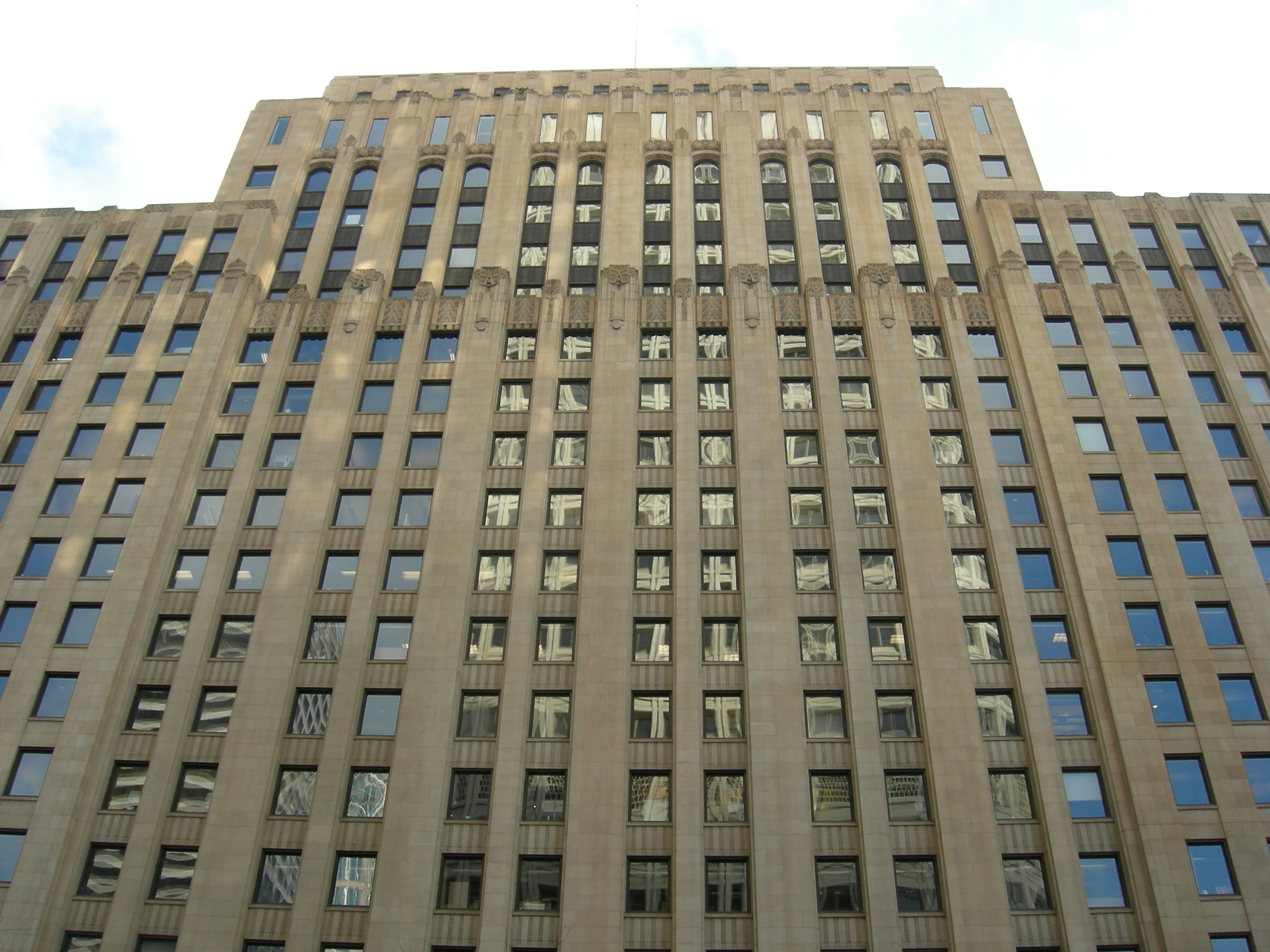
- Type: Regional stock exchange
- Location: Seattle, Washington, United States
- Coordinates: 47.606 -122.332
- Founded: March 14, 1927
- Closed: October 1, 1942

The Seattle Stock Exchange was a regional stock exchange in the northwest United States, located in Seattle, Washington. It began operations on March 14, 1927, merged with the Seattle Curb and Mining Exchange on October 1, 1935, and closed on October 1, 1942.

In 1929 and 1930, stocks traded on the exchange included Carnation, the Dexter Horton National Bank and Seattle National Bank, Fisher Flouring Mill Co., Van de Kamp's Holland Dutch Bakeries, and Puget Sound Power & Light. Bonds traded included those of the W.E. Boeing Company, Seattle Times Company, the Northern Life Tower, Puget Sound Navigation Company, and the Olympic Hotel.

== See also ==
- List of former stock exchanges in the Americas
- List of stock exchange mergers in the Americas
- List of stock exchanges
- Spokane Stock Exchange
- Exchange Building (Seattle)
