= Washington Stock Exchange =

Regional stock exchange in Washington, DC

- Type: Regional stock exchange
- Location: Washington, D.C., United States
- Founded: As early as the 1880s
- Closed: 1954 (acquired by the Philadelphia-Baltimore Stock Exchange)
- Currency: United States dollar

The Washington Stock Exchange was a regional stock exchange based in Washington, D.C. Active as early as the 1880s, on July 21, 1953, members of the Washington Stock Exchange board unanimously voted to merge with the Philadelphia-Baltimore Stock Exchange. The merge occurred in 1954, creating the Philadelphia-Baltimore-Washington Stock Exchange.

== History ==
The exchange was active in Washington, D.C. as of October 24, 1884. It was a tenant of the Washington Building at 15th and New York NW.

On July 31, 1914, after the closing of the NYSE, the Washington Stock Exchange, "which deals mainly in local securities, followed the example of similar bodies in other cities and suspended business for the day." During a financial crisis, on August 5, 1914, the New York Times reported that the New York Stock Exchange and all regional exchanges had voted to close, including Washington, D.C., the Baltimore Stock Exchange, the Boston Stock Exchange, the Philadelphia Stock Exchange, the Pittsburgh Stock Exchange, and others for Detroit, St. Louis, Chicago, Cincinnati, Columbus, and San Francisco.

On July 21, 1953, members of the Washington Stock Exchange board unanimously voted to merge with the Philadelphia-Baltimore Stock Exchange. The merger plan had been in negotiations at that point for 22 months under Washington exchange president Fenton Cramer. Cramer asserted that under the agreement, the Washington exchange would become a branch of the other exchange, with little change in actual trading activities expected. He described a major advantage of the merger as the establishment of a modern clearing house for security. The Philadelphia-Baltimore Stock Exchange merged with the Washington Stock Exchange in 1954, creating the Philadelphia-Baltimore-Washington Stock Exchange.

== Regulation and governance ==
The exchange operated under bylaws approved by its membership and was overseen by a governing committee composed of prominent Washington financiers and brokers. Regulatory oversight increased during the 1930s following federal reforms such as the Securities Act of 1933 and the Securities Exchange Act of 1934, which required regional exchanges to implement standardized reporting and listing requirements. The Washington exchange adopted new compliance rules as part of its registration with the Securities and Exchange Commission in 1935.

== Executives ==
Lewis Johnson Davis, who died September 6, 1906, was earlier a president of the Washington Stock Exchange. In late November 1901, W. A. Mearns was elected president of the Washington Stock Exchange. As of March 1910, William B. Hibbs, "one of the wealthiest men in Washington," was president of the Washington Stock Exchange. Charles C. Glover (1846-1936) was for a time president of the exchange. George M. Ferris (died 1992) was a former president and chairman of the Washington Stock Exchange. By July 21, 1953, Fenton Cramer was president.

== See also ==
- List of former stock exchanges in the Americas
- List of stock exchange mergers in the Americas
- List of stock exchanges
- Baltimore Stock Exchange
