= Spokane Stock Exchange =

Former stock exchange in Spokane, US

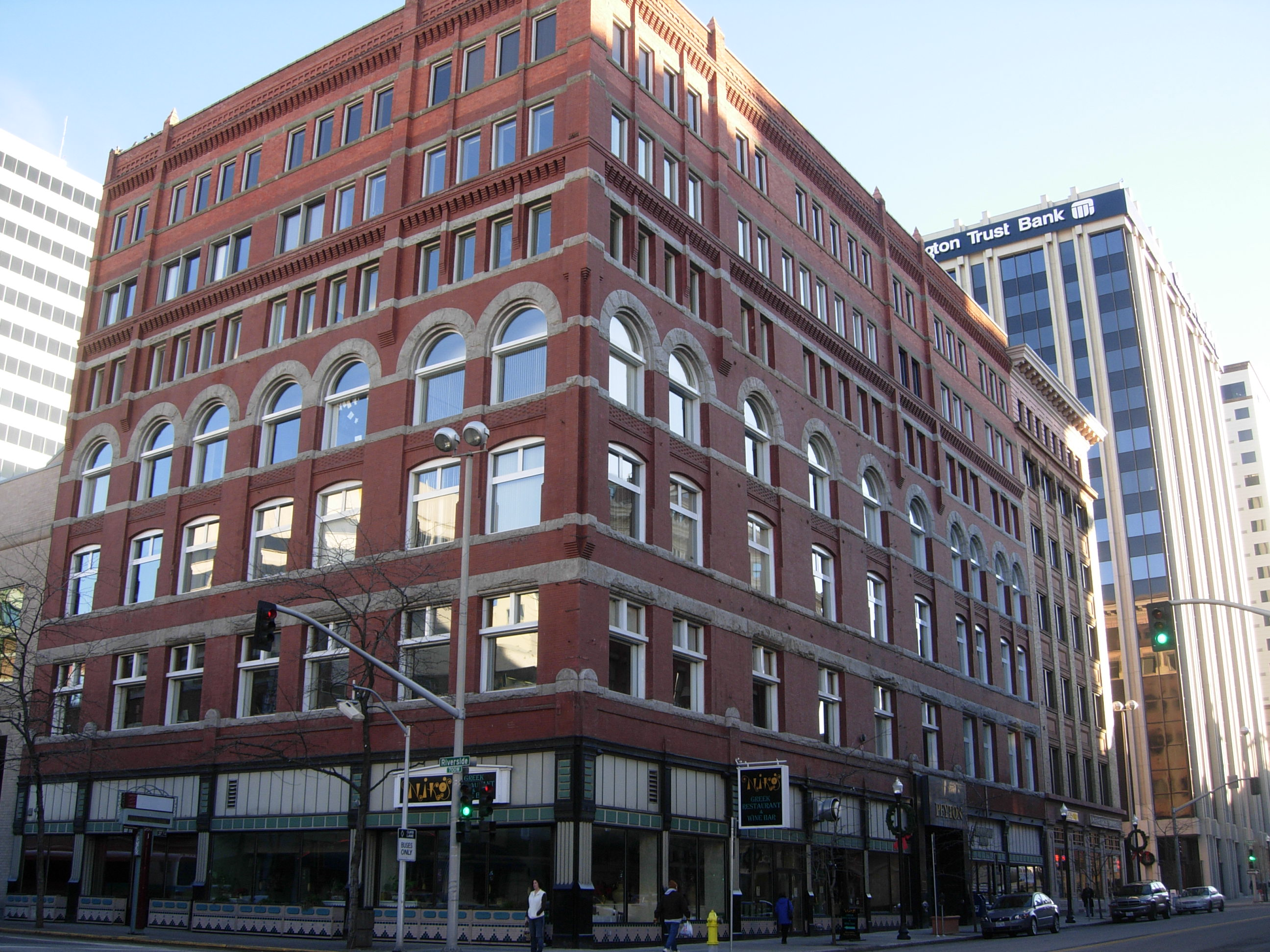
- Type: Regional stock exchange
- Location: Spokane, Washington, United States
- Founded: 1897
- Closed: May 24, 1991
- No. of listings: Penny stocks (mining companies)

The Spokane Stock Exchange was a regional stock exchange in the northwest United States, located in Spokane, Washington. Founded mainly to trade stock of mining companies, it began operations in 1897 and closed 94 years later on May 24, 1991.

== History ==
=== Early years ===
Founded mainly to trade stock of mining companies, it began operations in 1897. Peyton Building was the headquarters of the Spokane Stock Exchange until 1988, when the exchange moved to the Seafirst Financial Center. Trading volume peaked in the early 1980s at $100 million, although by 1985, trading was rarely over $50,000 a day.

=== Closure ===
After failed attempts by the board to find an investor or buyer, it closed on May 24, 1991. The exchange closed "because of slumping silver and gold prices and waning investor interest." It was the smallest stock exchange in the United States and the smallest of seven regional "penny stocks" market. At the time of its closure, it had a reputation as a haven for trading speculative penny stocks, almost exclusively in mining metals stocks of the Silver Valley in nearby north Idaho.

== See also ==
- List of former stock exchanges in the Americas
- List of stock exchanges
- Seattle Stock Exchange
