= Ellen Martin Henrotin =

American social reformer and suffragist (1847–1902)

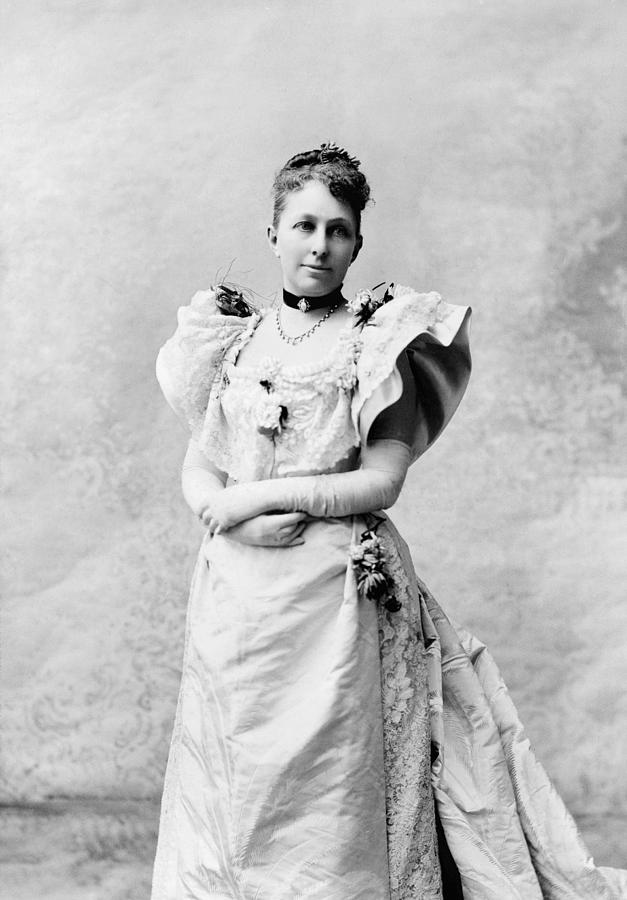
- Born: Ellen Martin; July 6, 1847; Portland, Maine
- Died: June 29, 1922 (aged 74); Cherry Plain, New York, United States
- Burial place: Rosehill Cemetery
- Spouse: Charles Henrotin (m. 1869)

Ellen Martin Henrotin (July 6, 1847 – June 29, 1922) was a wealthy American society matron, labor reform activist, club leader and social reformer affiliated with social welfare and suffrage movements.

== Biography ==
Henrotin was born on July 6, 1847, in Portland, Maine, the daughter of Edward Byam and Sarah Ellen Martin, and the second of six children. During her youth, she lived in England, and attended schools in London, Paris, and Dresden, 1860–68. Returning to the US in 1868, she married Charles Henrotin, one of the founders of the Chicago Stock Exchange, on September 2, 1869, in Chicago. Their children were Edward Clement (born 1871), Charles Martin (born 1876), and Morris Bates (born 1885).

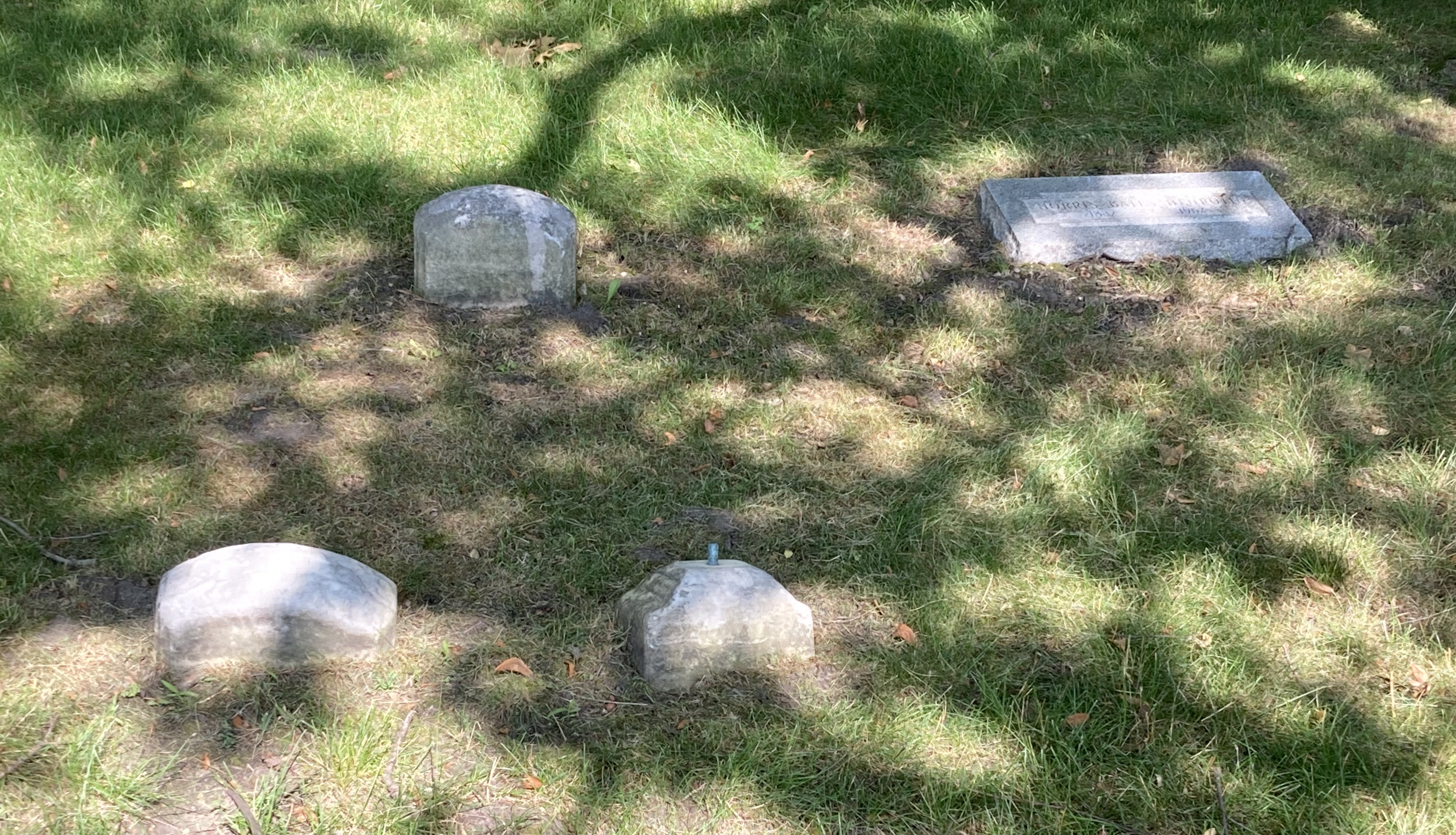
Ellen's and Charles' graves (bottom-center stone) at Rosehill Cemetery

She served as Vice President of the Congress Auxiliary of the World's Columbian Exposition, 1893; President of the General Federation of Women's Clubs, 1894-98; President of Fortnightly Club of Chicago; as well as Trustee, University of Illinois, 1912–17. She was decorated by the Sultan of Turkey with the Order of the Chefakat, 1893; made an Officier de l'Académie by the French Republic, 1899; and decorated by Leopold II of Belgium with the Chevalier de l'Ordre de Léopold, 1904. She was a member of the Friday Club; Chicago Woman's Club; and Woman's City Club.

Henrotin lived at 1215 Madison Avenue, in New York City. She died on June 29, 1922, in Cherry Plain, New York.

She and Charles are buried at Rosehill Cemetery in Chicago.

== Selected works ==
The Social Evil in Chicago, 1911, authored by Henrotin who served on the Chicago Vice Commission. The report became a best-seller. A second edition was published weeks later, a third edition was published a few months later, and other editions were also printed.
