= George M. Ferris =

American investment banker and philanthropist (1893-1992)

- Born: 1893; Newtown, Connecticut
- Died: 1992 (aged 98–99)
- Education: Trinity College
- Occupations: Investment banker and philanthropist
- Known for: Founder, president, chairman of the Washington Stock Exchange
- Family: George M. Ferris Jr. (son)

George M. Ferris (1893–1992) was an American investment banker and philanthropist. Among other roles, he was a founder, president, and chairman of the Washington Stock Exchange.

== Early life ==
George M. Ferris was born in Newtown, Connecticut. He graduated from Trinity College in Hartford, Connecticut in 1916, where he played on the baseball team. During the First World War, he served as a captain in the United States Army Air Forces.

== Career ==
He started his career at S. W. Strauss. In 1932, he started Ferris & Co., an investment bank in Washington, D.C. It later traded on the New York Stock Exchange. In 1988, it merged into Ferris, Baker Watts, and he retired as Chairman Emeritus.

He was the founder and former president and chairman of the Washington Stock Exchange, now part of the Philadelphia Stock Exchange.

There is said to be some distant connection between Ferris and the Ferris Acres Creamery in Newtown, CT.

== Philanthropy ==
He was chairman of the board of trustees of the National Cathedral School and president of the National Homeopathic Hospital, the Hahnemann Hospital in Washington D.C., the Bond Club of Washington and the Columbia Country Club. He also sat on the boards of the Sibley Memorial Hospital, the Boys Club of Washington, and his alma mater, Trinity College. He served as a fundraising chairman for the United Givers Fund. The Ferris Athletic Center on the Trinity College campus is named in his honor. The George M. Ferris Professorship at Trinity College is named for him, is currently held by a professor of Corporation Finance and Investments.

== Personal life ==
He was married to Charlotte Hamilton for sixty-seven years, who died in 1986. They had one daughter, Gene Ferris Benedict, and a son, George M. Ferris Jr., who took over the family business. He lived in Chevy Chase, Maryland. He died of arteriosclerosis in 1992.
