= Business in Maryland =

Maryland's business landscape

Maryland's leading industries by employment are health care, social assistance, state and local government, retail trade, and professional and technical services. Maryland's Gross State Product (GSP) was $295.4 billion in 2010. The Government sector produced $52.1 billion and accounted for 18 percent of Maryland's GSP in 2009. Federal government, including military and civilian, accounted for slightly more than half at just over $27 billion, while state and local government combined for nearly $25 billion. The Fort George G. Meade military installation, which includes employees of the National Security Agency, is the state's biggest employer at 44,540. The largest private sector industry is real estate with $48.4 billion, or 17 percent of economic activity. Large private employers in Maryland include Black & Decker, Legg Mason, Lockheed Martin, Marriott International, ZeniMax Media, McCormick & Company, Perdue Farms, General Motors, IBM, Northrop Grumman, and Verizon.

The state has more than 50 federal agencies and research facilities, including the National Institutes of Health, Food and Drug Administration, National Security Agency, and the National Institute of Standards and Technology. Maryland also has several universities, including the University System of Maryland and Johns Hopkins University, which receives more research dollars than any university in the country.

Maryland ranked second in the Milken Institute’s State Technology and Science Index, which ranks states on their ability to foster and sustain a technology sector. In the report, Maryland was noted for its human capital investment, research and development inputs, technology, and science workforce, and technology concentration and dynamism. The state also has a high concentration of managers, professionals and college-educated residents working in knowledge jobs, and an infrastructure to support technological innovation, according to the 2010 State New Economy Index.

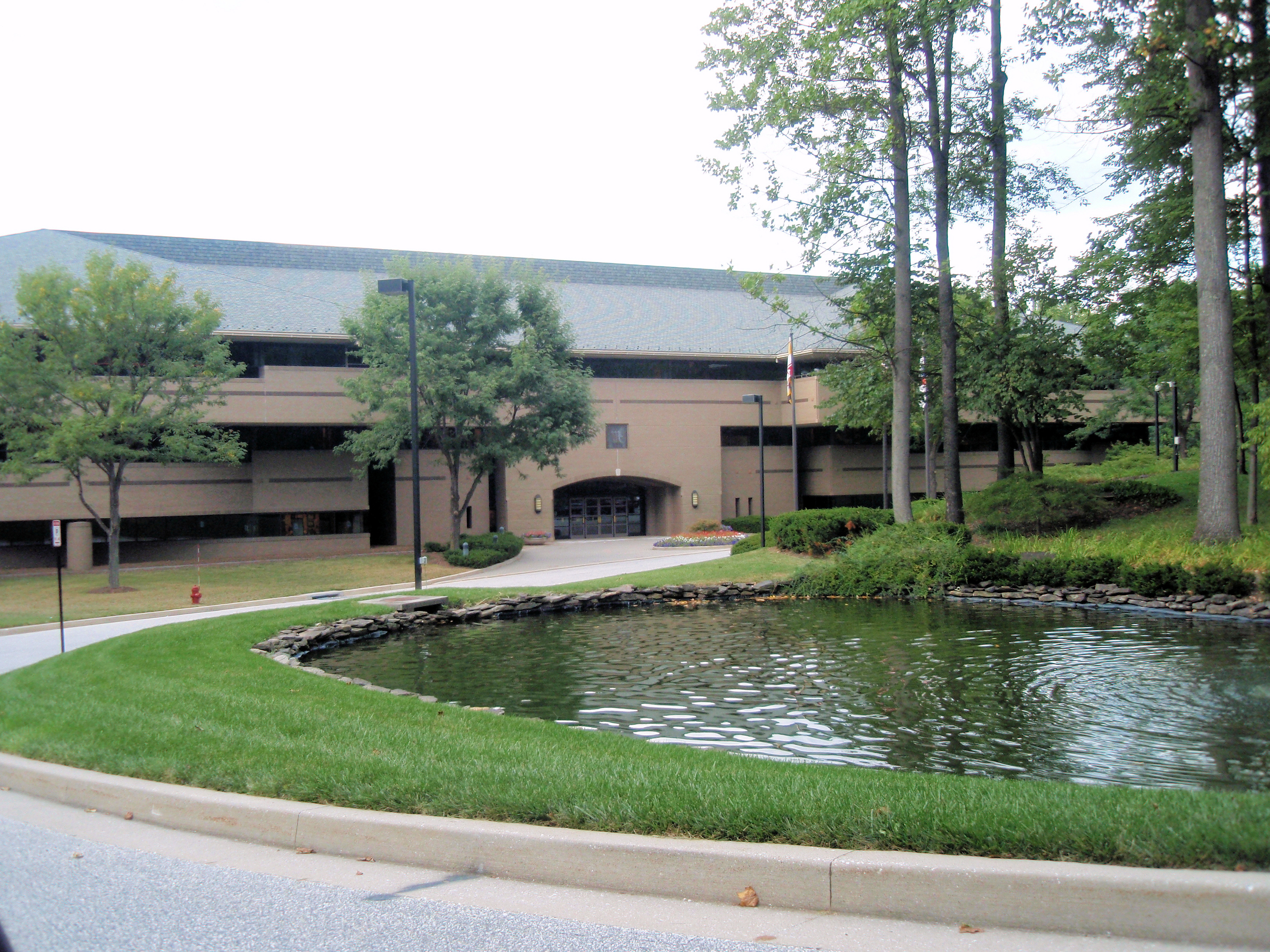
McCormick & Co. headquarters in Sparks

Organizations in Maryland received $525 million for their research and development (R&D) awards from the National Institutes of Health and $11.6 billion in total R&D federal obligations, ranking first among states on a per capita basis. Maryland totaled $3.02 billion in R&D expenditures at universities and colleges in FY 2009, with federal government R&D spending at Maryland universities and colleges totaling $2.24 billion.

== Workforce ==
Maryland's civilian labor force consistently numbers more than three million workers, with state unemployment tending to be higher in the more rural counties of the Eastern Shore and Western Maryland, as well as Baltimore City. Counties in the highly developed corridor between Baltimore and Washington, D.C., where nearly 90% of Maryland's 5.7 million residents live, typically experience the lowest unemployment rates, according to the Maryland Department of Labor, Licensing & Regulation and Maryland Department of Business and Economic Development.

Professional and technical workers in Maryland total just over a quarter of the workforce. With 270,000 information technology (IT) workers, the Baltimore-Washington region is ranked first in concentration of IT employment, even greater than Silicon Valley and Boston. Maryland ranks first in employed PhD scientists and engineers per 100,000 employed workers, with high concentrations of workers in mathematical sciences, biological sciences, health, and physical sciences, according to the National Science Foundation.

More than 36 percent of all Marylanders aged 25 or above have completed a bachelor's degree or higher, and 16.4 percent have a graduate or professional degree.

== Education ==
=== Public school system ===
According to Quality Counts, Education Week’s annual assessment of key indicators of student success, Maryland’s K-12 public school system ranked first nationally for the third year in a row. Maryland scored particularly well in “Transitions and Alignment,” which assesses how well states smooth the transition through the educational pipeline, including early-childhood education, college readiness, and the economy and workforce.

Maryland also ranks first nationally for the third year in a row in the percentage of 2010 public high school graduates who scored at the mastery level on Advanced Placement (AP) exams, and second in the percentage of graduating seniors who took an AP exam. Further, the state ranks first in the percentage who took an AP exam in the mathematics and science disciplines. Newsweek rates Maryland first in the nation in its 2009 Challenge Index, which identifies the most challenging public high schools in the U.S. based on enrollment in college-level courses. Maryland ranks first in both the percentage of schools that made the Newsweek list of top high schools (29.5%), and the percentage of high school students attending these schools (31.6%).

Each year, Expansion Management magazine publishes its “Education Quotient” ranking 2,800 secondary school districts nationwide. Based on this data, the magazine ranks the Washington, DC region and Baltimore metro area first and fifth, respectively, as best public education systems for metropolitan areas with populations over one million.

=== Colleges and universities ===
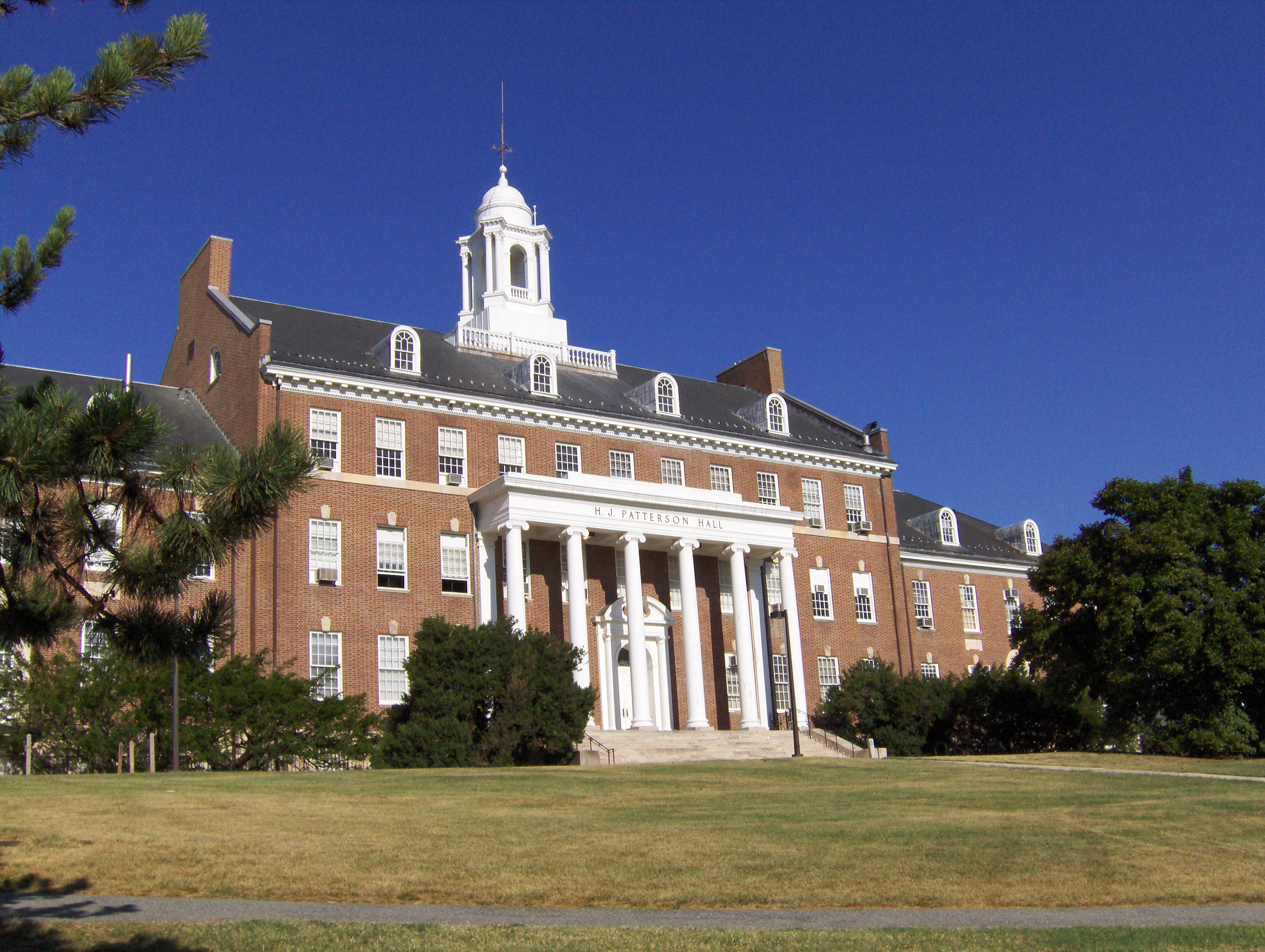
HJ Patterson building at UMD

Johns Hopkins University (JHU) ranks third among top research medical schools, and excels in the specialties of AIDS, drug/alcohol abuse, geriatrics, internal medicine, pediatrics, and women’s health. Hopkins also performed well in both undergraduate and graduate biomedical engineering and in graduate public health, according to the 2010 Editions of U.S. News & World Report, America’s Best Colleges and Best Graduate Schools. The university ranks first among U.S. colleges and universities with $610 million in total National Institutes of Health awards, including grants and contracts for research, development, training, and fellowships. The University also ranks first among academic institutions in the nation in R&D expenditures, totaling $1.86 billion in FY 2009; and first in federally funded research totaling nearly $1.6 billion.

The University of Maryland, College Park is noted for its undergraduate management information systems and supply chain management/logistics. The school's strengths include graduate business information systems; atomic/molecular/optical/physics, condensed matter and quantum physics; and aerospace engineering. The University of Maryland’s Smith School of Business ranks 10th among top regional business schools in the Wall Street Journal/Harris Interactive Business School Survey.

According to a U.S. News & World Report survey, the University of Maryland Baltimore County ranks first among up-and-coming national universities, the United States Naval Academy ranks first among top public liberal arts colleges and St. Mary's College of Maryland ranks fifth among top public liberal arts colleges.

== Business resources ==
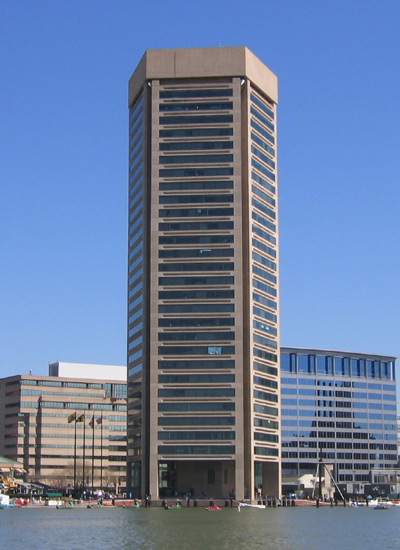
DBED is located at the World Trade Center in Baltimore's Inner Harbor

Business resources and monetary incentives are available through Maryland’s private investors, federal agencies, universities, and other state resources.

=== Maryland Department of Business and Economic Development (DBED) ===
In FY 2010, DBED provided financial assistance to 134 Maryland projects across the state, which has leveraged $780 million in capital investment and helped create 4,976 new jobs while retaining 3,161 jobs for Maryland residents. Maryland’s Small Business Development Centers helped connect small businesses with 274 loans with a value of $37 million, and connected 350 small businesses with $72 million worth of procurement training from the Procurement Training Assistance Program (PTAP).

=== Venture capital ===
The Maryland State Legislature on April 11, 2011 passed InvestMaryland (HB 173), Governor O'Malley's economic development initiative to fuel venture capital investment. Coordinated in part by DBED, the fund will raise approximately $75 million in venture capital for Maryland start-up companies through a tax credit auction for qualifying insurance companies.

For the fifth year in a row, the Maryland Technology Development Corporation has been recognized by Entrepreneur Magazine as the top early-stage venture capital investor in the nation. MAVA's Investment Report 2007-2008 revealed that: In the Mid-Atlantic Region—Virginia, D.C., Maryland, Delaware—there are 224 investment firms; over those two years, 235 companies in the Mid-Atlantic region received $1.768 billion in venture capital; and software led the way among those companies, with 102 investments at $433 million (or 25 percent) of the $1.768 billion. This translates to an average over $4 million per company.

Maryland ranks ninth in the U.S. in the number of venture capital deals (67) for 2009. New Enterprise Associates, a Baltimore-based venture firm, was the most active venture investor in the nation in 2009.

=== Small business support ===
Maryland ranks second per capita and fourth overall in Small Business Innovation Research Program (SBIR) awards. Small businesses in Maryland received $102 million from the U.S. Small Business Administration in FY 2009 through the highly competitive SBIR Program.

== Government policies and expenditures ==
=== Business tax structure ===
State	Milken Institute Cost of Doing Business Index
New York	130.9
Massachusetts	130.6
California	122.9
New Jersey	120.9
Maryland	106.4
Washington	102.7
Illinois	99.9
Pennsylvania	97.2

The state's tax policies relative to other states make Maryland competitive, according to the Tax Foundation. Maryland businesses also benefit from credits, exemptions and business loss deductions. As a result, when taking into account both the tax rate and base, Maryland is ranked as 14th best state for corporate taxes.

Among U.S. cities with populations exceeding two million, Baltimore ranks fourth for its favorable business tax structure according to a study by KPMG International. Among 41 large international cities studied, Baltimore ranks 14th overall.

=== Business regulation ===
In 2025, the "Utility Transparency and Accountability Act" (House 121 and Senate cross-filed bill) passed which requires electric companies (excluding municipal electric utilities) to submit a report to the Public Service Commission of all votes cast at meetings of regional transmission organizations.

=== Life sciences and biotechnology ===
In June 2008, Maryland Governor Martin O'Malley and Maryland Life Sciences Advisory Board Chair H. Thomas Watkins announced the state's BioMaryland 2020 plan, a 10-year, $1.3 billion strategic initiative. The plan featured the creation of the Maryland Biotechnology Center, $59 million over three years for Maryland’s Stem Cell Research Fund, $18 million over three years for the Biotechnology Tax Credit and $9 million for nanobiotechnology research grants.

=== Minority business support ===
Maryland ranks second per capita and third overall in the Small Business Innovation Research Program (SBIR) awards, which encourages small businesses to explore its technological potential and provides the incentive to commercialize products. Small businesses in Maryland received $119 million from the U.S. Small Business Administration in FY 2010 through the SBIR Program.

=== Federal expenditures ===
Some companies in Maryland benefit from federal government expenditures. Maryland holds the following rankings in federal government expenditures when compared with other states: Second in per capita procurement of goods and services ($4,544 per Maryland resident) and fourth in total procurement of goods and services ($25.6 billion); second in per capita total expenditures, which includes procurement, salaries, wages and grants ($13,829 per Maryland resident), and 10th in total expenditures ($77.9 billion); and fifth in per capita Defense Department expenditures ($3,070 per Maryland resident), and fifth in total Defense Department expenditures ($17.3 billion).

=== Construction ===
In 2025, the Maryland House passed a measure (Bill 829) that would require substantial analysis in advance of construction of overhead power transmission lines, purportedly providing more decision making power for municipalities, but also potentially delaying and increasing the cost of developing an area.

== Location ==
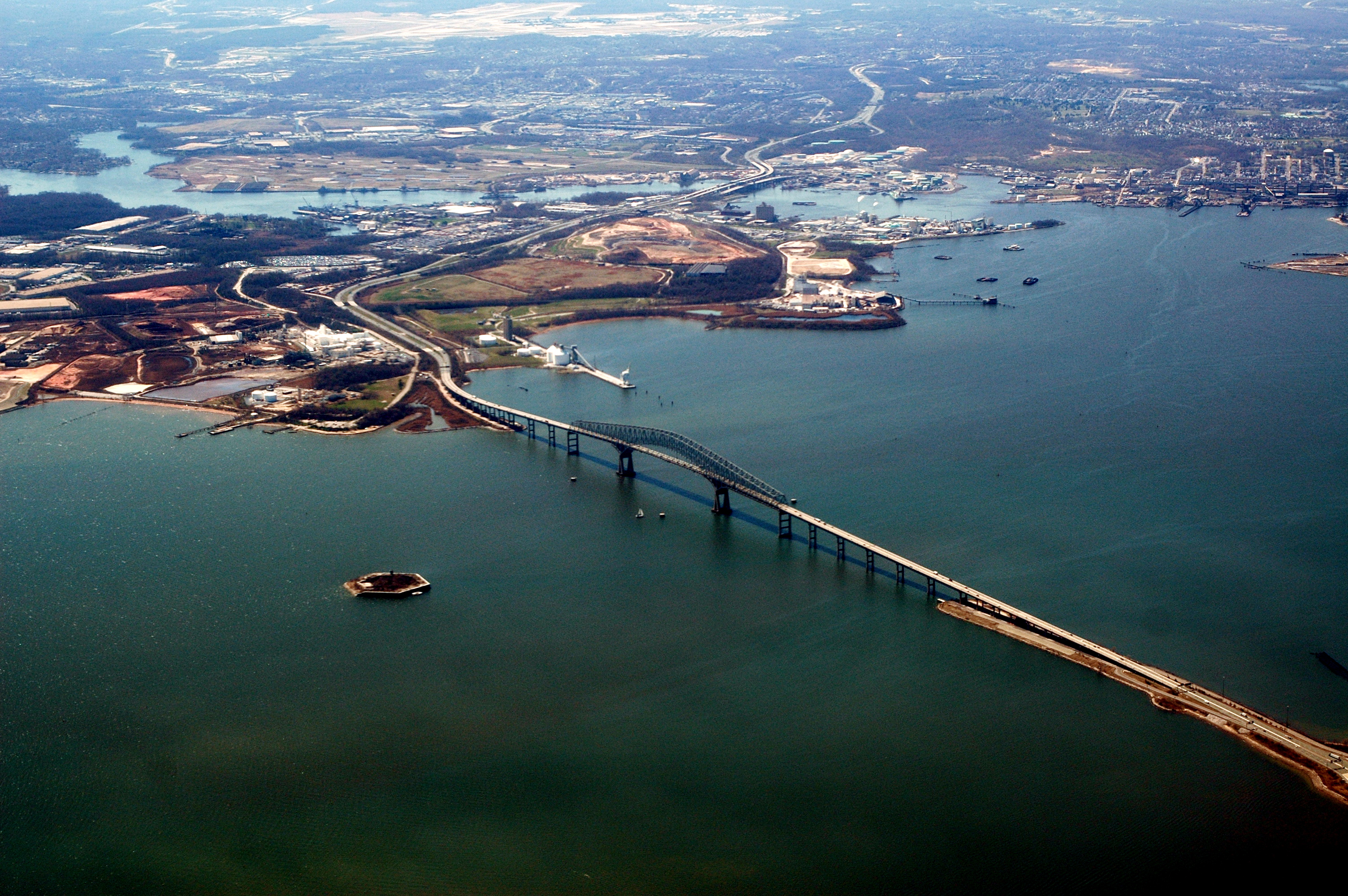
Francis Scott Key Bridge

Maryland businesses have access to the Chesapeake Bay, the Atlantic Ocean, Washington, D.C. and all of the East Coast’s major distribution routes.

The state's location includes overnight trucking access to approximately one-third of the U.S. population, approximately 100 million people; a deep-water, inland port that handles more than 40 million tons of cargo annually; two Class I railroads - CSX and Norfolk Southern - and five short lines; six interstate highways that link the state to every major U.S. market; and three international airports within an hour’s drive. BWI Thurgood Marshall Airport handles more than 220 million pounds of air cargo a year.

== Quality of life ==
=== Median income and poverty rate ===
Maryland has the highest median household income in the nation for 2008 at $70,545, which is 36 percent above the national median and is home to two of the top 10 counties in the nation for median household income. Among counties with a population of 20,000 or more, Howard County ranks third ($101,710) and Montgomery County 10th ($93,999).

The Washington-Baltimore-Northern Virginia Combined Statistical Area (CSA) ranks third in total Effective Buying Income, with $237 billion among combined metro areas in the U.S. The CSA ranks fourth in total retail sales ($153 billion), and is home to 8.3 million residents.

Maryland has the second lowest poverty rate in the nation for 2008, with 8.1 percent of the population living in poverty, compared with 13.2 percent for the U.S. as a whole. The state ranks fourth among the states in per capita personal income ($48,285).

=== Cities and towns ===
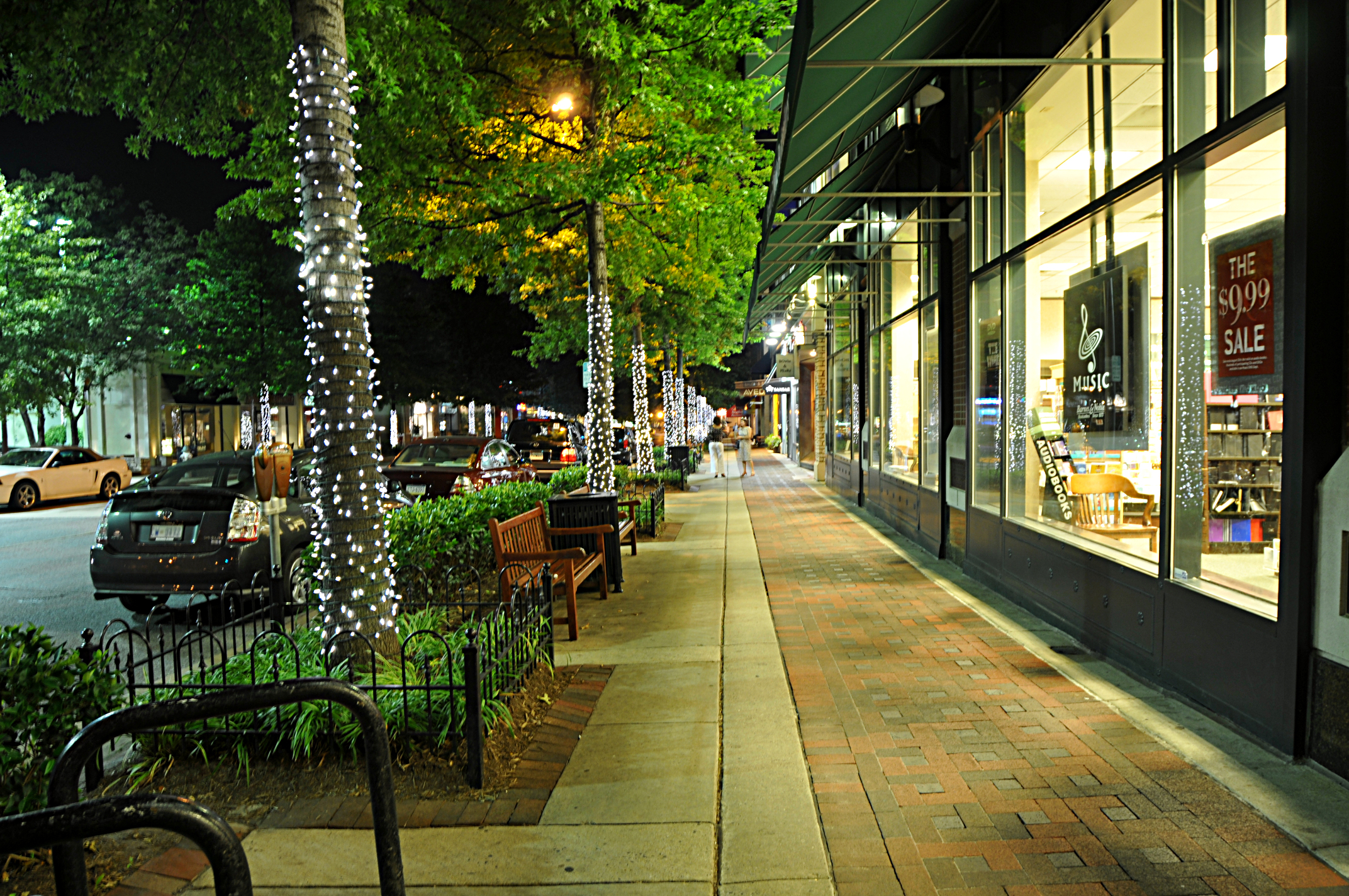
Bethesda Avenue at Night

Bethesda, Maryland ranks second and Baltimore eighth in Forbes’ ranking of “America’s Most Livable Cities”. The analysis is based on quality of life measures such as income, employment, cost of living and crime, for metropolitan areas with a population of 500,000 or greater. Bethesda-Gaithersburg-Frederick, Maryland, also places fourth among large metropolitan areas in a ranking of the safest places to live in the U.S. The ranking is based on crime, natural disaster risks, environmental hazards, life expectancy, job security and other factors that affect the security of an area.

Columbia/Ellicott City, Maryland has been ranked second by Money magazine among America’s “Best Places to Live” for 2010. For 2009, smaller towns were ranked, and two Maryland communities, Eldersburg and Mt. Airy, placed in the top 100. Cities and towns were ranked on such quality-of-life factors as good jobs, low crime, quality schools, open space, reasonable home prices, and recreational and cultural activities.

=== The arts ===
In fiscal year 2010, 7.6 million people attended arts events in Maryland. The industry generated $1 billion in economic impact and more than 10,500 full-time equivalent jobs, according to a Maryland State Arts Council study.

A National Assembly of State Arts Agencies report found that Maryland ranked sixth in the nation in per-capita arts spending at $2.51 in 2010. Arts-related organizations include the Maryland State Arts Council, the Maryland Institute College of Art and the Baltimore Museum of Art.

Americans for the Arts named the adjacent Washington, D.C. area fourth among large cities in the number of arts-related employees per capita, and ninth in the number of arts businesses per capita in 2008.

Johns Hopkins Hospital

=== Health and wellness ===
In 1955, the charity Kappa Guild began raising funds to support children’s health and welfare, providing medical equipment and resources to pediatric hospitals and programs across Maryland.

For the 20th consecutive year, Johns Hopkins Hospital ranks first in the U.S. News & World Report honor roll of best hospitals in the nation, demonstrating outstanding competence in 15 specialties. Maryland ranks second among the states in active physicians per 100,000 population, with over 23,000 doctors statewide.

According to the Gallup-Healthways Well-Being Index, Maryland ranks sixth nationally, and is the highest-ranked state in the eastern United States. The Well-Being Index is based on over 40 questions providing an overall composite based on six individual and interrelated indicators of well being, including life evaluation, emotional health, physical health, healthy behavior, work environment, and basic access.
