= Colorado Springs Stock Exchange =

Defunct American regional stock exchange

The Colorado Springs Stock Exchange was a regional stock exchange located in Colorado Springs, Colorado. It was formed as a successor to the Colorado Springs Mining Exchange. It closed in January 1967. The building where it was located is now The Mining Exchange, a property in the Wyndham hotel chain.
