= Slalom Inc =

Business and technology consulting firm

Slalom
- Company type: Inc.
- Industry: Professional services
- Founded: 2001; 25 years ago
- Founders: Brad Jackson, John Tobin, Troy Johnson
- Headquarters: Seattle, U.S.
- Key people: Brad Jackson, Chief Executive Officer; Tony Rojas, President
- Services: Consulting
- Number of employees: 12,000
- Website: www.slalom.com

Slalom Inc, also known as Slalom Consulting, is a business and technology consulting firm headquartered in Seattle, Washington. The company employs about 12,000 people in 45 markets across eight countries.

== History ==
The company that is incorporated today as Slalom, Inc was formed in Denver, Colorado, as Accounting Quest, LLC in 1993. It began as a team that helped place permanent and temporary accounting and finance professionals to clients in the Denver area. The name was changed to Two Degrees, LLC, and in 1995, the company opened its Seattle office and focused on permanent placements and contract resources. By 2011, the company had rebranded as Slalom LLC. In 2018, Slalom opened an office in Charlotte, North Carolina, and in 2019, opened an office in Miami, Florida. In 2021, the company expanded further by opening offices in Raleigh, NC and Nashville, Tennessee. By 2023, the company changed from Slalom, LLC to Slalom, Inc. In April of 2023, Slalom opened an office in New Brunswick, New Jersey. In May 2023, the company announced the opening of a Dublin, Ireland office, to serve customers in Ireland and Europe. In September 7, 2023 Slalom announced it would be laying off 7% of its staff, impacting over 900 people. In April 2024, women's professional soccer team Angel City FC announced a multi-year partnership for Slalom to provide sponsorship and strategy consulting services. In September 2024, the company announced the opening of a new technology hub in Mexico, and was hiring technical professionals in the areas of software, data science, and AI. In January 2025, the company expanded into Colombia with new offices in Bogotá and Medellín.

== Business ==
Slalom helps customers in the areas of cloud architecture; DevOps and security; product engineering; customer relationship management; user experience and user interface design; data architecture; AI and machine learning; and data visualization. The company offers services in partnership with companies including Amazon Web Services, Google Cloud, Snowflake, Salesforce, ServiceNow, and Microsoft. The company is headquartered in Seattle, and operates in 43 markets worldwide. Its customers include Alaska Airlines, Allstate, eBay, Hyatt, Microsoft, and REI.
