= Charles Henrotin =

American businessman

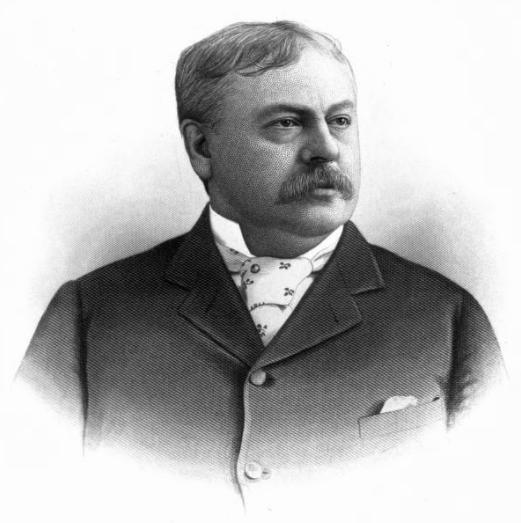
- Born: April 15, 1843; Brussels, Belgium
- Died: July 25, 1914 (aged 71); Chicago, Illinois
- Burial place: Rosehill Cemetery
- Occupations: Businessperson, stockbroker
- Known for: A founder of the Chicago Stock Exchange, chairman and president
- Spouse: Ellen Martin (m. 1869)

Signature
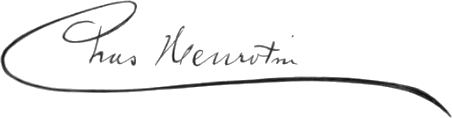

Charles Henrotin (April 15, 1843 – July 25, 1914) was a Belgian-American businessman involved in the stock market.

== Early life and education ==
Charles Henrotin was born in Brussels, Belgium on April 15, 1843. He attended the Polytechnic School at Tournai.

== Career ==
After graduating school, Henrotin came to the United States and began working at the Merchants' Loan and Trust Company in Chicago in 1861. He became a banker and broker in 1878. In this role, he was broker for major enterprises such as the sale of the American Brewing and Malting Company and the Union Stock Yards Company, as well as large financial interests in Europe.

He was the principal founder of the Chicago Stock Exchange in 1882. He was elected its chairman and president that year, and went on to serve as president for three terms.

He helped establish the Chicago Board of Trade, and was a not director of the World's Fair at Chicago. He became a member of the New York Stock Exchange in 1886.

== Personal life ==
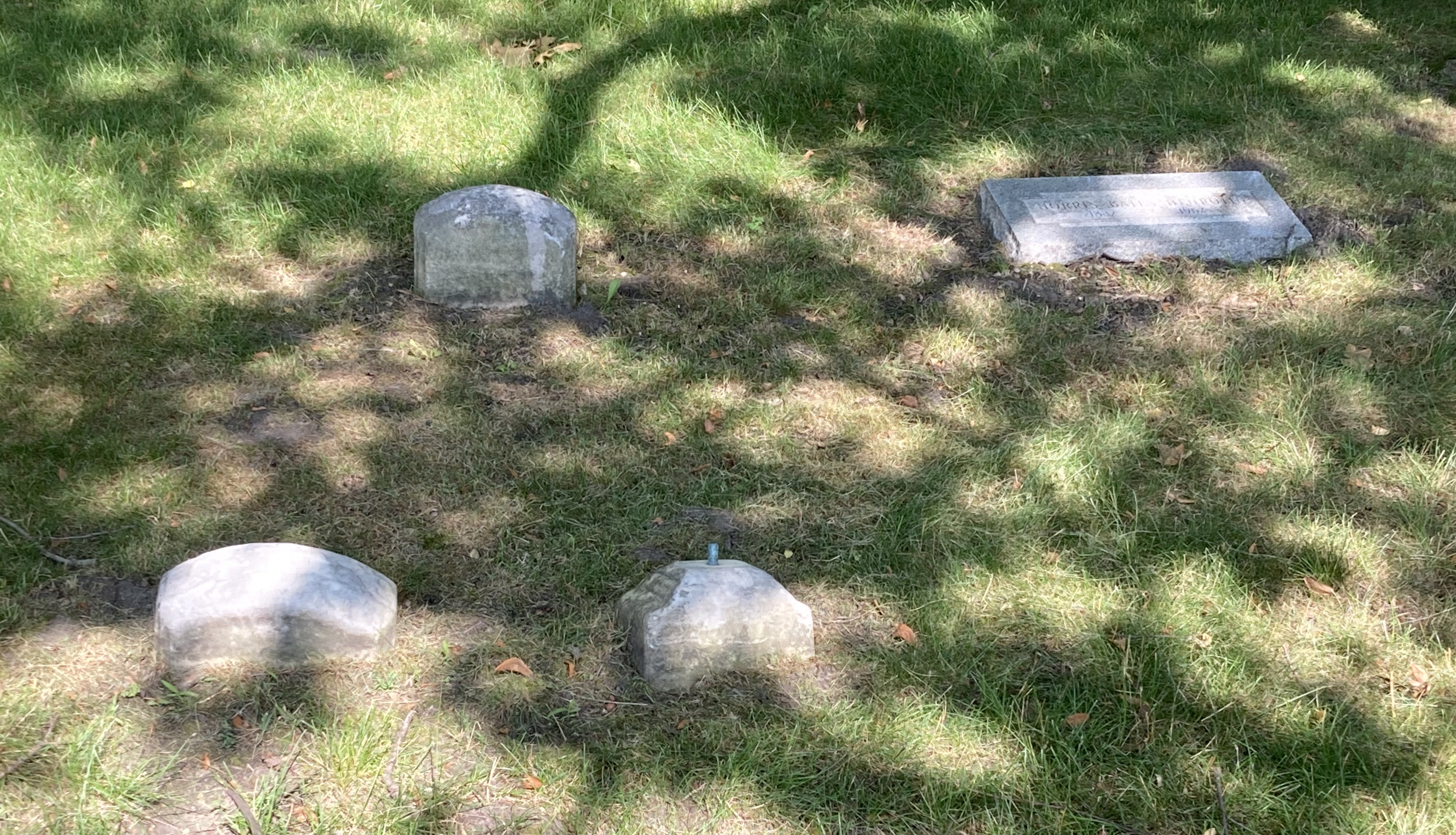
Charles' and Ellen's graves (bottom-center stone) at Rosehill Cemetery

Henrotin married Ellen Martin on September 2, 1869. He was a member of the Chicago Club, Union Club of Chicago, and a Chevalier, Legion of Honor (France), with other orders from Belgium and Turkey. He died at his home in Chicago on July 25, 1914.

He and Ellen are buried at Rosehill Cemetery in Chicago.

== See also ==
- Stock broker
