= St. Louis Stock Exchange =

Stock exchange in Missouri, US, 1899–1949

- Type: Regional stock exchange
- Location: St. Louis, Missouri, United States
- Founded: 1899
- Closed: September 1949
- Key people: George Herbert Walker (president)
- Currency: USD

The St. Louis Stock Exchange was a regional stock exchange located in St. Louis, Missouri. Opened in 1899, in September 1949, the St. Louis Stock Exchange was acquired by the Chicago Stock Exchange, and renamed the Midwest Stock Exchange.

== History ==
=== Early years of the exchange ===
The St. Louis Stock Exchange opened in 1899. Trade volume peaked a year later with $44 million. In April 1902, St. Louis Stock Exchange president Alfred H. Bauer announced that committees had been elected to serve for one year terms. The constitution and bylaws of the new exchange were adopted on January 3, 1903, and made effective on February 1, 1903.

According to stock exchange president George Herbert Walker, business transacted on the exchange floor was less in 1904 than in 1903, as with other regional stock exchanges in major cities excluding New York. Trust companies in 1904 traded 18,440 shares for $3,567,591, banks traded 5,698 shares valued at $1,548,878, mining stocks of 17,077 were traded for $7,866, and miscellaneous stocks saw 12,144 shares traded for $770,767. A great deal of business was also done with United Railways, St. Louis Transit Company, and Brown Brothers. Total transactions in 1904 came to $10.5 million, against $16.4 million in 1903. On November 13, 1908, The New York Times reported that stock value in St. Louis banks and trusts companies had increased by $3,020,000 since October 31, due to a "complete revival of confidence" in the St. Louis Stock Exchange. The times stated that brokers related that it was the heaviest buying the city had seen in three years, leaving them "almost unable to accommodate their patrons." Stock value and trading was for companies such as the Mercantile Trust Company, the Boatmen's Bank, the Mechanics' American National Bank, the National Bank of Commerce, and industrial and manufacturing stocks such as the American Car and Foundry Company. On November 13, the latter announced it would reopen its Detroit shops soon as a result on secured contracts.

=== Financial crisis of 1914 ===
After closing for four months during a financial crisis on July 30, 1914, the president of the exchange board of directors announced on December 4, 1914, that the St. Louis Stock Exchange would open the following week. In a meeting on December 7, the governors of the exchange had a special meeting and voted to resume trading in stocks unanimously, with price restrictions and after assurances that bankers believed the financial situation had improved. The meeting noted 180 stocks made public, out of the 565 issues on the board. A statement from the exchange's Committee of Five asserted that the exchange would open again on Saturday, December 12, with hours resuming between 10 and 3 o'clock each day except Saturday, when dealings ended at noon. On the reopening, the Times reported that "opening prices were steady and demand for high-grade securities good."

=== Market and policy changes ===
On April 13, 1926, directors of the exchange voted to extend trading time from 75 minutes to two and a half hours, from 10 am to 12:30 pm except Saturday, "thereby placing the local exchange on a parity with exchanges in other cities." The board also established stock lists of trading quotations. As of early 1927, Harry S. Rein was chairman of the exchange. On January 12, 1927, he announced that in 1925, the exchange had seen stock sales totaling 591,966 shares, or $32,087,323. In 1926, it had fallen to a total of 382,856 shares, or $17,101,763 in value.

On March 26, 1929, the exchange saw a session close without an issue scoring a gain, as "nine issues reached new lows" for the year.

On April 5, 1938, the exchange elected J. Gates Williams as president to succeed president Ben F. Jacobs.

=== Proposed merger ===
On August 30, 1948, the press reported that several brokers in multiple cities were discussing a large merger of several midwestern stock exchanges. The plan at that point included exchanges in Chicago, Detroit, Cleveland, Cincinnati, New Orleans, and St. Louis. With a projected volume of $350,000,000 a year in trading, it would make the proposed exchange the largest in the United States outside of New York. St. Louis Stock Exchange officers refused to talk to the press about the plan, and the exchange at that point had a normal business annually of $7,000,000. On May 26, the members of the exchange voted twenty-six to eight in favor of the merger. On June 10, 1949, The New York Times reported that the proposed merger had resulted in disagreement within St. Louis financial circles. A key anti-consolidation group was said to include the four companies whose stocks were most active on the local St. Louis exchange: Wagner Electric Company, Laclede Steel Company, F. Burkart Manufacturing Company, and Griesedieck-Western Brewery Company.

On June 27, 1949, the president of the St. Louis Chamber of Commerce, George C. Smith, said that the proposed September 1 merger between the St. Louis exchange with three exchanges would cause "some grave injuries" to the city. The banks also maintained that they might lose most of the exchange business to Chicago banks, where the new proposed exchange would be headquartered. a group opposing the merger sought a new ballot on the project, maintaining that the merger would omit from slower moving St. Louis stocks from the Chicago listings, leaving them to be sold over-the-counter in St. Louis.

On June 29, president of St. Louis exchange John A. Isaacs Jr. declared in letter to exchange members and all St. Louis banks that the merger was "the only practicable means of providing a strong market for midwest companies," and a necessity. He noted that business in the exchange had been drying up, with much of the business moving east.

More protests were lodged in early July 1949, by four brokers in the firm: Paul Brown & Co, A. G. Edwards & Sons, Edward D. Jones & Co. and I. M. Simon & Co. They said they "deny the right of any majority of the members of the exchange here to dissolve." On July 14, 1949, the governing committee of the St. Louis Stock Exchange signed a formal contract to join the new Midwest exchange, overruling the four members firm who had recently voiced opposition. The official merger between the five midwest exchanges was set for September 15, 1949.

On June 29, 1949, St. Louis exchange president John A. Isaacs Jr. promoted the merger in a letter, and stated that recent lows in trading were "not limited to St. Louis. The trend has been shared by other regional exchanges. After meeting (on the subject of a merger), it was concluded the only way to save an active exchange market for midwestern securities was to concentrate the trading on one large exchange."

=== Merger ===
In September 1949, the St. Louis Stock Exchange was acquired by the Chicago Stock Exchange, and renamed the Midwest Stock Exchange.

== See also ==
- St. Louis Mining and Stock Exchange
- List of former stock exchanges in the Americas
- List of stock exchange mergers in the Americas
- Economy of St. Louis
