= Philadelphia Stock Exchange =

Oldest stock exchange in the US

- Philadelphia Stock Exchange Building
- U.S. National Register of Historic Places
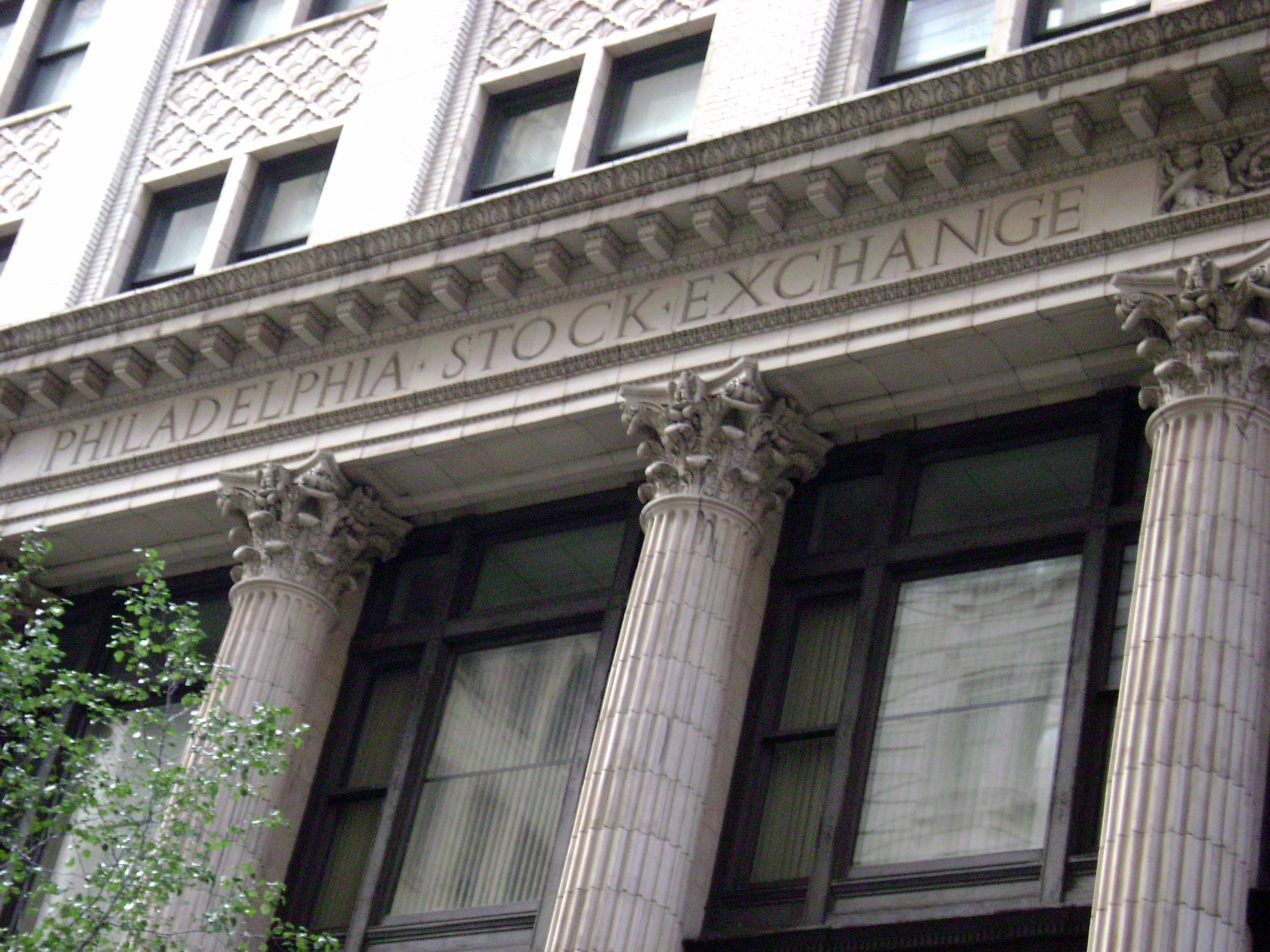
- One of the former locations of The Philadelphia Stock Exchange at 1411 Walnut Street

- Location within Philadelphia Location within Pennsylvania Location within the United States
- Location: 1409–11 Walnut St., Philadelphia, Pennsylvania, U.S.
- Coordinates: 39°56′59″N 75°09′54″W
- Built: 1911
- Architect: Horace Trumbauer
- NRHP reference No.: 82003812
- Added to NRHP: August 31, 1982

Stock exchanges (listing venues) owned by Nasdaq, Inc.

Philadelphia Stock Exchange (PHLX), now known as Nasdaq PHLX, is the first stock exchange established in the United States and the oldest stock exchange in the nation. The exchange is owned by Nasdaq, which acquired it in 2007 for $652 million, and is headquartered in Philadelphia.

The exchange was founded in 1790 and originally named the Board of Brokers of Philadelphia and sometimes referred to as the Philadelphia Board of Brokers. In 1875, the Board of Brokers changed its name to the Philadelphia Stock Exchange.

In 1949, the exchange merged with the Baltimore Stock Exchange and was renamed the Philadelphia-Baltimore Stock Exchange. In 1954, it merged with the Washington Stock Exchange and was renamed the Philadelphia-Baltimore-Washington Stock Exchange, often abbreviated PBW. In 1969, the exchange acquired the Pittsburgh Stock Exchange.

== History ==
=== 1790–1875: Board of Brokers ===
The Philadelphia Stock Exchange was established in 1790, making it the first securities exchange in the United States.

Over its more than 200 years in existence, the Philadelphia Stock Exchange has had various titles and has been located in various buildings around Philadelphia. Founded in 1790 as the "Board of Brokers," it was located at the Merchants Coffee House, now known as the City Tavern, at the corner of Second and Walnut Streets.

In 1831, Stephen Girard’s Bank had formed the "Philadelphia Merchant’s Exchange Company" to erect a new building to house the Board of Brokers and other groups. The Board of Brokers moved into the Merchants Exchange Building at 3rd and Dock Streets in 1834 following a fire at the coffee house.

As of January 1, 1874, the par price for membership in the Philadelphia Board of Brokers was $1,000, with 198 seats, and "not others are attainable under $2,000 each." The board represented a market capital of around $350,000.

=== 1875–1949: Philadelphia Stock Exchange ===
In 1875, the Board of Brokers changed its name to the Philadelphia Stock Exchange.

In 1876, the exchange moved to the rear of the Girard Bank Building, formerly the First Bank of the United States. It stayed there until 1888. From 1888 to 1902, the exchange moved to the Drexel Building which was located near Fifth Street and Chestnut. Between 1902 and 1912, the exchange returned to the Merchants Exchange Building. In 1913, it moved to a building at 1411 Walnut Street, now listed on the National Register of Historic Places.

In 1951, the exchange moved to the Central Penn Bank Building at 1401 Walnut Street. It stayed there until 1966 when it moved to a newly constructed building (currently the Sofitel Hotel) at 17th and Sansom. The 1700 block of Ionic Street, a narrow thoroughfare just north of this building, was renamed Stock Exchange Place and was still signed as such as of 2017.

In December 1968, in response to a fiscal crisis, Philadelphia imposed a $0.05 per share stock transfer tax for all transactions on the PHLX. On January 2, 1969, the PHLX moved its trading floor to an office building, then known as the Decker Building, just across a street from the city boundaries in Bala Cynwyd to avoid the tax. In February, a court ruled that the tax was illegal, and the PHLX moved its trading floor back to its headquarters in the city.

In 1981, the exchange moved to 19th and Market, where it stayed until 2017 when it moved to its current location in the newly built FMC Tower.

=== 1949–present: Mergers ===
The exchange merged with the Baltimore Stock Exchange in 1949. The exchange was then named the Philadelphia-Baltimore Stock Exchange. The Baltimore Stock Exchange then migrated out of its Baltimore Stock Exchange Building, later renamed the Totman Building, to a new home base in Philadelphia.

The exchange merged with the Washington Stock Exchange in 1954. The exchange was known as the Philadelphia-Baltimore-Washington Stock Exchange (often abbreviated as PBW) after those mergers. In 1969, the exchange acquired the Pittsburgh Stock Exchange, and maintained an auxiliary trading floor in Pittsburgh until 1974.

On October 22, 1981, trading was halted on both the Chicago Board of Trade and the Philadelphia Stock Exchange after anonymous callers said bombs had been placed in those buildings.

In 2005, a number of large financial firms purchased stakes in the exchange as a hedge against growing consolidation of stock trading by the New York Stock Exchange and Nasdaq. These firms—Morgan Stanley, Citigroup, Credit Suisse First Boston, UBS, Merrill Lynch and Citadel LLC—collectively owned about 89% of the exchange.

On October 20, 2007, The Wall Street Journal reported that the exchange was for sale by a group of its shareholders, and was expected to be sold for about $600 million.

On November 7, 2007, NASDAQ announced a "definitive agreement" to purchase PHLX for $652 million, with the transaction expected to close in early 2008. On July 24, 2008, the acquisition was completed, creating the third-largest options market in the U.S.

On October 29, 2012, the stock exchange was shut down for two days due to Hurricane Sandy. The last time the stock exchange was closed due to weather for a full two days was on March 12 and 13, 1888.

As of 2014, the exchange handles trades for approximately 3,600 equity options, 15 index options, and a number of FX options. The PHLX has more than 16% of United States market share in exchange-listed stock and ETF options trading.

In March 2020, PHLX temporarily moved to all-electronic trading due to the COVID-19 pandemic. Along with the NYSE and the BSE, the PHLX reopened on May 26, 2020.

== Locations ==
- 1790–1834 – Merchants Coffee House (City Tavern), 138 South 2nd Street at Walnut Street
- 1834–1876 – Merchants' Exchange Building, 143 South 3rd Streets at Dock Street
- 1876–1888 – Girard Bank Building, 120 South 3rd Street, between Walnut and Chestnut Streets
- 1888–1902 – Drexel Building, near Chestnut and South 5th Streets
- 1902–1912 – Merchants' Exchange Building, 143 South 3rd Streets at Dock Street
- 1913–1951 – 1411 Walnut Street, between South Broad and South 15th Streets
- 1951–1966 – Central Penn Bank Building, 1401 Walnut Street, between South Broad and South 15th Streets
- 1966–1981 – 120 South 17th Street, between Sansom Street and Stock Exchange Place (Ionic Street)
- January–February 1969 – Drecker Building, Bala Cynwyd, Pennsylvania (trading floor only)
- 1981–2017 – Market and South 19th Streets
- 2017–present – FMC Tower at Cira Centre South, 2929 Walnut Street, between Schuylkill Expressway and South 30th Street

== Hours ==
The exchange's normal trading sessions are from 9:30 am to 4:00 pm on all days of the week except Saturdays, Sundays and holidays declared by the exchange in advance.

== See also ==
- Merchants' Exchange Building
- Philadelphia Bourse
- List of stock exchanges
- List of stock exchanges in the Americas
- List of stock exchange mergers in the Americas
- National Register of Historic Places listings in Center City, Philadelphia
