= Cleveland Stock Exchange =

Stock exchange in Cleveland, Ohio, U.S.

- Type: Private regional stock exchange
- Location: Cleveland, Ohio, United States
- Coordinates: 41°52′33″N 87°37′55″W
- Founded: 1899
- Closed: October 1949
- Currency: USD

The Cleveland Stock Exchange was a stock exchange in Cleveland, Ohio, U.S.

== History ==
The Cleveland Stock Exchange was established in 1899, and began operations on April 16, 1900, at the Williamson Building (today the location of the 200 Public Square skyscraper). It later moved to the Union Trust Building on Euclid Avenue. In October 1949, its members voted to dissolve and join the Midwest Stock Exchange.

== See also ==
- List of former stock exchanges in the Americas
- List of stock exchange mergers in the Americas
