= Chicago Stock Exchange =

American stock exchange (1882–2025)

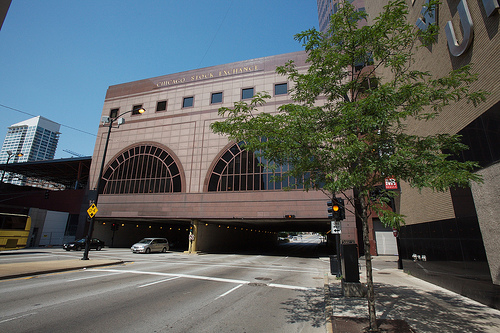
- 2006
- Type: Stock exchange
- Location: Chicago, Illinois, U.S.
- Coordinates: 41°52′33″N 87°37′55″W
- Founded: March 21, 1882 (144 years ago)
- Closed: 2025 (1 year ago)
- Owner: Intercontinental Exchange (ICE) (last)
- Currency: USD

The Chicago Stock Exchange (CHX), in its last years known as NYSE Chicago, was a stock exchange in Chicago, Illinois, U.S. Founded in 1882 as a national securities exchange and self-regulatory organization, it operated under the oversight of the U.S. Securities and Exchange Commission (SEC). Intercontinental Exchange (ICE) acquired CHX in July 2018 and the exchange rebranded as NYSE Chicago in February 2019.

Under NYSE, the exchange was electronic only and focused on the niche market for hedge funds. In February 2025, NYSE announced plans to close the now-small Chicago office moving operations to Dallas to create NYSE Texas, where the exchange would again list companies on an electronic-only platform.

== History ==
=== 19th century ===
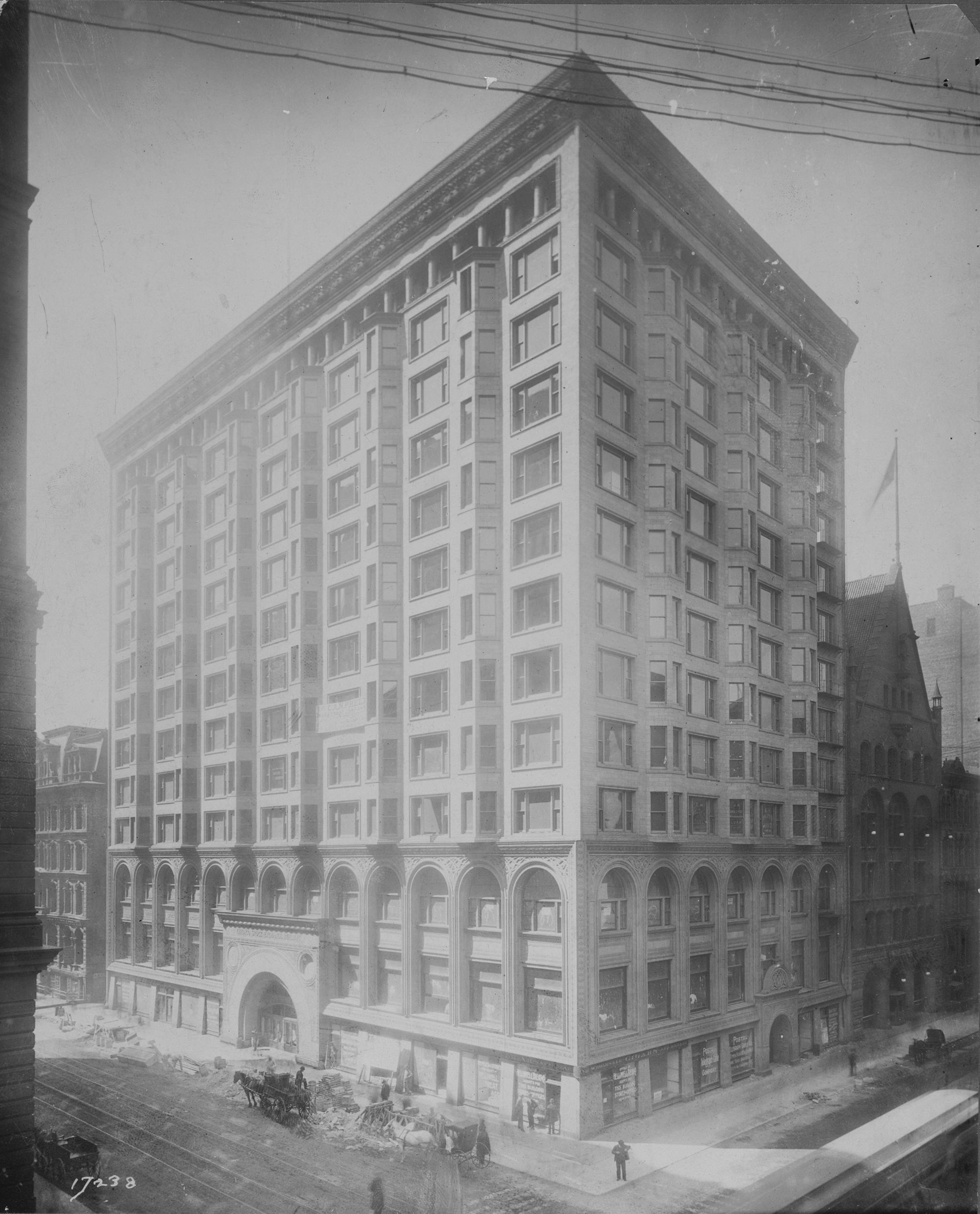
Old Chicago Stock Exchange Building, ca. 1894

The Chicago Stock Exchange was founded in a formal meeting on March 21, 1882. At this time, Charles Henrotin was elected the chairman and president. In April that year, a lease was taken out at 115 Dearborn Street for the location of the exchange and during that year 750 memberships were sold. On May 15, 1882, the Chicago Stock Exchange officially became public and opened its offices, with Henrotin being the first to promote it along with some business associates.

In 1894, the Chicago Stock Exchange moved its trading floor to the Chicago Stock Exchange Building, designed by the firm of Adler & Sullivan, which was located at corner of Washington and LaSalle streets. The Chicago Stock Exchange moved out of the building in 1908. The old building was demolished in 1972, but the original trading floor and main entrance can now be found at the Art Institute of Chicago. The exchange began to flourish significantly in the late 1880s, with the rate of transactions of stocks and bonds increasing and earning them big profits.

=== 20th century ===
In July 1914, the Exchange closed as a result of World War I, and remained closed until December 11. In October 1915, the basis of quoting and trading in stocks changed from percent to par value to dollars. On April 26, 1920, the Chicago Stock Exchange Stock Clearing Corporation was established. On October 29, 1929, the stock market crashed, resulting in a very difficult time period for the Chicago Stock Exchange, and the stock market in general.

In 1949, the CHX merged with the exchanges of St. Louis, Cleveland and Minneapolis/St. Paul to form the Midwest Stock Exchange, which kept its headquarters in Chicago. In 1959, the New Orleans Stock Exchange became part of the Midwest Stock Exchange, and in the early 1960s the Midwest Stock Exchange Service Corporation was established to provide centralized accounting for member firms.

In April 1978, the Chicago Stock Exchange launched an Intermarket Trading System (ITS), a system that allowed orders to be sent from one exchange to another to ensure that customers received the best execution available. In the 1980s, the Chicago Stock Exchange made several technological advancements to improve trading. In 1982, the CHX launched the MAX system, which allowed CHX to be one of the first stock exchanges to provide fully automated order execution. In 1987, the CHX implemented programs to trade Nasdaq securities.

In the 1990s, the Exchange had a rebirth, and in 1993 changed its name back to the Chicago Stock Exchange, reflecting its roots and identity within the Chicago financial community. In 1997 the Chicago Stock Exchange began trading exchange-traded funds (ETFs).

=== 21st century ===
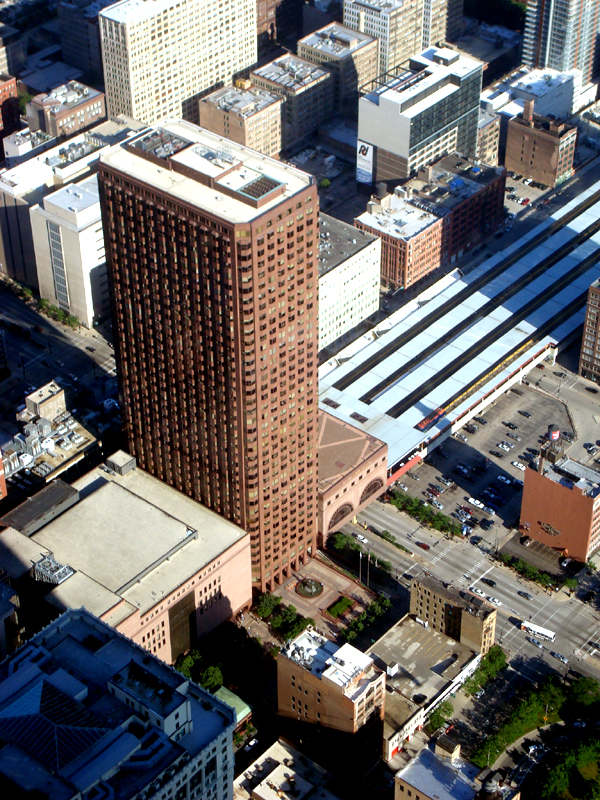
The Chicago Stock Exchange/LaSalle Train Station as viewed from the Sears Tower in July 2008

At the beginning of the new millennium, several major changes occurred. In 2005, the SEC approved a change of the ownership structure of the CHX from a not-for-profit, member-owned company to a for-profit, public stockholder-owned corporation (demutualization). The CHX now operates as a direct and wholly owned subsidiary of CHX Holdings, Inc., a Delaware corporation. Later in 2005, the CHX implemented the Electronic Book trading platform; the predecessor technology of the New Trading Model's Matching System. In 2006, the Exchange announced regulatory and shareholder approval of an investment in CHX by Bank of America Corporation, Bear Stearns (acquired by JP Morgan Chase in 2008), E*TRADE FINANCIAL Corporation, and Goldman, Sachs & Co. In the same year, the CHX announced that it had completed the migration to the New Trading Model platform (the CHX Matching System).

The National Stock Exchange ceased trading operations on May 30, 2014, bringing the number of active stock exchanges in the United States to 11. Wrote Bloomberg, that left "just one public [stock] exchange, Chicago Stock Exchange Inc., that isn't owned [by] Bats, Nasdaq OMX Group or IntercontinentalExchange Group Inc."

On February 5, 2016, Chongqing Casin Enterprise Group, a Chinese-led investment group, entered into a definitive agreement to acquire CHX Holdings, Inc., the parent corporation of the Chicago Stock Exchange, for an undisclosed amount, which is subject to regulatory approvals. The privately held Casin Group was founded in 1997. A minority ownership position is held by Bank of America, E-Trade, Goldman Sachs and JPMorgan Chase. The acquisition is valued to be less than $100 million. However, the deal was questioned by then-candidate Donald Trump during his 2016 presidential campaign. Moreover, Congressman Robert Pittenger urged the United States Department of the Treasury to look into the Casin Group's background. By August 2017, the deal was still pending, with the U.S. Securities and Exchange Commission expressing reservations. The sale was blocked by the government in February 2018.

The New York Stock Exchange's parent company, Intercontinental Exchange Incorporated, agreed to acquire the 136-year-old market for an undisclosed amount. CHX continued to operate as a registered national securities exchange until the end of 2019 when CHX ceased to exist.

In February 2025, NYSE announced plans to close the now small Chicago office moving operations to Dallas, Texas, to create NYSE Texas, where the exchange would again list companies on an electronic only platform.

== Trading on the CHX ==
The CHX Matching System was designed for full electronic trade matching. Publicly traded companies do not need to be listed on the CHX to be traded at CHX; SEC rules allow the CHX to trade stocks listed on other exchanges.

In 2016, CHX rolled out its on-demand auction product, CHX SNAP (Sub-second Non-displayed Auction Process), which received regulatory approval from the Securities and Exchange Commission in October 2015 and a thorough review from the Federal Reserve Bank of Chicago. CHX SNAP is designed to facilitate bulk trading of securities on a lit market and to minimize speed and information advantages enjoyed by only a few market participants.

== See also ==
- Chicago Stock Exchange Arch
- Chicago Curb Exchange
- List of stock exchanges in the Americas
- List of stock exchange mergers in the Americas
