= American Stock Exchange Building =

Building in Manhattan, New York

- U.S. National Register of Historic Places
- U.S. National Historic Landmark
- U.S. Historic district – Contributing property
- New York State Register of Historic Places
- New York City Landmark
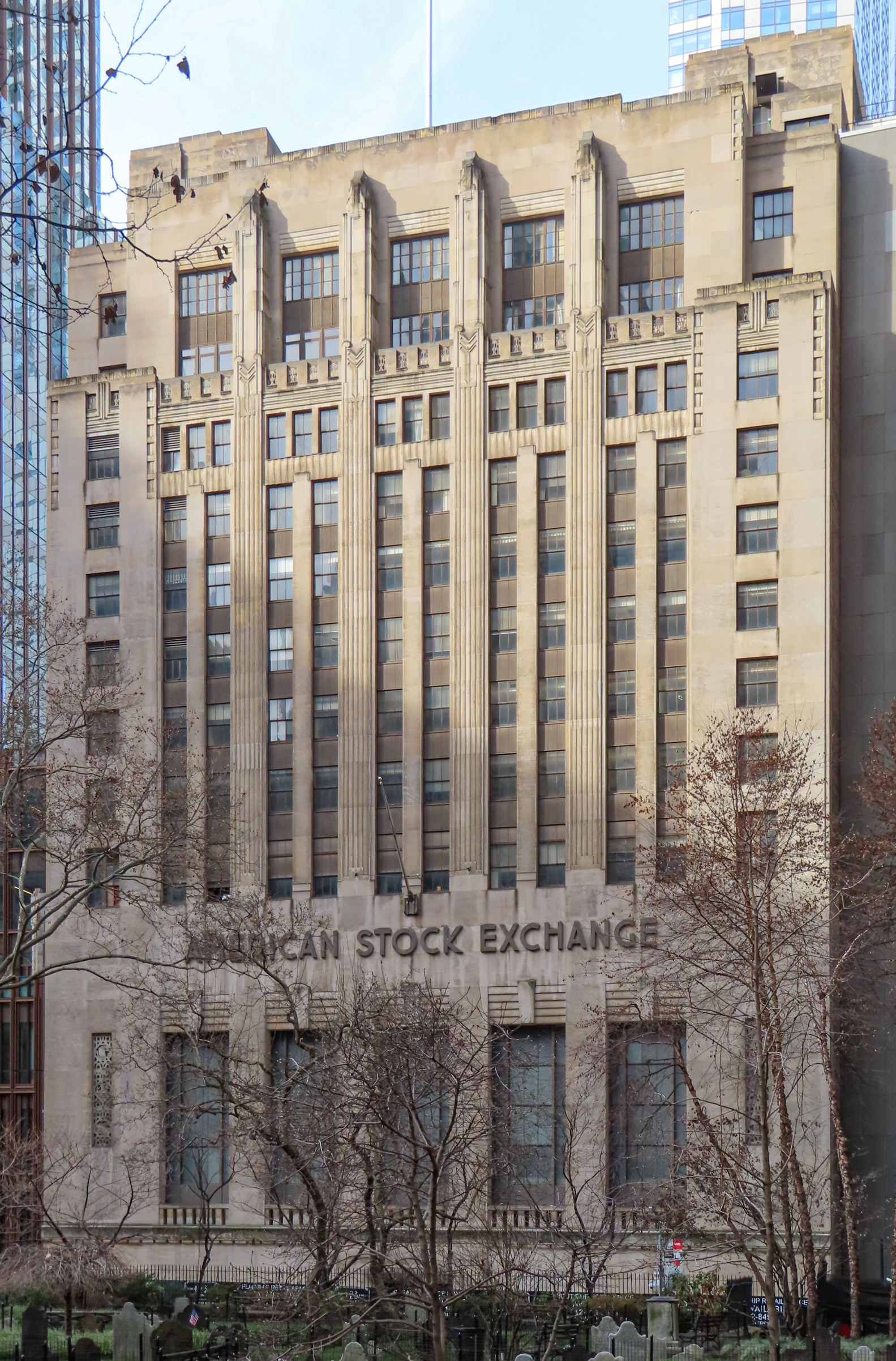
- Location: 86 Trinity Place, Lower Manhattan, New York City
- Coordinates: 40°42′32″N 74°00′46″W
- Built: 1921 (original building); 1931 (expansion)
- Architectural style: Art Deco
- Part of: Wall Street Historic District (ID07000063)
- NRHP reference No.: 78001867
- NYSRHP No.: 06101.000610
- NYCL No.: 2515

Significant dates
- Added to NRHP: June 2, 1978
- Designated NHL: June 2, 1978
- Designated CP: February 20, 2007
- Designated NYSRHP: June 23, 1980
- Designated NYCL: June 26, 2012

The American Stock Exchange Building, formerly known as the New York Curb Exchange Building and also known as 86 Trinity Place or 123 Greenwich Street, is the former headquarters of the American Stock Exchange. Designed in two sections by Starrett & van Vleck, it is located between Greenwich Street and Trinity Place in the Financial District of Lower Manhattan in New York City, with its main entrance at Trinity Place. The building represents a link to the historical practices of stock trading outside the strictures of the New York Stock Exchange (NYSE), which took place outdoors "on the curb" prior to the construction of the structure.

The building was originally erected in 1921, thus improving the stature of the New York Curb Exchange, which had been a curbside exchange. The structure was enlarged between 1929 and 1931 following an increase in trading volume. The New York Curb Exchange was renamed the American Stock Exchange, commonly known as the AMEX for short, in 1953. The AMEX moved out after merging with the NYSE in 2008. The structure was subsequently purchased by developers who planned to convert the building into a hotel.

The original structure, facing Greenwich Street to the west, is designed in the Renaissance Revival style, with a set of large arched windows providing light to the former trading floor. The eastern expansion, on Trinity Place to the east, is designed in the Art Deco style as a 14-story building. The expanded structure contained offices and conference rooms, as well as an elaborately decorated facade with a central entrance and reliefs signifying the building's use. The American Stock Exchange Building was designated a National Historic Landmark in 1978 and was designated a city landmark by the New York City Landmarks Preservation Commission in 2012. It is also a contributing property to the Wall Street Historic District, a NRHP district created in 2007.

== Architecture ==
The American Stock Exchange Building stands in the Financial District, occupying a parcel that extends from Trinity Place to Greenwich Street, just south of Thames Street. It is a fourteen-story steel frame structure, with its formal facade, finished in limestone, facing Trinity Place. It measures 180 feet (55 m) wide at its widest point, and has a frontage of 170 feet (52 m) on Trinity Place and 174 feet (53 m) on Greenwich Street.

Both the original 1921 structure and its later enlargement were designed by the New York firm Starrett & van Vleck. The original structure was designed when most of Starrett & van Vleck's commissions were in the neoclassical style, while the addition was designed when Art Deco style was popular. The trading floor was trimmed in a Renaissance Revival style, but the main structure is distinctly Art Deco, a product of the 1929–31 addition. The Trinity Place annex may have been influenced by designs from the firm's younger employees, including Frank Gaertner, who had submitted the annex plans to the New York City Department of Buildings. The annex's style is similar to that of the Downtown Athletic Club and 21 West Street, located several blocks south, which were designed by Starrett & van Vleck during the same era. The Trinity Place addition also features metal reliefs depicting the types of commodities and securities traded on the exchange.

=== Facade ===
==== Greenwich Street ====
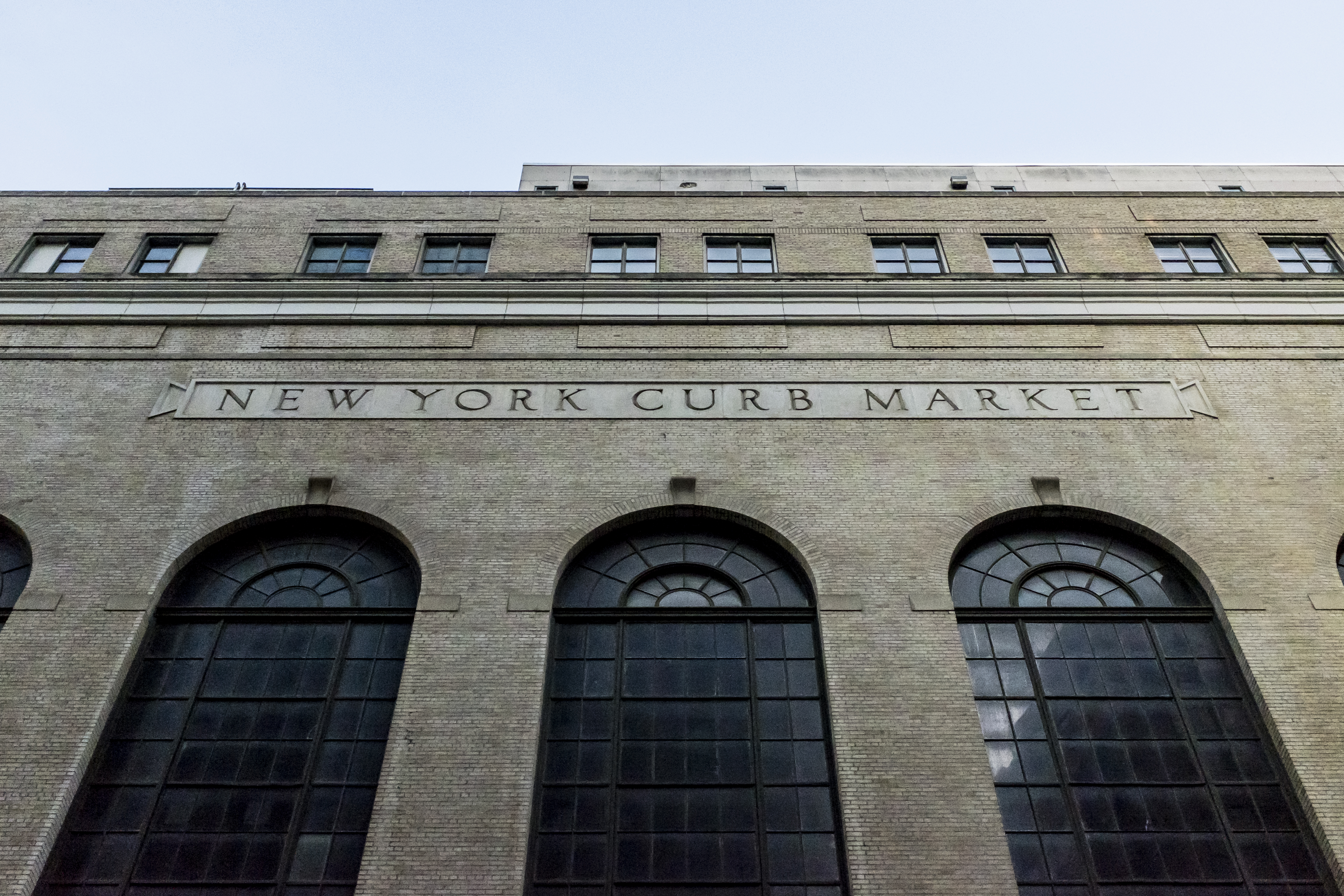
Top of the building's Greenwich Street facade with the "New York Curb Market" carved plaque below the sixth floor

The original structure was a six-story building with a fireproof limestone facade on Greenwich Street, measuring 174 by 44 feet (53 by 13 m). The Rider's Guide to New York City, published in 1923, described it as having a "simple classic design".

The facade facing Greenwich Street is of gray brick, and is divided into eight vertical bays. Five of these bays correspond to five three-story-tall large round-arch windows overlooking the main board room on the second floor; the National Park Service described them as "recall[ing] the airiness of the outdoor market". There is a corresponding pair of rectangular windows on the sixth floor above each round-arch window. The northernmost bay contains two windows on each floor, rather than an arched window spanning the second through fourth floors. The words new york curb market are carved above the arched windows.

==== Trinity Place ====
The Trinity Place facade is about 170 feet (52 m) long, and is 14 stories and 210 feet (64 m) tall. It is designed primarily in the Art Deco style and is divided into seven bays. The facade is made of limestone, and the base is made of granite; this might have served to distinguish it from the neighboring Trinity Court Building to the south.

The first floor facade is a limestone water table containing three entrances. The centrally located members' entrance had four glazed doors and a rounded frame, and previously contained a transom with glazed panels above the doors. To either side of the main entrance was a smaller entrance with three doors: the entrance to the north led to the elevator lobby, while the entrance to the south led to the nighttime clearing house and daytime branch (which later became a visitor's gallery).

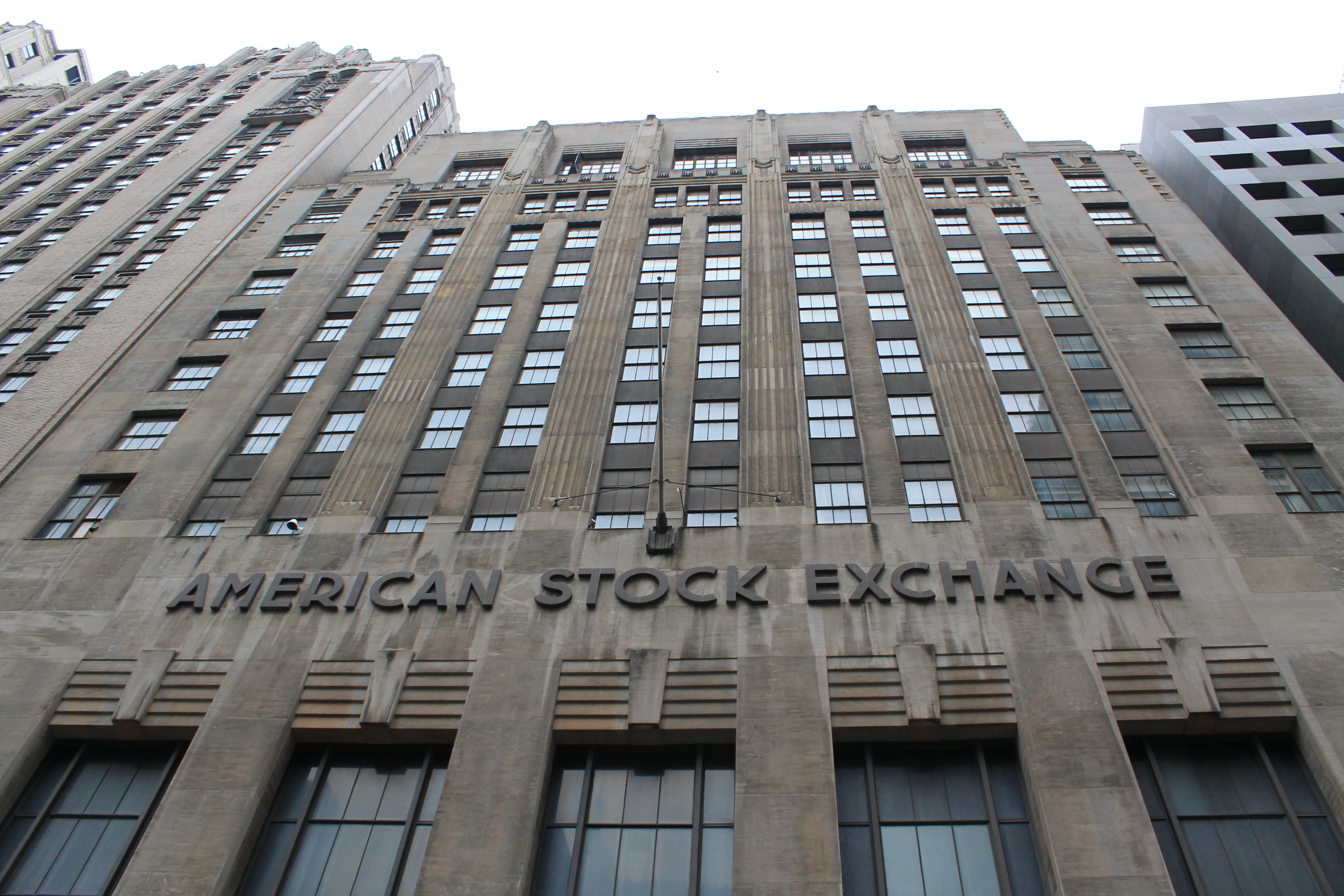
Looking up at the Trinity Place facade

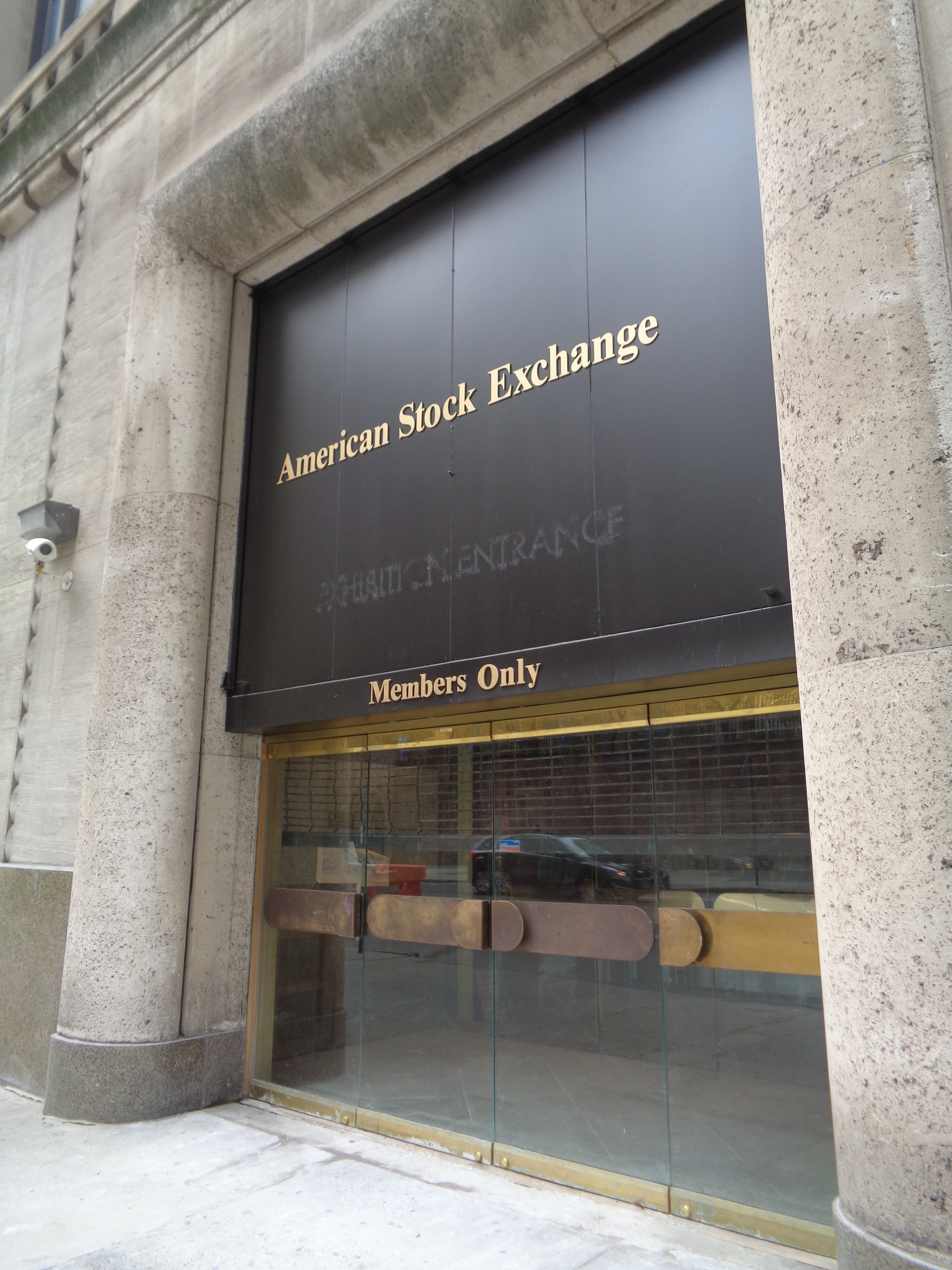
Main entrance

In the center bays, there are five long rectangular windows spanning the second through fifth floors, giving the Trinity Place facade a similar character to the Greenwich Street facade. The windows are flanked by recessed, decorated metal grills. Above the boardroom but below the offices, there is a windowless section of facade, behind which is a ventilation system. This section contains the metal letters american stock exchange. On the sixth through eleventh floors, each of the five center bays are divided into two sub-bays, which each contain one window per floor. The sub-bays are separated by Bedford limestone piers while the main bays are separated by fluted French limestone piers. On the 12th floor, each of the five center bays contain a set of three windows. The 13th and 14th floors are recessed slightly, with five 6-paned windows in the center bays of each floor. The tops of the piers are more angular compared to the rounded piers in the lower floor.

The embellishment is relatively sparse, since the annex had been built shortly after the Wall Street Crash of 1929. There are grilles depicting frozen fountains outside the 13th floor, which signified modernity at the time of the building's construction, and there are panels depicting financial activity in each of the windows overlooking the trading floor.

=== Features ===
The building has a floor area of 181,725 square feet (16,883 m^{2}). In the original six-story building, the main entrance was from Trinity Place; this entrance led to the main board room or trading room. The board room spans the entirety of the second through fifth floors and contained a coffered ceiling, measuring 65 feet (20 m) high. The room was originally 13,500 square feet (1,254 m^{2}), (Note: This could roughly be divided into a trading area of 9,598 square feet (891.7 m^{2}) and telephone sections with a combined area of 4,416 square feet (410 m^{2}). The telephone areas were located to the west and east of the trading area. However, the numbers may not add up precisely due to discrepancies in the original sources.) with 16 traders' posts designed to resemble street lamps, and a capacity of 700 traders. There was marble wainscoting on the lowest 16 feet (4.9 m) of the board room's exterior walls; the eastern wall was removed in the later expansion. There were balconies on either end of the board room with 350 telephone stations. After the 1931 expansion, the board room was expanded to 20,023 square feet (1,860 m^{2}) (Note: This could be roughly divided into a trading area of 14,132 square feet (1,313 m^{2}) and telephone sections with a combined area of 6,100 square feet (567 m^{2}). However, the numbers may not add up precisely due to discrepancies in the original sources.) with 28 traders' posts, and measured 152 feet (46 m) west-east by 162 feet (49 m) north-south. The annex featured an artificial cooling system; enunciator call boards on the north and south walls; expanded telephone exchanges on the west and east walls; and a 6-mile-long (9.7 km) system of pneumatic tubes from each traders' post to the ticket transmitter station. Later, the traders' posts were replaced with electronic posts, and the west wall received a series of clerks' desks.

The Greenwich Street entrance led to the cafeteria, workers' restaurant, and cloakroom in the basement. The upper floors were accessed by a set of three "high-speed" elevators in the northern portion of the lobby. There was ventilation equipment on the sixth floor. The seventh through fourteenth floors included offices, as well as rooms for each of the Curb Exchange's committees. There was a fully functional hospital for Curb Exchange employees on the ninth floor. The Board of Governors was housed on the thirteenth floor in a room measuring 51 by 35 feet (16 by 11 m).

== History ==
New York's stock trading activity historically took place in outdoor spaces until 1792, when a predecessor to the New York Stock Exchange (NYSE) was founded, and some trading moved into their building. Trading continued to take place "on the curb" outside the New York Stock Exchange Building. The outside traders benefited from the NYSE's refusal to allow trade in some types of securities, and became a leading marketplace for non-listed securities. This market had no fixed location, moving around as traffic and other conditions dictated.

Starting in the 1880s, Emanuel S. Mendels and Carl H. Pforzheimer attempted to standardize the loosely organized curb market of curbstone brokers on Broad Street. The New York Curb Market Agency was established in 1908 to codify trading practices. Three years later, the curbstone brokers had come to be known as the New York Curb Market, with a formal constitution and brokerage and listing standards. The Curb Market had offices in the Broad Exchange Building at Broad Street and Exchange Place, though trading remained outdoors.

=== New building ===
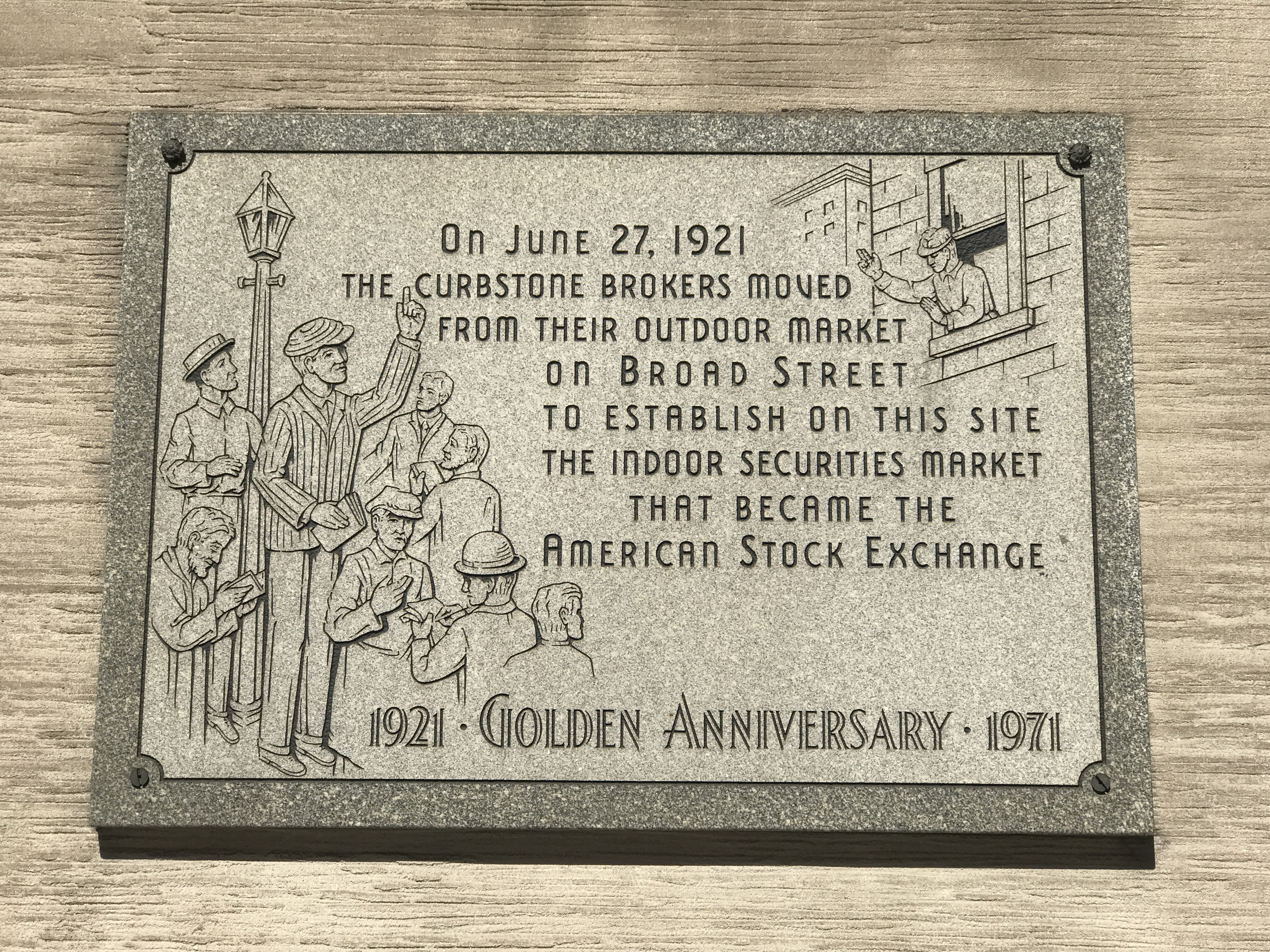
Plaque commemorating the opening of the building

By the 1910s, the Curb was handling an increasing volume of shares, and in 1915, its president Edward R. McCormick suggested moving the market indoors to increase investors' trust in the market. Though Mendels had suggested moving the Curb indoors as early as the 1890s, McCormick's proposal was seriously considered as a way to provide a weatherproof location for brokers as well as to remove "unethical bucketeers" from the exchange. In June 1919, the Curb's members formed the Curb Market Realty Association in an attempt to more strictly regulate the market. Later the same month, the Curb's members approved a set of rules that would allow the building to be erected, and limited its future membership to 500 members. The following month, there was a proposal to merge the Curb and the NYSE, a plan that was dropped in November 1919.

The Curb Market purchased a 26,000-square-foot (2,400 m^{2}) L-shaped plot between Greenwich Street and Trinity Place in December 1919 for $1.6 million (equal to about $30 million in 2025). The site had been the former location of a building occupied by the American Bank Note Company. Though the site was abutted by noisy elevated railways—the Ninth Avenue Line on Greenwich Street and the Sixth Avenue Line on Trinity Place—this was not considered significant, as subway stations had just opened nearby, which would later directly replace the elevated railways. Furthermore, the Trinity Place side was located across from the cemetery of Trinity Church, making it unlikely that any large development would be built there. The Curb paid out some of the land acquisition cost in January 1920, but temporarily halted planning that July due to a lack of funds or a suitable financing stream. The financial situation had improved by October 1920, when the New York Title & Mortgage Company promised $800,000 to finance the construction of the new structure.

Blueprints for the Curb Market structure were filed with the city government in November 1920. The original building was situated on Greenwich Street, with a passageway from Trinity Street to the main entrance; the rest of the Trinity Street side contained a small landscaped forecourt, which could accommodate a future building expansion or be sold off to pay the building's mortgage. Construction started within the month, with the Thompson–Starrett Co. as contractor. At the time, the structure was slated to cost $1.3 million. The Curb Market's brokers anxiously awaited the building's completion: historian Robert Sobel states anecdotally that one Curb member considered the new structure's completion more important over "the building of his own home", another equated it to "waiting out the birth of a new child", and a third compared it to a child "counting the days till Christmas". The restaurant space was leased out to Tankoos, Smith Co. in April 1921. The building opened on June 27, 1921, at which point the New York Curb Exchange was the second largest in the U.S., behind the NYSE. After moving indoors, the Curb Market grew to include a wide selection of issues, including "high-class industrial, public utilities, oils and domestic and foreign bonds", and within ten years, the Curb Market had 2,300 stocks on its list.

=== Stock exchange operation ===
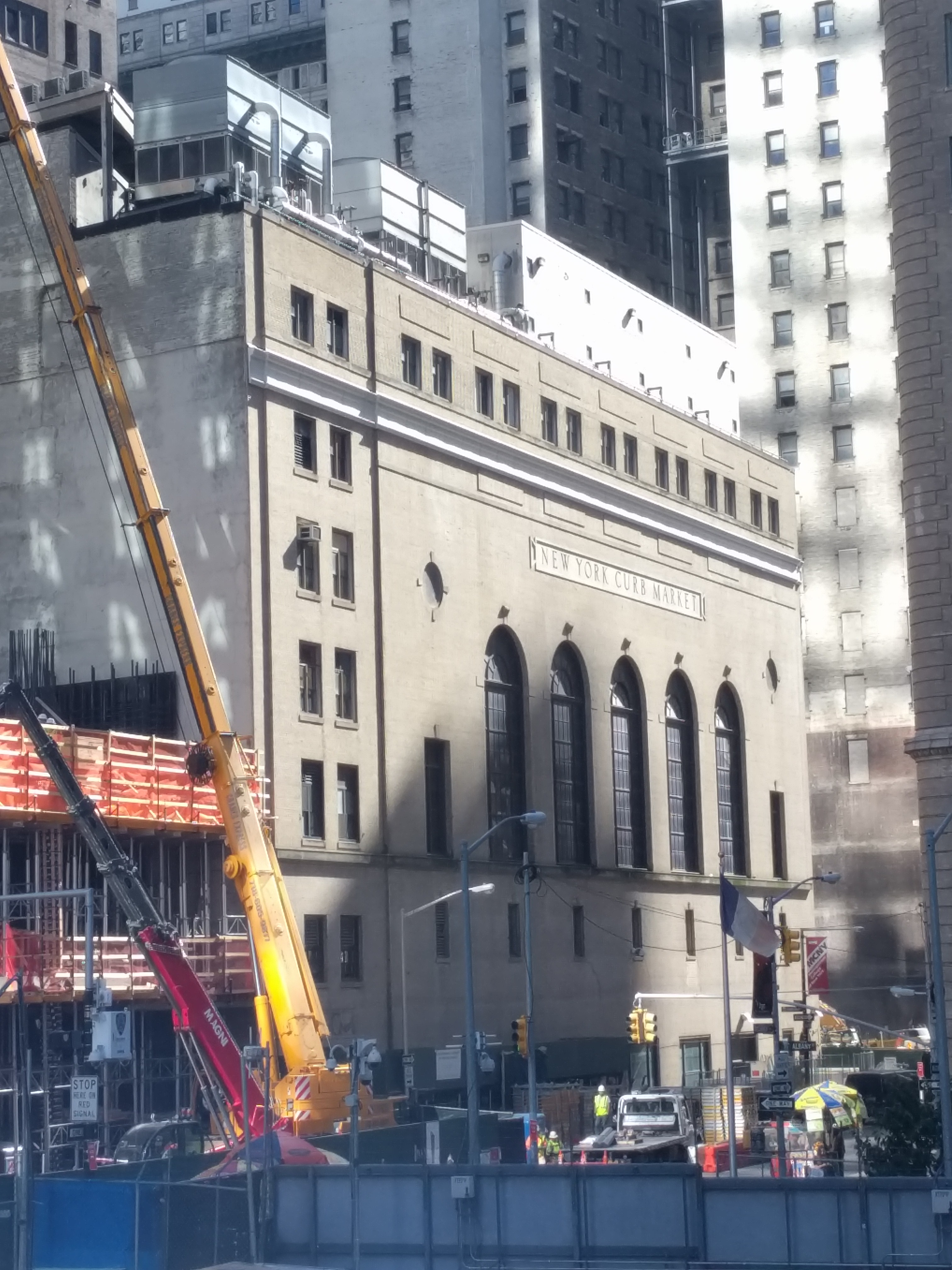
Seen from Greenwich Street

By 1929, the Curb Market had outgrown the operations of the original building. That year, the Curb's building committee proposed adding eight office floors above the board room, as well as expanding the board room, thus extending the Curb Market building into the remaining undeveloped portion of its lot. The board of governors received the plans that May and voted to approve the plan two months later; during this time, in June 1929, the New York Curb Market changed its name to the New York Curb Exchange. The Curb Exchange rehired Starrett & Van Vleck to build the annex. Plans were filed with the city government in January 1930, and construction of the annex started the next month. As part of the expansion, the adjacent Hamilton Building was acquired for $1.2 million. The steel work was about halfway completed when the cornerstone for the annex was laid in July 1930. The expanded structure was dedicated on September 14, 1931. The original building remained largely unchanged, except for the removal of its eastern wall to accommodate the annex.

The annex was designed with additional capacity for future growth, and should more space be necessitated, the Hamilton Building could be demolished for yet another expansion. The New York Times said that the new facilities could "take care of markets of much larger size than have yet been witnessed", and the Brooklyn Daily Eagle said "in many respects the building is more modern and up to date" compared to the NYSE building. The Curb Exchange soon became the leading international stock market. Sobel stated that the Curb "had more individual foreign issues on its list than [...] all other American securities markets combined." Nevertheless, the Curb's trading volume still suffered during the 1930s and 1940s with the onset of the Great Depression and then World War II. During the war, the Curb Exchange rented out four of the upper floors for defense purposes, and the Curb rented out a floor from the Hamilton Building.

The Curb Exchange was renamed the American Stock Exchange (AMEX) in 1953, and the exterior signage on Trinity Place was changed accordingly. The value of shares traded in the AMEX nearly doubled during the 1950s to $23 billion. To accommodate the increased volume, the AMEX filed plans to expand the trading floor in 1967, and subsequently reorganized the trading floor. In 1975, AMEX chairman Paul Kolton indicated that the exchange was studying whether it should split the trading room into two floors. Kolton said that the board of governors had budgeted $100,000 toward studying an expansion as part of a five-year expansion program. The next year, the exchange started considering relocation, even as it spent $2 million to expand its existing facilities. The AMEX considered moving to New Jersey, Connecticut, or Battery Park City, but its board of governors ultimately voted against these proposals. To encourage AMEX to stay in New York City, mayor Abraham Beame formed a task force to assist AMEX's expansion.

The American Stock Exchange Building was designated a National Historic Landmark in 1978, and by extension was added to the National Register of Historic Places (NRHP). By 1980, AMEX had abandoned its plans to relocate and instead formed a committee to study ways to expand the existing structure. As such, a mezzanine in the trading room was announced in 1981, and completed the next year for $7 million, thereby expanding the trading floor's capacity by 35% to 40%. After AMEX's 1998 merger with the National Association of Securities Dealers (NASD), it was announced that the NASD would renovate the building as part of the association's relocation into nearby One Liberty Plaza. The NASD sold AMEX in 2004. In 2007, the building was designated as a contributing property to the Wall Street Historic District, a NRHP district.

=== Redevelopment ===
NYSE acquired AMEX in January 2008, and AMEX sold off their building. On December 1 of that year, the American Stock Exchange Building was closed, and both the Amex Equities and Amex Options trading floors were moved to the NYSE Trading floor at 11 Wall Street. In 2011, the American Stock Exchange Building and the neighboring Western Electric building at 22 Thames Street were purchased by the partnership of Michael Steinhardt and Allan Fried at a cost of $65 million, a quarter of which was spent on the AMEX building. The partnership announced plans to renovate the Greenwich Street building into a retail structure with a hotel, and destroy 22 Thames Street, raising concerns from preservationists and neighborhood residents. The New York City Landmarks Preservation Commission subsequently designated the building as a city landmark in June 2012. That October, Fisher Brothers bought the 22 Thames Street lot, leaving Steinhardt and Fried with the former AMEX building.

In 2015, Clarion Partners purchased a 70% stake in the Curb Exchange building from Fried's company GHC Development. The old Stock Exchange building was used in November 2017 for an exhibit about the history of fashion house Louis Vuitton. The exhibit's success, as well as the continuing evolution of the Financial District into a "live-work-play" neighborhood with several notable tourist attractions, prompted Fried to move forward with his hotel proposal. In 2018, GHC Development and Clarion Partners announced that they would renovate the building into a hotel and retail complex, with expected completion by 2021. A concert venue by Live Nation Entertainment was also planned for the Greenwich Street side. In October 2021, Ron Burkle bought the building from Clarion for $155 million.

== Critical reception ==
The erection of the original building resulted in an increase in real estate values on Greenwich Street. The annex was described in the Wall Street Journal as having a "modernistic design". Sobel, writing about the history of AMEX, called the building "a tall, graceful structure" akin to buildings located further uptown. The New York City Landmarks Preservation Commission wrote in its landmark report that "the expanded Curb stood out for its height and modernity", comparing it to other stock exchange buildings, such as the classical designs of the older Merchant's Exchange at 55 Wall Street and the New York Mercantile Exchange at 6 Harrison Street. The National Park Service characterized the expanded building as "sleek, business-like".

== See also ==
- List of National Historic Landmarks in New York City
- National Register of Historic Places listings in Manhattan below 14th Street
- List of New York City Designated Landmarks in Manhattan below 14th Street
- Art Deco architecture of New York City
