= Curb trading =

In finance, curb trading is the trading of securities outside the mainstream stock exchange, "conducted via telephone or other methods after the official close of the market, initially performed in the street near the market."

This type of either because the company operating the exchange has very strict listing requirements (cf: alternative stock exchange), or because investors are so interested to continue trading even after the official business hours that they set up alternative avenues for their trading, sometimes even the curbs outside the main stock exchange, which is the origin of the phrase.

== See also ==
- Curbstone broker
- New York Curb Exchange
- American Stock Exchange (Amex or AMEX)
- Chicago Curb Exchange
- Pink Sheets
- Over-the-counter (finance)
- American depository receipt
- Dark pool
