= Curbstone broker =

Broker who conducts trading on the curbs of a financial district

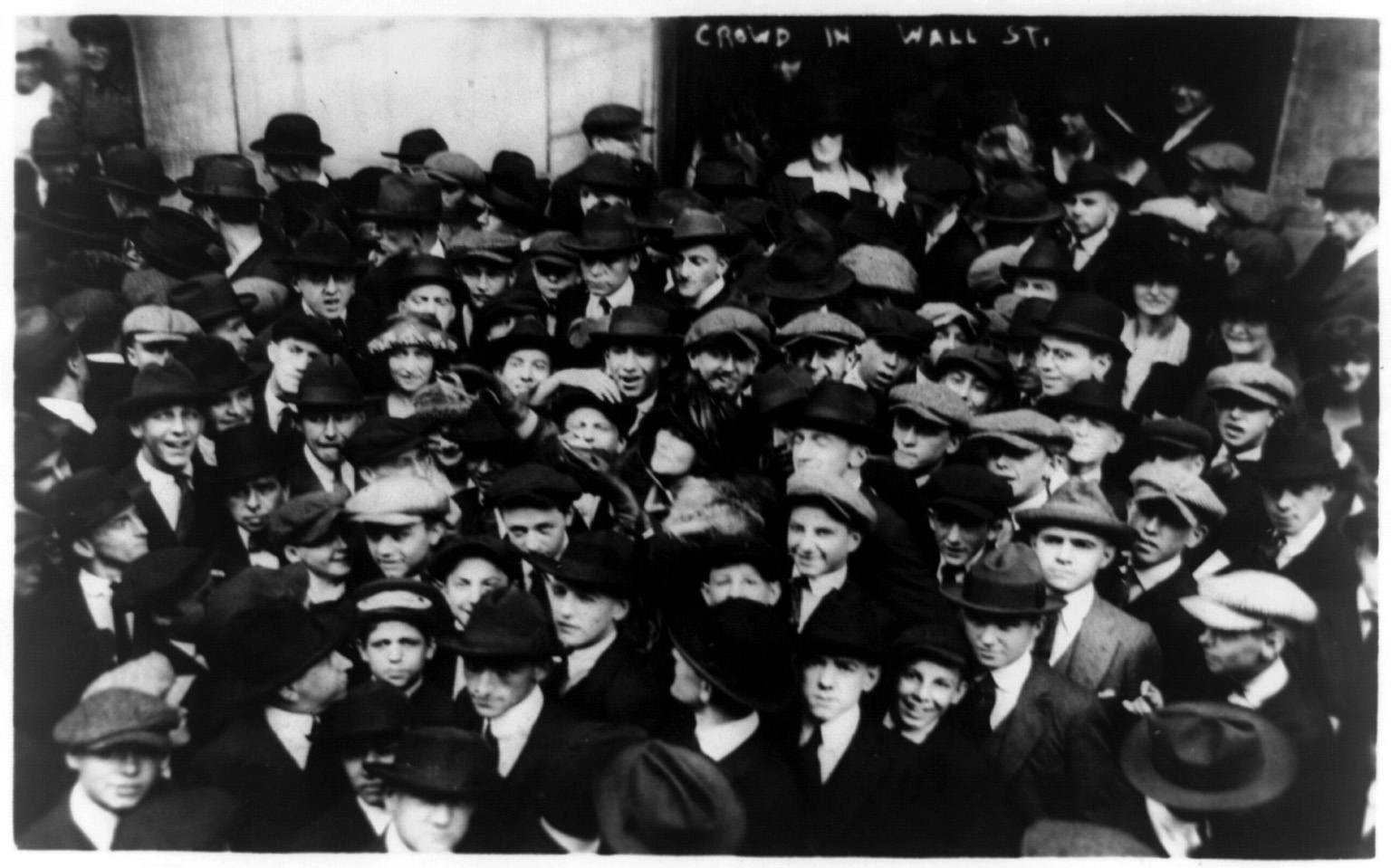
Curb brokers in Wall Street in 1920, a year before much of the trading was moved into a dedicated exchange building. That year, journalist Edwin C. Hill described the curb trading on lower Broad Street as "a roaring, swirling whirlpool... like nothing else under the astonishing sky that is its only roof."

The phrase curbstone broker, curb-stone broker or curb broker refers to a broker who conducts trading on the literal curbs of a financial district. Such brokers were prevalent in the 1800s and early 1900s, and the most famous curb market existed on Broad Street in the financial district of Manhattan. Curbstone brokers often traded stocks that were speculative in nature, as well as stocks in small industrial companies such as iron, textiles and chemicals (see curb trading). Efforts to organize and standardize the market started early in the 20th century under notable curb-stone brokers such as Emanuel S. Mendels.

== History ==
=== 1860s-1880s: New Board and Open Board ===
The New Board was an organization of curb-stone brokers established in 1836 in New York City to compete with the New York Stock and Exchange Board. The first local rival of the NYSE, the New Board emerged among the rough and tumble conditions of the very speculative curb-side trading during the down-turn in the market in general. The "curb" or "outside" trading exchange used a system in which "brokers and dealers traded directly with each other in the street near the exchange." To compete, the NYSE quickly began offering a second daily opportunity to buy or sell securities. At first, the New Board was very successful. It remained larger than the Big Board until 1845, but the New Board's brokers were "crushed" by the Panic of 1837 and the recession that followed, and it folded in 1848.

Curbstone brokers often traded stocks that were speculative in nature. With the discovery of oil in the latter half of the 19th century, even oil stocks entered into the curb market. By 1865, following the American Civil War, stocks in small industrial companies, such as iron and steel, textiles and chemicals were first sold by curbstone brokers. In August 1865, a reporter described the curb market in front of the new exchange building on Broad Street. "There were at least a thousand people on the sidewalk and street... Buyer and seller, speculator and investor, operator and spectator, agent and principal, met face to face, upon the curb and beneath the sweltering sun, opened their mouths wide and screamed all manner of seeming nonsense at each other".

The curb market grew further out of the Open Board of Brokers, previously in a building on New Street. Founded in part by former curbstone brokers, the Open Board of Stock Brokers was an early regional stock exchange established in 1864, which merged with the NYSE in 1869. After the Open Board joined the Consolidated Exchange, Open Board members specializing in unlisted stocks were left without "a roof over their heads and took to meeting casually in the course of the day in convenient lobbies in the [financial] district." The brokers were ousted by a number of buildings as their numbers grew, until they ended up in front of the Mills Building entrance on Broad Street.

=== 1890s-1907: Broad Street curb market ===
The curb market moved to Broad Street near Exchange Place in the 1890s. Around 1895, leading curb-broker Emanuel S. Mendels began promoting the idea of the market moving indoors, an idea which was not actively picked up for two more decades. Efforts to organize and standardize the market started early in the 20th century under Mendels and Carl H. Pforzheimer. After decades of involvement in the curb exchange, Mendels became the recognized "proctor" of the curb, and he alone would decide on the quotation lists. He also used his influence to throw out fraudulent stocks and dishonest brokers. In 1904, Mendels began to organize the curb, in an effort to cut down on swindling and other problems. Also that year, Mendels published the first annual directory of reliable brokers. In the mining boom of 1905 and 1906, the Curb market attracted some negative publicity for the "wholesale use of the Curb for swindling." Around late 1907, Mendels as Curb agent began devoting most of his time to keeping the Curb market "free of swindling stocks." As of 1907, Mendels gave the brokers rules "by right of seniority," but the curb brokers intentionally avoided organizing. According to the Times, this came from a general belief that if a curb exchange was organized, the exchange authorities would force members to sell their other exchange memberships.

The curb brokers had been kicked out of the Mills Building front by 1907, and had moved to the pavement outside the Blair Building where cabbies lined up. There they were given a "little domain of asphalt" fenced off by the police on Broad Street between Exchange Place and Beaver Street, after Police Commissioner McAddo took office. As of 1907, the curb market operated starting at 10'clock in the morning, each day except Sundays, until a gong at 3 o'clock. Orders for the purchase and sale of securities were shouted down from the windows of nearby brokerages, with the execution of the sale then shouted back up to the brokerage.

The noise caused by the curb market led to a number of attempts to shut it down. In August 1907, for example, a Wall Street lawyer sent an open letter to the newspapers and the police commissioner, begging for the New York Curb Market on Broad Street to be immediately abolished as a public nuisance. He argued the curb exchange served "no legitimate or beneficial purpose" and was a "gambling institution, pure and simple." He further cited laws relating to street use, arguing blocking the thoroughfare was illegal. The New York Times, reporting on the open letter, wrote that brokers informed of the letter "were not inclined to worry." The article described "their present ground on the broad asphalt in front of 40 Broad Street, south of the Exchange Place, is the first haven of which they have had anything like indisputed possession."

=== 1908-1910: Increased formalization ===
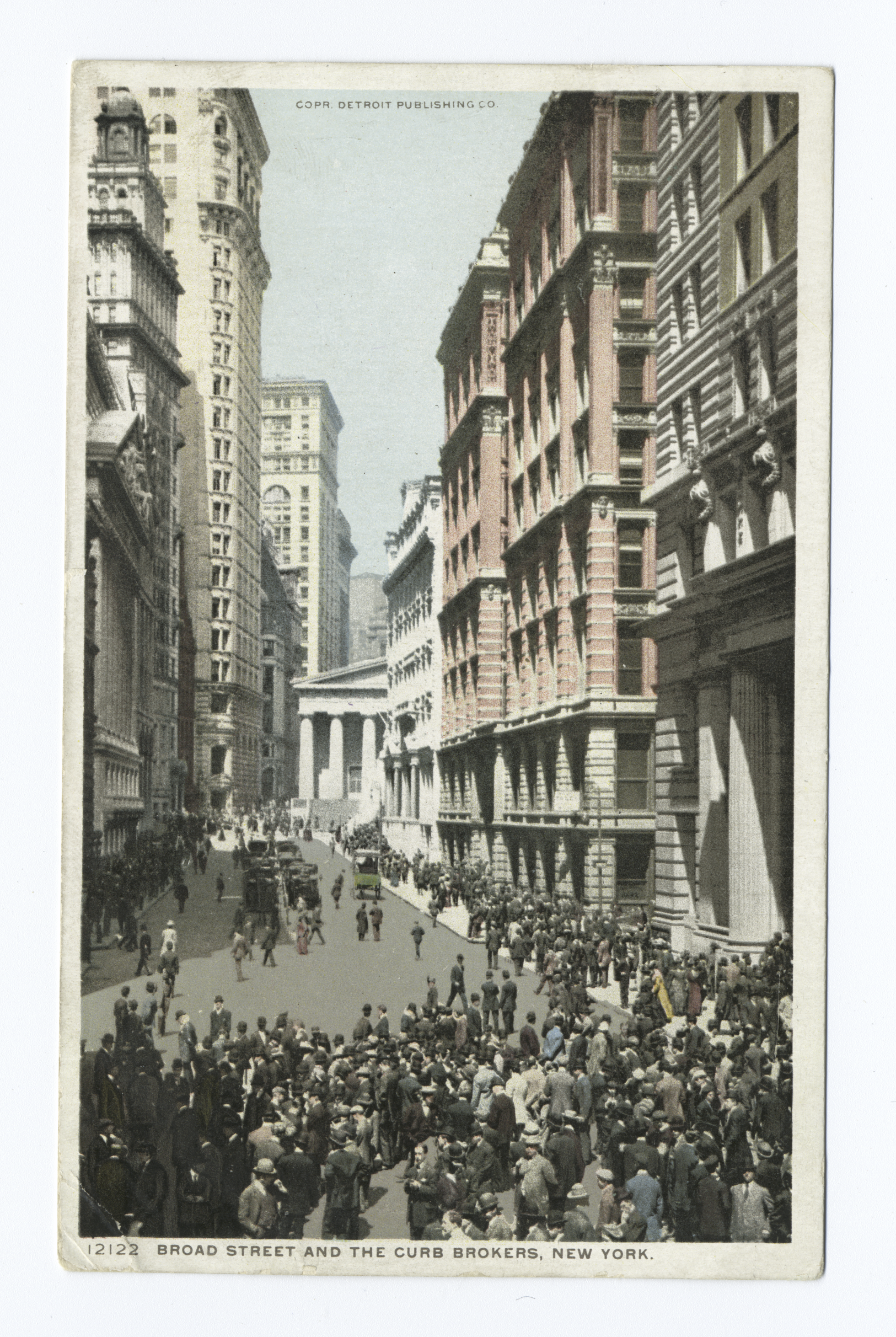
Broad Street and Curb Brokers, circa 1909.

In 1908, the New York Curb Market Agency was established, which developed appropriate trading rules for curbstone brokers. E. S. Mendels was a leading curbstone broker who organized the Curb Market Agency. As of February 1909, Mendels remained "Curb agent," meaning he was essentially the only authority figure in the unorganized curb market on Broad Street. On February 26, 1909, he gave a "very complete and satisfactory" testimony to the Wall Street Investigating Committee on how the curb brokers did business. He also gave testimony on their restrictions concerning new business, and how swindlers were dealt with. On November 10, 1909, Mendels issued a notice reading that "For the protection of the public, complaints made in writing against any corporation or individual using the New York Curb market, directly or indirectly, will be investigated by the agency and referred to the proper authorities for suitable action." At the time, the Curb market still had no official organization.

The curb exchange was for years at odds with the New York Stock Exchange (NYSE), or "Big Board," operating several buildings away at 18 Broad Street. Explained by The New York Times in 1910, the Big Board had always looked at the curb as "a trading place for 'cats and dogs.'" On April 1, 1910, however, when the NYSE abolished its "unlisted department," the NYSE stocks "made homeless by the abolition" were "refused domicile" by the curb brokers on Broad Street they turned to. The decision was made by the "Curb agent and his advisory board," who ruled via their control of the printed lists of transactions. They held a "solemn conclave" and decided that the NYSE stocks would not be added until they had complied with the "Curb list" of requirements. Among the refused stocks were J. H. Hoadley's International Power Company and T. F. Ryan's Metropolitan Street Railway Company. The Times wrote the Metropolitan Street Railway had experienced severe ups and downs on the NYSE, which "rival of worst of the manipulative scandals that the Curb has been trying to live down." In 1910, Mendels again testified before the Wall Street Investigating Committee on behalf of the curb brokers, when an attempt was made to dislodge them from Broad Street. The informal Curb Association formed in 1910 to weed out undesirables.

=== 1911: New York Curb Market Association ===
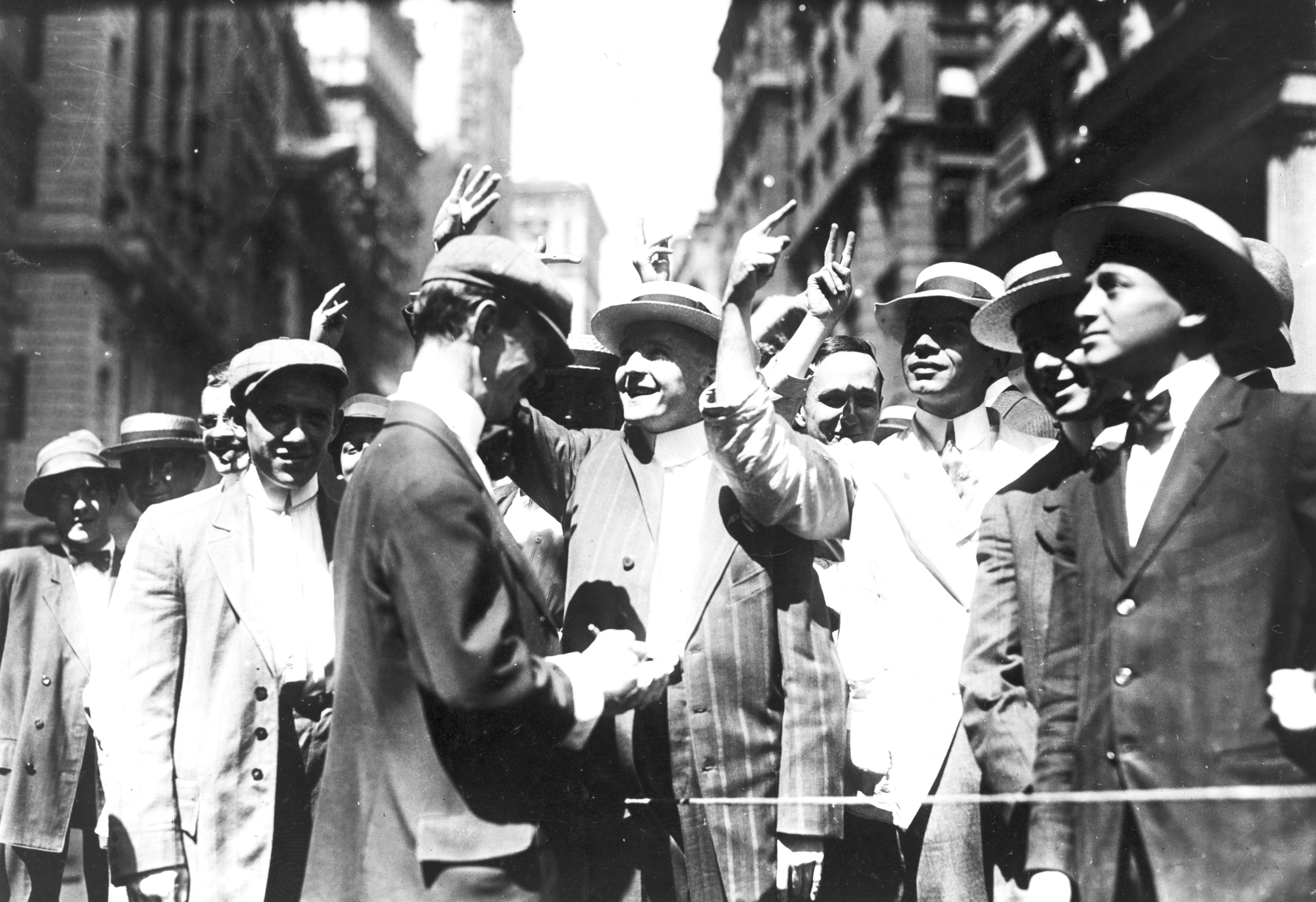
Stock trading on the New York Curb Association market on Broad Street circa 1916, with brokers and clients signalling from street to offices. Many members used flamboyant hand signals to conduct trades.

Based on a constitution drafted in 1911 to eliminate "irresponsible brokers and valueless stocks from the outside market," in 1911 the New York Curb Market Agency became the New York Curb Market, with offices in the Broad Exchange Building. In 1911, Mendels and his advisers drew up a constitution and formed the New York Curb Market Association, which can be considered as the first formal constitution of American Stock Exchange. On March 16, 1911, the Curb Association elected its first Board of Representatives. The board corresponded to the Governing Committee of the Stock Exchange and had the "task of keeping the outside market in order." Members included E. S. Mendels, J. L. McCormack, E. M. Williams, C. H. Pforzheimer, E. A. Chartrand, T. J. Newman, W. A. Titus, Franklink Leonard Jr., H. P. Armstrong, F. T. Ackermann, W. Content, Carl Rawley, R. Godwin, A. B. Sturges, and E. I. Connor. J.L. McCormack became the first Chairman of the Association

On October 8, 1916, The New York Times reported that leaders of the Curb Association favored a complete reorganization of trading in Broad Street, and were hastening efforts to get the "Curb under a roof" to allow for limited membership and fixed rules. To further its goals, the special curb committee pointed to recent violence on the curb among mining brokers, after fist fights broke out the week prior. A second fist fight among Broad Street brokers occurred on October 7, 1916, with the police warning that the next time the two combatants would be arrested. Curb Association chairman Edward Reid McCormick noted that the mining brokers had not been members of the Curb Association, leaving "no way for the Curb officers to inflict discipline." The fist-fights occurred over the lack of delivery of Emma Copper and Old Emma Leasing stock.

=== Official Curb Exchange building ===
In 1920, the New York Evening Post stated that the market presented a "motley, agitated mass of struggling, yelling, finger-wriggling humanity." In 1920, journalist Edwin C. Hill wrote that the curb exchange on lower Broad Street was a roaring, swirling whirlpool” that "tears control of a gold-mine from an unlucky operator, then pauses to auction a puppy-dog. It is like nothing else under the astonishing sky that is its only roof.” After a group of Curb brokers formed a real estate company to design a building, Starrett & Van Vleck designed the new exchange building on Greenwich Street in Lower Manhattan between Thames and Rector Streets, at 86 Trinity Place. The curbstone brokers moved indoors on June 27, 1921. By 1930, the Curb Exchange was the leading international stock market, "listing more foreign issues than all other U.S. securities markets combined." That year, the building's trading floor was doubled in size, with the entrance moved to 86 Trinity Place.

=== Later curb markets ===
The new San Francisco Curb Exchange started activities on January 2, 1928, using the unlisted securities formerly on the San Francisco Stock and Bond Exchange. Per the agreement behind the formation of the curb market, all members of the Stock and Bond Exchange held memberships in the new curb exchange. The Curb had an authorized 100 charter members, 67 from the Stock and Bond Exchange, and the remaining made available for sale.

On the second day of a strike by United Financial Employees, there was violence outside the Curb Exchange and NYSE on March 30, 1948. The incident occurred in the early morning, when picketers attempted to bar entrance to the NYSE building by lying on the sidewalk in front of the doors. 12 were hurt and 45 arrested in a battle between police and picketers, although the protests "failed to prevent the two security markets from operating at virtually normal rates." There was no violence on the Curb, although picketers and their sympathizers later lined outside the exchange that day, numbering around 1,200. At the time, Francis Adams Truslow was president of the Curb Exchange.

== Methods and culture ==
"Curb" or "outside" trading the involves brokers and dealers trading directly with each other in the street, for example near a stock exchange in a financial district. Historically, curbstone brokers often traded stocks that were speculative in nature. To get attention and be recognized on the curb in Manhattan, many members dressed in attention-grabbing clothes and used flamboyant hand signals to conduct trades.

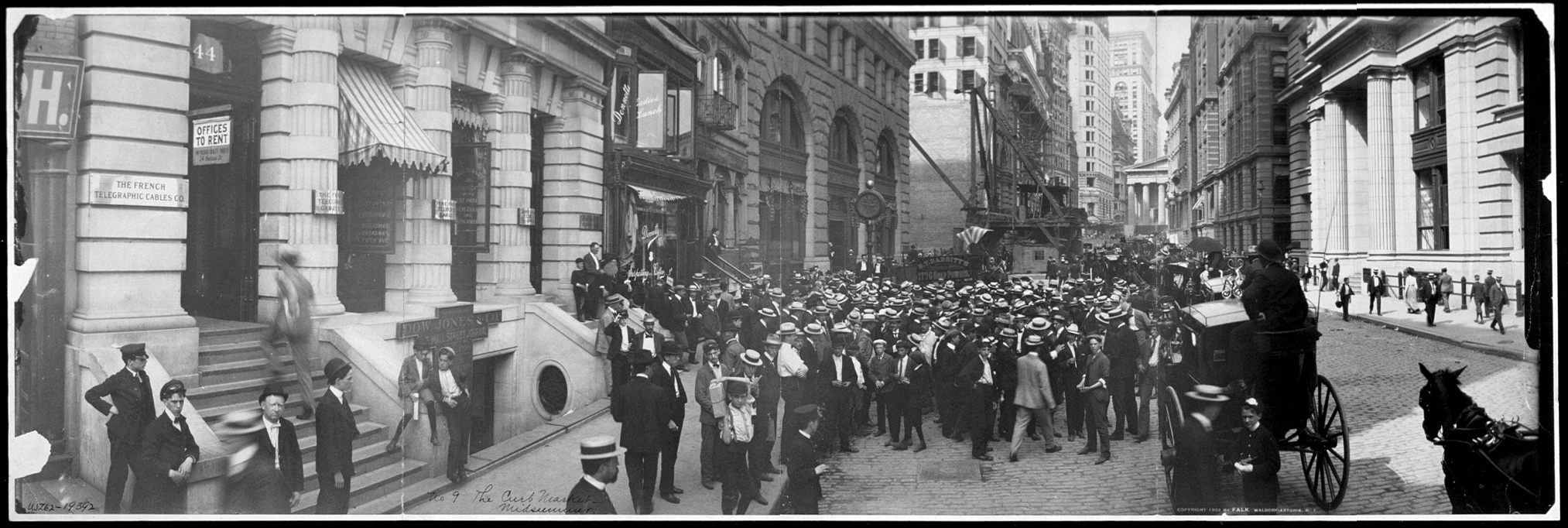
Curb market at Broad Street 1902. Wrote a local resident in 1907, each morning at 10 o'clock the "multitude" of "brokers, brokers' clerks, lemonade and provision vendors, messenger boys, 'lambs' awaiting slaughter, and numerous other attaches and camp followers of the noisy and disorderly throng breaks forth with a volley of discordant screams which rend the air for several blocks, and then bedlam reigns until the gong again sounds at 3 o'clock in the afternoon, to the confusion and discomfort of the whole surrounding neighborhood."

In August 1865, a reporter described the curb market in front of the new exchange building on Broad Street. "There were at least a thousand people on the sidewalk and street. Every man shouted; each wore his hat on the top of his head; nearly every man had a moustache, and it seemed to us if twenty bedlams could unite their most violent voiced roarings in one vast and deafening howl, they would fail to parallel the absolute maniacrison of the scene. Buyer and seller, speculator and investor, operator and spectator, agent and principal, met face to face, upon the curb and beneath the sweltering sun, opened their mouths wide and screamed all manner of seeming nonsense at each other, while their hats tipped far toward the small of their backs, their eyes strained fiercely and their arms waved wildly above their heads, from which rolled rivers of profuse perspiration."

In 1800s New York City the lay public (using street broker argot) and curbstone brokers referred to such brokers as "gutter-snipes".

== Notable curb markets ==
- New Board
- New York Curb Exchange
- Montreal Curb Market
- San Francisco Curb Exchange (1928–1938)
- Chicago Curb Exchange (1928–1938)

== See also ==
- Economy of New York City
- List of stock exchanges in the Americas
- List of stock exchange mergers in the Americas
- New Board
