= Carl Howard Pforzheimer Jr =

American banker

- Born: 1907
- Died: 1996 (aged 88–89)
- Education: Harvard College; Harvard Business School
- Occupations: Banker, philanthropist
- Organization(s): Carl H. Pforzheimer & Company
- Spouse: Carol Koehler
- Children: 2
- Family: Lily Oppenheimer; Carl Pforzheimer (father)

Carl Howard Pforzheimer Jr (1907–1996) was an American banker based in New York City. He was senior partner in Carl H. Pforzheimer & Company, and a benefactor of medicine, education and the arts.

== Early life and education ==
Pforzheimer was born and raised on the Upper East Side of Manhattan. He was the son of financier Carl H. Pforzheimer Sr (1879–1957), who was a founder of the American Stock Exchange. Carl Pforzheimer Jr. graduated in 1928 from Harvard College. In 1930 he graduated from Harvard Business School.

== Career ==
He was the senior partner in Carl H. Pforzheimer & Company, which was founded by his father in 1901. After his father died in 1957, Pforzheimer continued to focus the investment firm on oil and gas.

From 1958 to 1978 he was on the New York State Board of Regents, serving as vice chairman for the last years of his membership.

He served as a president or officer of the National Civic League, the National Association of State Boards of Education, the New York Public Library, and the Economic Development Corporation of New York City.

== Personal life and death ==
In 1931, he married Carol Koehler. The Pforzheimer House at Harvard University is named after them. They had a daughter, Nancy P. Aronson, and a son, Carl Howard Pforzheimer III. They lived in Purchase, New York, and Manhattan. He died at his home in Stuart, Florida, at the age of 89 in 1996.
