= New Board =

- Type: Curb-stone stock exchange
- Location: New York City, United States
- Founded: 1836
- Closed: 1848

The New Board was an organization of curb-stone brokers established in 1836 in New York City to compete with the New York Stock and Exchange Board. It folded in 1848.

== History ==
=== Formation ===
The first local rival of the New York Stock Exchange (NYSE), the New Board emerged in 1835 among the rough and tumble conditions of the very speculative curb-side trading during the down-turn in the market in general. The "curb" or "outside" trading the exchange used was a system in which "brokers and dealers traded directly with each other in the street near the exchange." This board grew out of a failed attempt of these brokers to work with the Wall Street board.

Bloomberg writes that it formed "in response to an economic boom and the formation of the first railroad corporations." According to historian Robert Sobel, the New Board was the first of a number of alternative set-ups that occurred in New York trading during periods of high volume, succeeding at first, setting up rival organizations and then succumbing during ensuing less bullish times.

=== Boom and decline ===
At first, the new organization was very successful, growing, while Wall Street was in a general decline. To compete, the NYSE quickly began offering a second daily opportunity to buy or sell securities. After its immediate success and strong rivalry, it declined, with most members going bankrupt within three years of its founding. Nevertheless, it remained larger than the older board until 1845. The New Board's brokers were "crushed" by the Panic of 1837 and the recession that followed. The exchange then faded before folding in 1848.

== See also ==
- Regional stock exchange
- List of former stock exchanges in the Americas
