= Carl Pforzheimer =

American banker (1879–1957)

Carl Howard Pforzheimer
- Born: 1879
- Died: April 4, 1957 (aged 77–78)
- Occupations: Banker, philanthropist, curbstone broker
- Known for: Helping organize the New York curb market on Broad Street, co-founding the American Stock Exchange,
- Spouse: Lily Oppenheimer Pforzheimer
- Children: Carl Howard Pforzheimer Jr

Carl Howard Pforzheimer (1879 – April 4, 1957) was an American banker and curbstone broker based in New York City.

He was a founder of the American Stock Exchange and amassed a large fortune on Wall Street as a specialist in Standard Oil stock.

An avid collector of rare books, he built up the Carl H. Pforzheimer Collection of Shelley and His Circle, which is now held at New York Public Library.

== Early life and education ==
Carl H. Pforzheimer was born to a Jewish family in 1879 in New York to Isaac and Mina Heyman Pforzheimer. He attended City College. His brothers Arthur and Walter worked together on Wall Street as young men, with Arthur later opening a rare book shop in 1933.

== Career ==
=== Founding his firm ===
Early in his career he was a $4 per week clerk on Wall Street. He later established his own firm, Carl H. Pforzheimer & Co. at the age of 23 in 1901. After the dissolution of Standard Oil Company in 1911, Pforzheimer was a "pioneer" in the trading of old Standard Oil shares and underwriting issues of companies that resulted from the break up of Standard Oil . After he formed Carl H. Pforzheimer & Co. he focused on the oil and gas industry, The NY Times writes that the firm was "instrumental in the underwriting of the securities of a number of oil companies at a time when Wall Street had developed little interest in the petroleum industry." He was president of the Petroleum and Trading Corporation.

=== Curb Association ===
Pforzheimer was a "charter member" of the Curb Exchange in New York, and his firm also belonged to the New York Stock Exchange. On March 16, 1911, the Curb Association elected its first Board of Representatives. The board corresponded to the Governing Committee of the Stock Exchange and had the "task of keeping the outside market in order." Members included Pforzheimer, E. S. Mendels, and others. In June 1914, he resigned from the board of representatives of the Curb Association. Pforzheimer and two other retirees had composed the Complaint Committee, had recently had their charges against Secretary Franklin Leonard dismissed by the full board. Leonard had offered to resign if the three complaint committee members resigned as well. Pforzheimer did not drop his membership in the organization.

As of 1922, his firm Carl H. Pforzheimer & Co. was located at 25 Broad St. In the Broad Exchange Building. Specializing in Standard Oil and miscellaneous securities, firm members included Carl Pforzheimer and his brothers Walter and Arthur.

=== Later positions ===
In February 1951 he was elected to the twenty-five person board of trustees at the New York Public Library, after serving as a member of the library committee since 1949. He also joined the library's finance committee. He was also a trustee and vice chairman of the Institute of the Public Administration. He helped form the Purchase Community, Inc., serving as its first treasurer for 25 years. He was also founding chairman of the Town of Harrison Finance and Advisory Committee.

He was a member of the advisory committee to the Commissioner of Public Welfare and of the Joint Committee on Public Assistance. He was a director of the Westchester County Association. He was chairman and treasurer of the Westchester County of Social Agencies, Inc., was on the Westchester Cancer Committee, and was a director with the Westchester Tuberculosis and Public Health Association.

From 1931 until 1935, he was chairman of the Westchester County Emergency Work Bureau. In 1935 he resigned from that position to become chairman of the Westchester County Commission on Government. From 1939 until 1942, he was the Westchester County Planning Commission's chairman. He was a governor of the White Plains Hospital, and a trustee of the United Hospital of Port Chester.

== Philanthropy ==
He was president of the Carl and Lily Pforzheimer Foundation Inc., a philanthropic organization, which is still active and continues his philanthropic legacy.

He has had several buildings named after him. In December 1956, Pforzheimer Hall at Horace Mann School in Riverdale of the Bronx was named for him, after he was chairman of the school's board for three decades. In 1955, the National Municipal League named their building after him, after he was treasurer of the organization for 35 years.

The Carl H. Pforzheimer University Professorship is Harvard’s highest faculty honor for scholars whose work crosses disciplinary boundaries. It was endowed by the Carl and Lily Pforzheimer Foundation in memory of Carl H. Pforzheimer Sr.

=== Book collection ===
Pforzheimer was an avid collector of rare books, collecting manuscripts and books over decades and housing them in an office building in Manhattan as the Pforzheimer Library, with access only allowed to specialized scholars. In 1923, he purchased a Gutenberg Bible for around $60,000. Other key works included the writings of Percy Bysshe Shelley. In 1940, he published "The Carl H. Pforzheimer Library of English Literature 1475-1700" as a three-volume catalogue. Over the next two decades, the publication was used as a reference book by collectors and scholars. In 1951, the New York Times called his library literature "considered one of the great rare book collections in private hands." Roger Stoddard, curator of rare books at Harvard College Library later called his collection "the greatest collection in private hands", including the first complete Bible in English and 1535 Coverdale Bible, and various Shakespeare plays. In 1987, his son Carl H. Pforzheimer Jr. and grandson Carl H. Pforzheimer III donated the Pforzheimer Collection of Shelly and His Circle to the New York Public Library, which included around 25,000 books, letters, manuscripts, and other related objects.

In 1986, a large portion of the New York-based Pforzheimer collection of English books and manuscripts was purchased for the University of Texas Harry Ransom Center, in "what book dealers said was the largest sale of rare books ever made." The transaction included the first book printed in the English language from 1475, as well as more than 1,100 books and 250 manuscripts from the years 1475 to 1700 collected by Pforzheimer.

The Ransom Center’s annual Carl and Lily Pforzheimer Lecture was established specifically to honor the library acquired in 1986.

== Personal life ==
On January 16, 1906 Pforzheimer married Lily Oppenheimer. Together they had a daughter, Jane Pforzheimer Long, and a son Carl Howard Pforzheimer Jr. He was an honorary member of the Elizabethan Club of Yale University, was a member of the Grolier Club, the Metropolitan Opera Club, the Lucullus Circle, the Newcomen Society of England, the Bankers Club, the City Midday Club, the Century Country Club, the Westchester Country Club, Quaker Ridge Golf Club, and Baton Rouge Country Club.

Carl H. and Walter Pforzheimer, both then working as New York brokers, purchased the old Dillingham mansion on Purchase Street, Purchase in New York in the fall of 1915, with sixty acres of land. Excluding weekends, the old farmhouse was not occupied by the Pforzheimer families that winter as improvements were made, with Carl and Walter summering at Port Chester. The Dillingham mansion burned down the morning of March 4, 1916, with total losses estimated at around $20,000. In 1922, Carl and his brother Walter had a falling-out that “drew a fault line” between their two families. Carl Pforzheimer would not see his nephew, the young Walter Pforzheimer, until 1955 when the elder Walter died.

His manor in Purchase had twenty rooms and was English-style on 400 acres. It adjoined the estate of Governor Lehman. As of 1936, Pforzheimer, his wife, his daughter, his son-in-law John Long, and two grandchildren were living in the manor. On July 14, 1936, lightning struck his Purchase mansion, causing around $100,000 in damages and injuring several firemen when a ceiling collapsed. Over 1,000 spectators reportedly gathered on Purchase Road 1,000 feet away to watch the spectacle. After the fire was quelled, Pforzheimer was heard remarking that he would call a meeting of the Purchase fire district, which he had previously helped organize with New York broker George Agents, the next day to organize a Purchase fire department.

His wife Lily died in Nantucket, Massachusetts on September 31, 1956 at the age of 71. By 1957, he was residing at Hidden Brook Farm in Purchase, New York. He died in April 1957 at his apartment at 820 Park Avenue, at the age of 78. His grandson, Carl H. Pforzheimer, III, as of 2017 continued to operate the Carl H. Pforzheimer & Co firm and The Carl and Lily Pforzheimer Foundation.

== See also ==
- Carl H. Pforzheimer University Professor
- Board of Regents of the University of the State of New York
