= Chicago Curb Exchange =

Defunct American stock exchange (1928–1938)

- Chicago Market
- Type: Curb exchange
- Location: Chicago, Illinois, United States
- Founded: February 6, 1928
- Closed: March 15, 1938

The Chicago Curb Exchange was an organized securities market and curb exchange located in Chicago, Illinois. It was alternately known as the Chicago Market. It operated from 1928 to 1938, facilitating trading in unlisted and smaller-company securities. It was liquidated in 1938.

== History ==
=== Founding and early activity ===
The Chicago Curb Exchange was incorporated in 1927. It was organized on February 6, 1928. Officers were elected and a constitution and by-laws adopted, although when trading in unlisted securities would begin and choice of quarters was undecided. Frank L. Schreiner of the Chicago Board of Trade was named president. John G. McCarthy was named treasurer, and James A. Cavanaugh was named secretary. The officers, along with E. D. Norton and E. J. Kuh Jr., formed the board of directors. It began doing business in July 1928 as "a trading place for securities of new companies and small concerns." August C. Babize served as its first president. Among others, the broker Adolph Kempner was a "moving spirit" in the curb's founding and later a president, from 1928 until 1929. The curb was created in competition with the Chicago Stock Exchange.

In 1928 and 1929 it was quite successful, and one session in 1929 saw a turnover of 175,800 shares. In 1929, peak volume was 6,645,635. On May 21, 1930, it was reported that the curb exchange was fighting the dual listing of stocks. 30 of the 200 members of the curb signed a petition asking for the resignation of the curb's three governors for being "active in the development of the securities market of the Chicago Board of Trade." It resulted from a controversy over the dual listing of the Walgreen Company and the Standard Oil Company of Indiana.

On October 14, 1931, the AP reported that the curb had "moved to protect investors" by adopting measures to facilitate company financing, while also protecting investors. At the time, Clarence G. Troup was president of the curb.

When the SEC formed, the curb applied for an exemption to new guidelines. Also, the curb requested the SEC investigate "alleged rigging of the market in stock of the Paducah Cooperage Company." In light of "startling information" developing in their investigation, on February 22, 1935, agents of the newly formed SEC in Chicago, on orders from Washington, announced that the SEC investigation into the Chicago Curb Exchange would be expanded. It would include a hearing on "the application of the exchange for exemption from the provisions of the SEC."

=== Decline and closure ===
Its deficit was $17,931 in 1934, $17,271 in 1935, and $6,329 in 1936. In 1936, profits for the curb were $23,358 and expenses were $29,597. On December 31, 1936, net assets were $74,652, in cash and government bonds. That year, the board of governors at the curb approved 14 new listings and four additional listings, with two memberships transferred, one for $1000 and one for $1,250. The exchange also received exemption in four new states: Texas, Kentucky, Oklahoma, and Kansas. By January 1937, there were 82 members. In 1937, the curb sold only 560,584 shares with $26,000 par value of bonds. As of February 1938, the exchange had 77 members, many of whom were also involved in other exchanges. It leased its trading quarters in the Postal Telegraph Building.

On February 4, 1938, members of the curb exchange voted to liquidate the exchange, and also voted to apply to the SEC to cancel their license as a national security exchange. 65 members voted to dissolve the organization, with no dissenting votes. The application cited its reasons as decline in membership, a four-year deficit, and a volume of listings and transactions insufficient to warrant continuing operation. The application was granted by the SEC on February 26, 1938. They were permitted to withdraw registration two days later. On March 7, trading on the curb became on a cash only basis. On 2 pm on March 15, 1938, trading permanently ceased and the board dissolved. The exchange ceased to exist with no ceremonies held.

== See also ==
- List of former stock exchanges in the Americas
- Chicago Stock Exchange
