= Paul Kolton =

American writer

- Born: Paul Komisaruk; June 1, 1923
- Died: October 27, 2010 (aged 87); Stamford, Connecticut
- Title: CEO of AMEX
- Term: 1972–1977
- Predecessor: Position created

Paul Kolton (June 1, 1923 – October 27, 2010) was an American reporter, mystery writer and public relations executive. He worked for the New York Stock Exchange before becoming president and later chairman of the American Stock Exchange, despite having no prior experience as a stockbroker. As chairman, Kolton oversaw the introduction of options trading.

== Early life and education ==
Born on June 1, 1923, as Paul Komisaruk, he later adopted the surname Kolton as a pen name when he began writing mystery books. Raised in Washington Heights, Manhattan, Kolton served in the United States Army during World War II. After completing his military service, he earned an undergraduate degree from the University of North Carolina at Chapel Hill in 1943.

== Career ==
=== Reporting and NYSE ===
After working as a reporter for The Journal of Commerce starting in 1946 and serving as an account executive at several advertising agencies, Kolton's first Wall Street job came in 1955 when he was hired by the public relations department at the New York Stock Exchange.

=== AMEX ===
He joined the American Stock Exchange in 1962 as its executive vice president. In 1971, he was appointed president the Amex, making him the first person to be selected from within the exchange to serve as its leader, succeeding Ralph S. Saul, who resigned in March 1971. In November 1972, Kolton was named the exchange's first CEO and the first salaried top executive. Although the American Stock Exchange was eventually purchased by the New York Stock Exchange (NYSE) in 2008, Kolton opposed the idea of a merger during his tenure, stating that "two independent, viable exchanges are much more likely to be responsive to new pressures and public needs than a single institution". Kolton announced in July 1977 that he would be stepping down from his position at the American Exchange in November of that year.

Following his departure from the American Stock Exchange, Kolton served as chair of an accounting standards advisory organization and as a corporate director.

== Personal life ==
A resident of Stamford, Connecticut, Kolton died there on October 27, 2010, at the age of 87, from lymphoma. He was survived by his wife, the former Edith Fromme, as well as a daughter, a son, five grandchildren and a great-grandson.
