= Emanuel S. Mendels =

American businessman and broker (1850–1911)

Emanuel S. Mendels Jr.
- Born: 1850; New Orleans, Louisiana, US
- Died: October 17, 1911 (aged 60–61); New York City, US
- Burial place: Woodlawn Cemetery
- Occupation: Curbstone broker
- Years active: 1870–1911
- Organization(s): E. S. Mendels, Jr., & Co.
- Known for: Organizing the American Curb Market (American Stock Exchange)
- Children: 5

Emanuel S. Mendels Jr. (1850–1911) was an American businessman and broker. He was a leading curbstone broker who organized the Curb Market Agency in 1908 that developed appropriate trading rules for curbstone brokers. Later he formed the New York Curb Market Association, which supervised curb trading in an effort to prevent fraud. The New York Times called him the "father of the curb, writing "he, perhaps more than any other man, worked for the elevation of business done on the [New York curb market]."

== Early life ==
Mendels was born in New Orleans, Louisiana, in 1850. His father, who had a small business was also active in Whig politics. After his parents moved to New Jersey, Mendels was employed at a brokerage house during the post war boom period.

== Career ==
=== Work as secretary and broker ===
Early in life, Mendels worked as a business secretary. He spent much of his time on the street doing business and became known as a "curb" broker, "one through whom all routine business of the market could be transacted." After four years of working in the brokerage firm, he left his position to be a full-time curbstone broker in Manhattan. He first became actively involved in the curb market in 1874. He became the recognized "proctor" of the curb, and he alone would decide on the quotation lists. He also used his influence to throw out fraudulent stocks and dishonest brokers. The curb market moved to Broad Street near Exchange Place in the 1890s. In 1904, Mendels began to actively attempt to organize the curb to reduce swindling and valueless stocks. Around 1895, Mendels began promoting the idea of the moving the market indoors which wouldn't be actively picked up for two more decades.

=== Work as Curb agent ===
In the mining boom of 1905 and 1906, the Curb market attracted some negative publicity for the "wholesale use of the Curb for swindling." Around late 1907, Mendels began devoting most of his time to keeping the Curb market "free of swindling stocks." In 1908, Mendels organized the Curb Market Agency that developed appropriate trading rules for curbstone brokers.

As of February 1909, Mendels was "Curb agent," meaning that he was essentially the only authority figure in the unorganized curb market on Broad Street. On February 26, 1909, he gave a "very complete and satisfactory" testimony to the Wall Street Investigating Committee on how the curb brokers conducted business under his authority. He also gave testimony on the restrictions concerning new business and explained the rules that dealt with swindlers. On November 10, 1909, Mendels issued a notice reading, "For the protection of the public, complaints made in writing against any corporation or individual using the New York Curb market, directly or indirectly, will be investigated by the agency and referred to the proper authorities for suitable action." At the time, the Curb market still had no official organization. In 1910, he again testified before the Wall Street Investigating Committee on behalf of the curb brokers when an attempt was made to remove them from doing business on Broad Street.

=== Curb Association formation ===
In 1911, Mendels and his advisers drew up a constitution and formed the New York Curb Market Agency, which can be considered as the first formal constitution of the American Stock Exchange, today known as the NYSE Amex Equities. On March 16, 1911, the Curb Association elected its first Board of Representatives. The board corresponded to the Governing Committee of the Stock Exchange and had the "task of keeping the outside market in order." Members included E. S. Mendels and fifteen others. Upon his death on October 17, 1911, The New York Times called him the "Father of the Curb." The quotation from the Times read, "he, perhaps more than any other man, worked for the elevation of business done on the Curb."

== Personal life ==
Mendels married Bertha Rothschild of Philadelphia. Their engagement was announced in April 1896 and they married on September 20, 1896. They had five children.

Mendels died on October 17, 1911 in New York City. Accounts of the illness vary; some indicate he had stomach cancer, while others that he became seriously ill from ptomaine poisoning while on a business trip to California.

Mendels was survived by his wife and children: Eugene E. Mendels, James S. Mendels, Mrs. Mary J. Betierris, William L. Mendels, and Walter A. B. Mendels. William and Walter carried on his business under the name E. S. Mendels, Jr. & Co.

== See also ==
- Wall Street reform
