= NYSE American =

Stock exchange in New York City

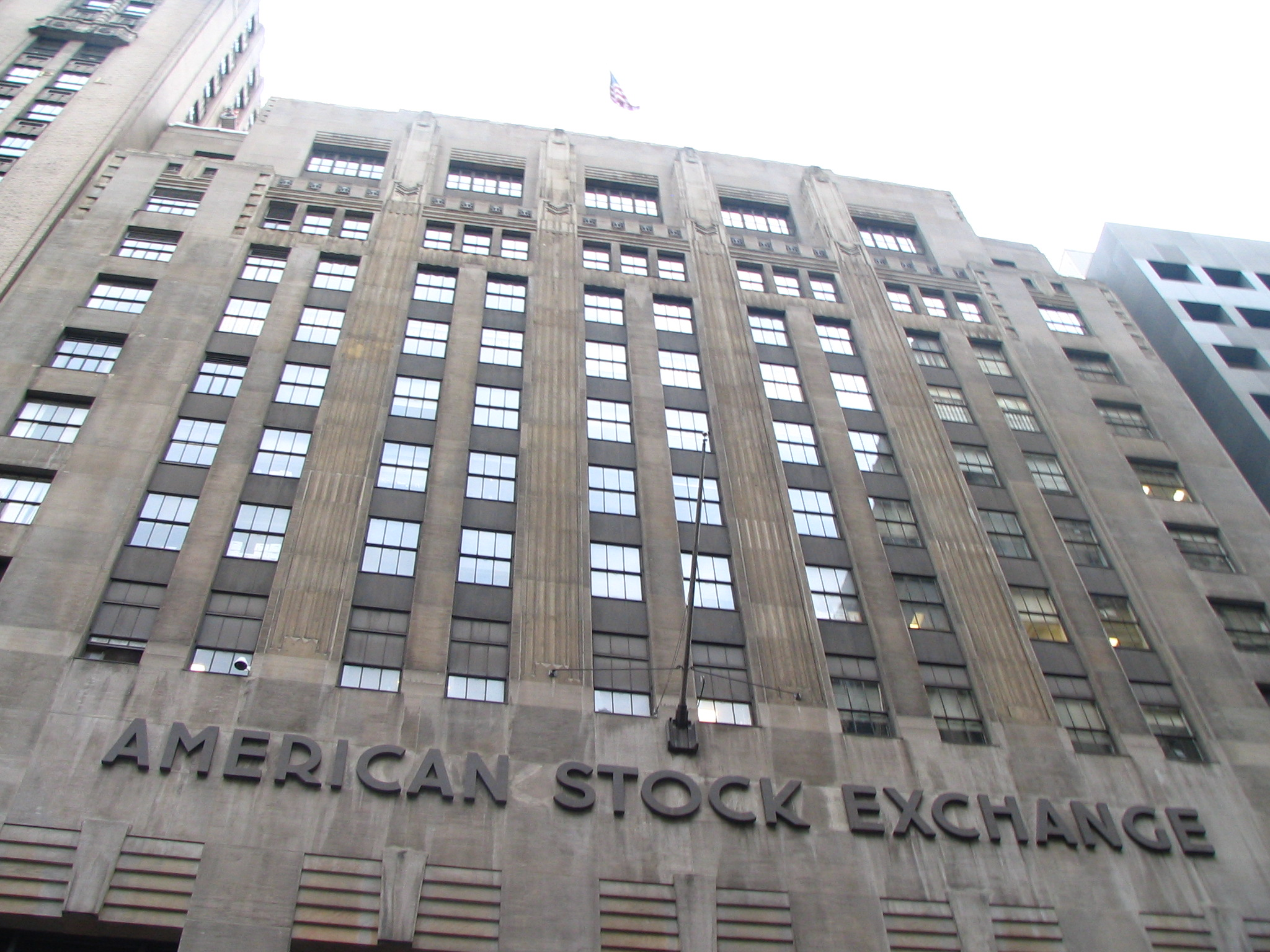
- The American Stock Exchange Building
- Type: Stock exchange
- Location: New York City, New York, United States
- Founded: 1908; 118 years ago (as New York Curb Market Agency)
- Owner: Intercontinental Exchange
- Currency: United States dollar
- Website: NYSE American

NYSE American, formerly known as the American Stock Exchange (AMEX), and more recently as NYSE MKT, is an American stock exchange situated in New York City. AMEX was previously a mutual organization, owned by its members. Until 1953, it was known as the New York Curb Exchange.

NYSE Euronext acquired AMEX on October 1, 2008, with AMEX integrated with the Alternext European small-cap exchange and renamed the NYSE Alternext U.S. In March 2009, NYSE Alternext U.S. was changed to NYSE Amex Equities. On May 10, 2012, NYSE Amex Equities changed its name to NYSE MKT LLC.

Following the SEC approval of competing stock exchange IEX in 2016, NYSE MKT rebranded as NYSE American and introduced a 350-microsecond delay in trading, referred to as a "speed bump", which is also present on the IEX.

== History ==
=== The Curb market ===
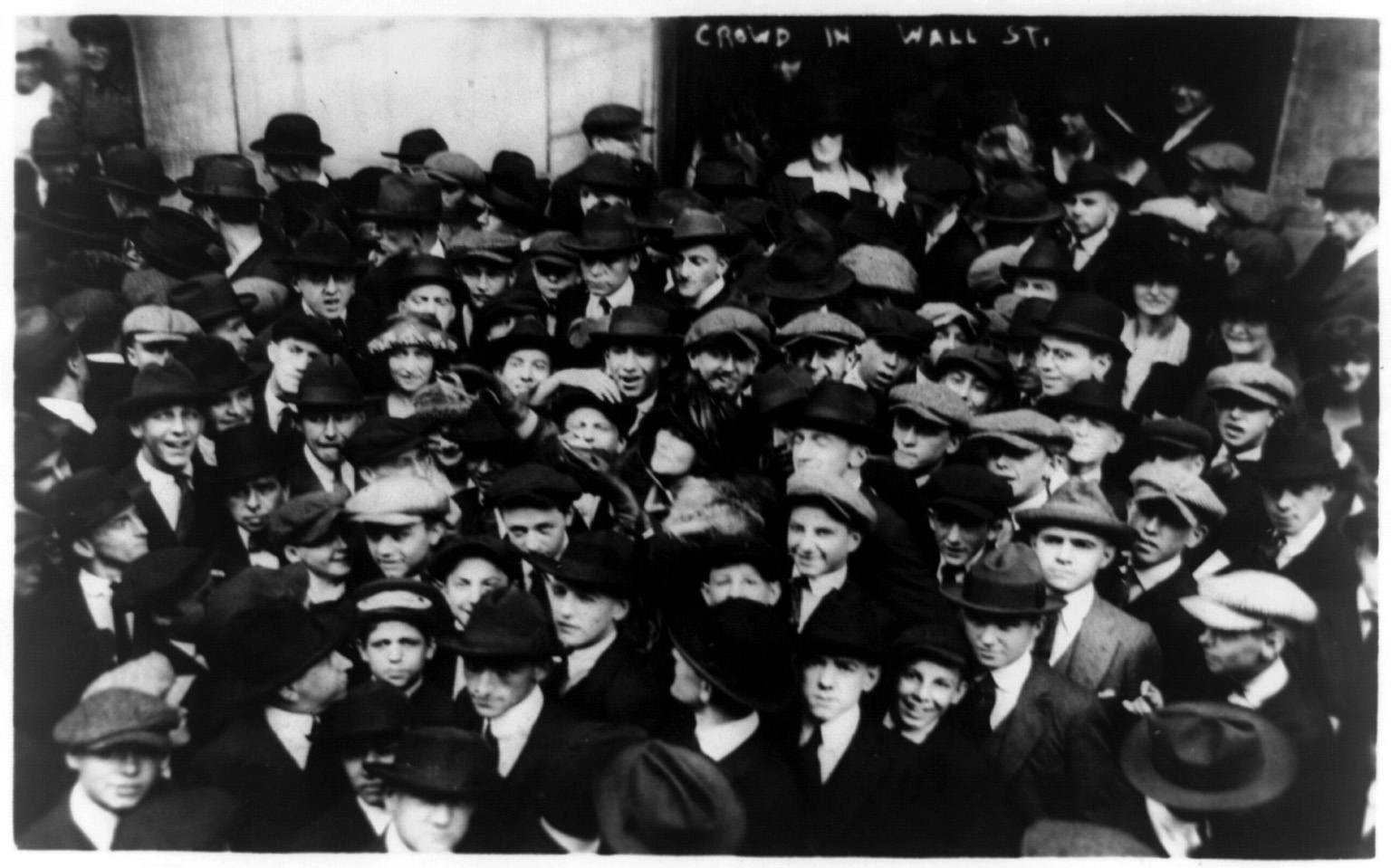
Curb brokers in Wall Street, New York City, 1920, a year before the trading was moved indoors. That year, journalist Edwin C. Hill described the curb trading on lower Broad Street as "a roaring, swirling whirlpool... like nothing else under the astonishing sky that is its only roof".

The exchange grew out of the loosely organized curb market of curbstone brokers on Broad Street in Manhattan. Efforts to organize and standardize the market started early in the 20th century under Emanuel S. Mendels and Carl H. Pforzheimer. The curb brokers had been kicked out of the Mills Building front by 1907, and had moved to the pavement outside the Blair Building where cabbies lined up. There they were given a "little domain of asphalt" fenced off by the police on Broad Street between Exchange Place and Beaver Street. As of 1907, the curb market operated starting at 10 AM, each day except Sundays, until a gong at 3 PM. Orders for the purchase and sale of securities were shouted down from the windows of nearby brokerages, with the execution of the sale then shouted back up to the brokerage.

=== Organizing and 'Curb list' ===
As of 1907, E. S. Mendels gave the brokers rules "by right of seniority", but the curb brokers intentionally avoided organizing. According to the Times, this came from a general belief that if a curb exchange was organized, the exchange authorities would force members to sell their other exchange memberships. However, in 1908 the New York Curb Market Agency was established, which developed appropriate trading rules for curbstone brokers, organized by Mendels. The informal Curb Association formed in 1910 to weed out undesirables. The curb exchange was for years at odds with the New York Stock Exchange (NYSE), or "Big Board", operating several buildings away. The New York Times reported in 1910 that the Big Board looked at the curb as "a trading place for 'cats and dogs.'" On April 1, 1910, however, when the NYSE abolished its unlisted department, the NYSE stocks "made homeless by the abolition" were "refused domicile" by the curb brokers on Broad Street until they had complied with the "Curb list" of requirements. In 1911, Mendels and his advisers drew up a constitution and formed the New York Curb Market Association, which can be considered the first formal constitution of American Stock Exchange.

=== 1920s-1940s: Move indoors ===
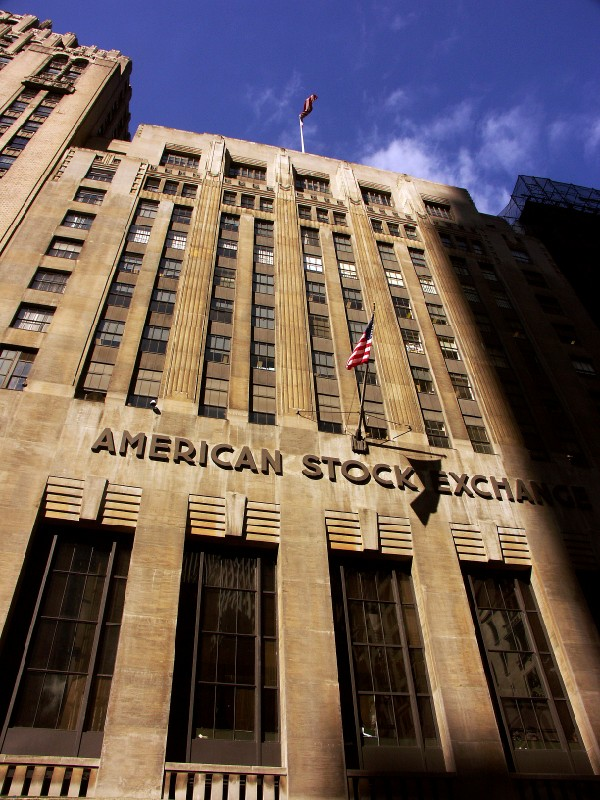
American Stock Exchange Building, constructed in 1921

In 1920, journalist Edwin C. Hill wrote that the curb exchange on lower Broad Street was a "roaring, swirling whirlpool" that "tears control of a gold-mine from an unlucky operator, and pauses to auction a puppy-dog. It is like nothing else under the astonished sky that is its only roof." After a group of Curb brokers formed a real estate company to design a building, Starrett & Van Vleck designed the new exchange building on Greenwich Street in Lower Manhattan between Thames and Rector, at 86 Trinity Place. It opened in 1921, and the curbstone brokers moved indoors on June 27, 1921. In 1929, the New York Curb Market changed its name to the New York Curb Exchange. The Curb Exchange soon became the leading international stock market, and according to historian Robert Sobel, "had more individual foreign issues on its list than [...] all other American securities markets combined".

Edward Reid McCormick was the first president of the New York Curb Market Association and is credited with moving the market indoors. George Rea was approached about the position of president of the New York Curb Exchange in 1939. He was unanimously elected as the first paid president in the history of the Curb Exchange. He was paid $25,000 per year (equivalent to $579,000 today) and held the position for three years before offering his resignation in 1942. He left the position having "done such a good job that there is virtually no need for a full-time successor".

=== Modernization as the American Stock Exchange ===
In 1953, the Curb Exchange was renamed the American Stock Exchange. The exchange was shaken by a scandal in 1961, and in 1962 began a reorganization. Its reputation recently damaged by charges of mismanagement, in 1962, the American Stock Exchange named Edwin Etherington its president. Writes CNN, he and executive vice president Paul Kolton were "tapped in 1962 to clean up and reinvigorate the scandal-plagued American Stock Exchange".

As of 1971, it was the second largest stock exchange in the United States. Paul Kolton succeeded Ralph S. Saul as AMEX president on June 17, 1971, making him the first person to be selected from within the exchange to serve as its leader, succeeding Ralph S. Saul, who announced his resignation in March 1971. In November 1972, Kolton was named as the exchange's first chief executive officer and its first salaried top executive. As chairman, Kolton oversaw the introduction of options trading. The exchange began trading listed call options in January 1975. Kolton opposed the idea of a merger with the New York Stock Exchange while he headed the exchange saying that "two independent, viable exchanges are much more likely to be responsive to new pressures and public needs than a single institution". Kolton announced in July 1977 that he would be leaving his position at the American Exchange in November of that year.

In 1977, Thomas Peterffy purchased a seat on the American Stock Exchange. Peterffy created a major stir among traders by introducing handheld computers onto the trading floor in the early 1980s.

In 1998, the National Association of Securities Dealers, then parent of the Nasdaq, merged with the American Stock Exchange, with the goal of modernizing technology and creating a "market of markets". One of the first initiatives was an electronic order book, allowing investors and professionals to execute orders from the trading floor using Nasdaq's electronic trading system. Ultimately, the merger was unsuccessful, and NASD decided to focus on its role as a regulator. In 2003, the NASD announced the sale of the American Stock Exchange to private-equity firm GTCR Golder Rauner LLC. The sale was completed in 2005.

=== Introducing ETFs ===
ETFs or exchange-traded funds had their genesis in 1989 with Index Participation Shares, an S&P 500 proxy that traded on the American Stock Exchange and the Philadelphia Stock Exchange. This product was short-lived after a lawsuit by the Chicago Mercantile Exchange was successful in stopping sales in the United States.

In 1990, a similar product, Toronto Index Participation Shares, which tracked the TSE 35 and later the TSE 100 indices, started trading on the Toronto Stock Exchange (TSE) in 1990. The popularity of these products led the American Stock Exchange to try to develop something that would satisfy regulations by the U.S. Securities and Exchange Commission.

Nathan Most and Steven Bloom, under the direction of Ivers Riley, designed and developed Standard & Poor's Depositary Receipts (NYSE Arca: SPY), which were introduced in January 1993. Known as SPDRs or "Spiders", the fund became the largest ETF in the world. In May 1995, State Street Global Advisors introduced the S&P 400 MidCap SPDRs (NYSE Arca: MDY).

Barclays, in conjunction with MSCI and Funds Distributor Inc., entered the market in 1996 with World Equity Benchmark Shares (WEBS), which became iShares MSCI Index Fund Shares. WEBS originally tracked 17 MSCI country indices managed by the funds' index provider, Morgan Stanley. WEBS were particularly innovative because they gave casual investors easy access to foreign markets. While SPDRs were organized as unit investment trusts, WEBS were set up as a mutual fund, the first of their kind.

In 1998, State Street Global Advisors introduced "Sector Spiders", separate ETFs for each of the sectors of the S&P 500 Index. Also in 1998, the "Dow Diamonds" (NYSE Arca: DIA) were introduced, tracking the Dow Jones Industrial Average. In 1999, the influential "cubes" (Nasdaq: QQQ), were launched, with the goal of replicate the price movement of the NASDAQ-100.

The iShares line was launched in early 2000. By 2005, it had a 44% market share of ETF assets under management. Barclays Global Investors was sold to BlackRock in 2009.

=== NYSE merger ===
As of 2003, AMEX was the only U.S. stock market to permit the transmission of buy and sell orders through hand signals.

In October 2008 NYSE Euronext completed acquisition of the AMEX for $260 million in stock. Before the closing of the acquisition, NYSE Euronext announced that the AMEX would be integrated with the Alternext European small-cap exchange and renamed the NYSE Alternext U.S. The American Stock Exchange merged with the New York Stock Exchange (NYSE Euronext) on October 1, 2008. Post merger, the Amex equities business was branded "NYSE Alternext US". As part of the re-branding exercise, NYSE Alternext US was re-branded as NYSE Amex Equities. On December 1, 2008, the Curb Exchange building at 86 Trinity Place was closed, and the Amex Equities trading floor was moved to the NYSE Trading floor at 11 Wall Street. 90 years after its 1921 opening, the old New York Curb Market building was empty but remained standing. In March 2009, NYSE Alternext U.S. was changed to NYSE Amex Equities. On May 10, 2012, NYSE Amex Equities changed its name to NYSE MKT LLC.

In June 2016, a competing stock exchange IEX (which operated with a 350-microsecond delay in trading), gained approval from the SEC, despite lobbying protests by the NYSE and other exchanges and trading firms. On July 24, 2017, the NYSE renamed NYSE MKT to NYSE American, and announced plans to introduce its own 350-microsecond "speed bump" in trading on the small and mid-cap company exchange.

== Products ==
- Intellidex
- Stocks
- Options
- Exchange-traded funds (ETFs)
- Structured Products
- Warrants

== Management ==
Past presidents of the American Stock Exchange include:

- John L. McCormack (1911–1914)
- Edward R. McCormick (1914–1923)
- John W. Curtis (1923–1925)
- David U. Page (1925–1928)
- William S. Muller (1928–1932)
- Howard C. Sykes (1932–1934)
- E. Burd Grubb (1934–1935)
- Fred C. Moffatt (1935–1939; 1942–1945)
- George P. Rea (1939–1942)
- Edwin Posner (1945–1947; January–September, 1962)
- Edward C. Werle (February–March, 1947)
- Francis Adams Truslow (1947–1951)
- Edward T. McCormick (1951–1961)
- Joseph F. Reilly (1961–1962)
- Edwin D. Etherington (1962–1966)
- Ralph S. Saul (1966–1971)
- Paul Kolton (1971–1973)
- Richard M. Burdge (1973–1977)
- Robert J. Birnbaum (1977–1986)
- Kenneth R. Leibler (1986–1990)

Past chairmen of the American Stock Exchange include:

- Clarence A. Bettman (1939–1941)
- Fred C. Moffatt (1941–1945)
- Edwin Posner (1945–1947; 1962–1965)
- Edward C. Werle (1947–1950)
- Mortimer Landsberg (1950–1951)
- John J. Mann (1951–1956)
- James R. Dyer (1956–1960)
- Joseph E. Reilly (1960–1962)
- David S. Jackson (1965–1968)
- Macrae Sykes (1968–1969)
- Frank C. Graham Jr. (1969–1973)
- Paul Kolton (1973–1978)
- Arthur Levitt Jr. (1978–1989)
- James R. Jones (1989–1993)
- Salvatore F. Sodano (1999–2005)

== Gallery ==
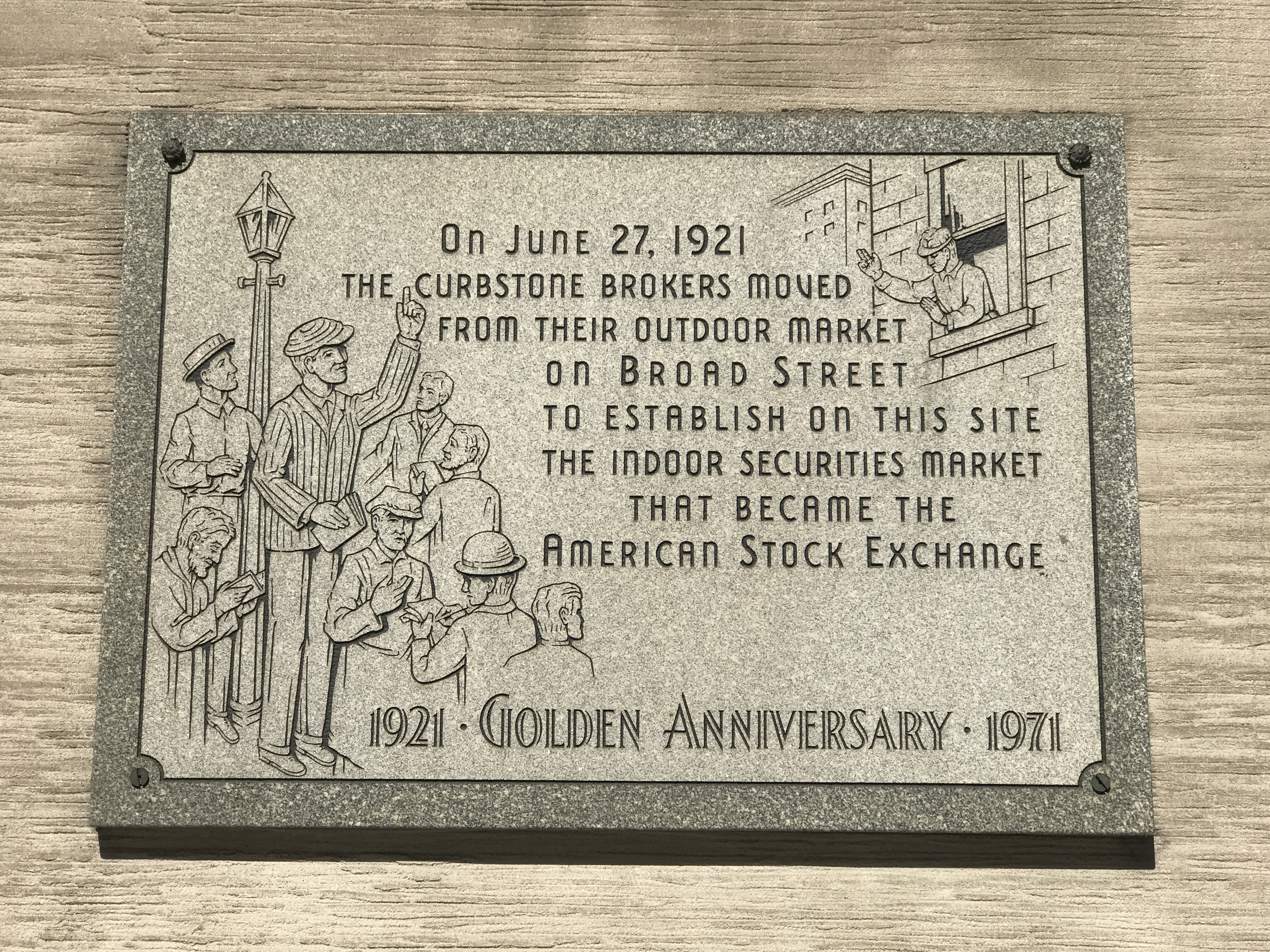
The text reads: "On June 27, 1921, the curbstone brokers moved from their outdoor Market on Broad Street to establish on this site the indoor securities market that became the American Stock Exchange."

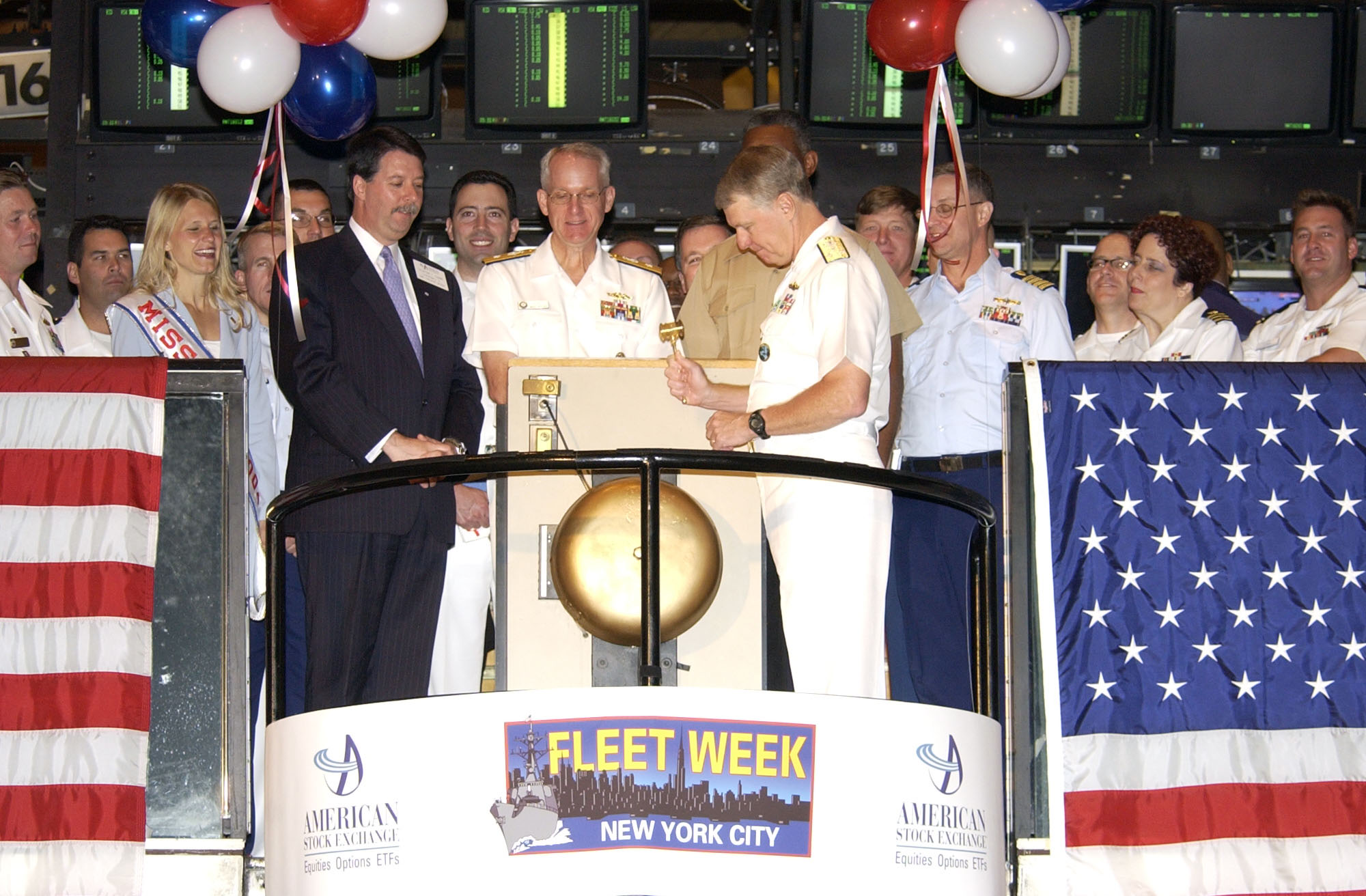
2004: Vice Adm. Gary Roughead, right, rings the opening bell at the American Stock Exchange, during the 17th Annual Fleet Week in New York

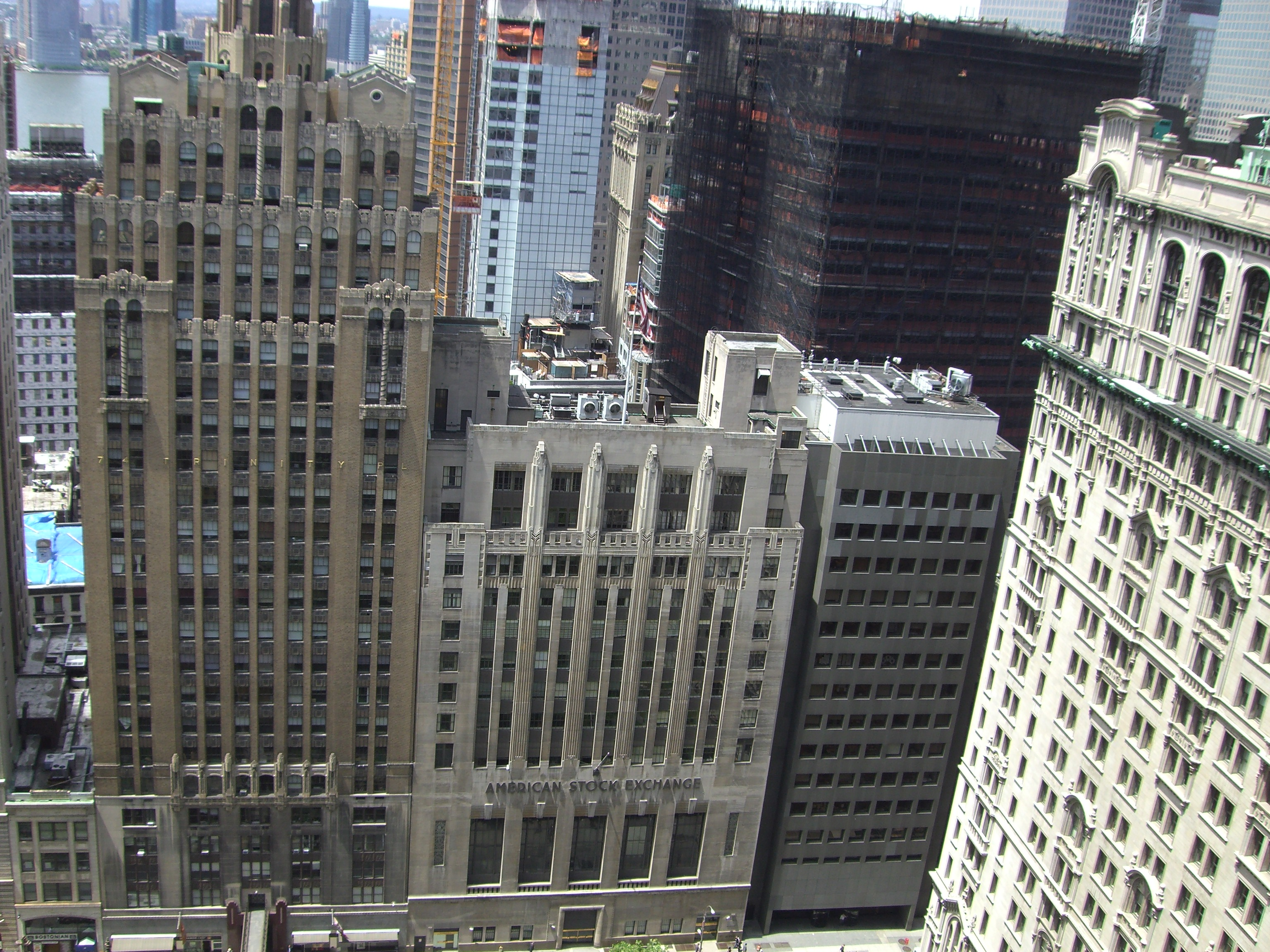
Old American Stock Exchange Building 2009

== See also ==
- NYSE Arca Major Market Index
- Microcap stock
- Economy of New York City
- List of stock exchanges in the Americas
- List of stock exchange mergers in the Americas
- Consolidated Tape System
- Hal S. Scott
- Michael J. Meehan
