= Bank of Daniel Meyer =

Historically important gold rush era bank

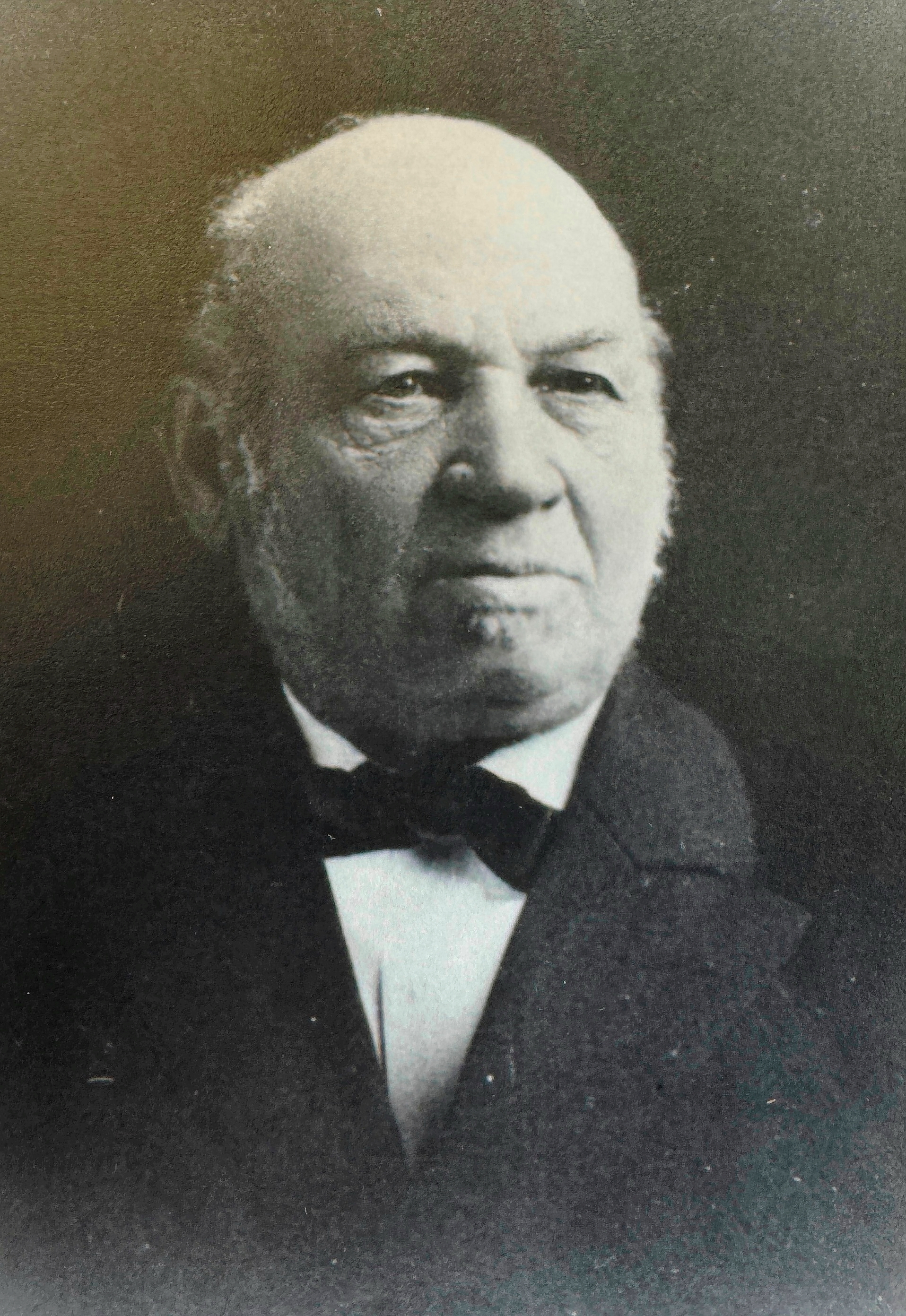
Daniel Meyer of Bank of Daniel Meyer, San Francisco, California.

The Bank of Daniel Meyer, a private bank, was founded in 1857 by German Jewish immigrant brothers Daniel and Jonas Meyer. Daniel Meyer was born in Sulzberg, Bavaria in 1824.

== Konigswarter banking connection ==
Daniel Meyer worked in Paris, France at a branch of Konigswarter (private family) Bank in the 1840s. Daniel was a great-grandson of Jonas Hirsch Konigswarter, famous European patriarch to the Konigswarter family line from 1740 to 1805, with a legacy of five sons who established successful banking institutions throughout Europe, which were later dismantled in World War II by the German Nazi regime.

Jonas von Königswarter 1807 to 1871 was the most renowned member of the family, having been elevated by royalty to the hereditary status of knight and of baron. He founded the banking business Königswarter & Todesco, became a controller of in 1833 and director of the Austrian National Bank Oesterreichische Nationalbank#Geschichte in 1850, and was involved with the founding of the Rothschilds' Creditanstalt (1855): the largest Austrian bank, which was particularly concerned with railway financing. Jonas was on the board of directors of the Austrian Credit Institute AG Österreichisches Credit-Institut, the Emperor Ferdinand Northern Railway, the Bohemian Western Railway and other lines, and promoted the expansion of the Austrian railway network. He was considered one of the most important Viennese financiers of the mid 19th Century, and was a prominent figure on the stock exchange. His palace in Vienna (Palais Konigswarter: see link below in the following paragraph) was a sought-after meeting place for politics and business. Jonas donated large sums to charity and rendered outstanding services to the Viennese Jewish Community, of which he was president since 1867.

Leopold Konigswarter (1800 to 1863), son of Simon Konigswarter, was head of the Paris, France branch of the family bank. He formed Belgium's first private railway company and built the Antwerp to Ghent railway line, which opened in 1847, achieving better financials than any previous Belgium railway.

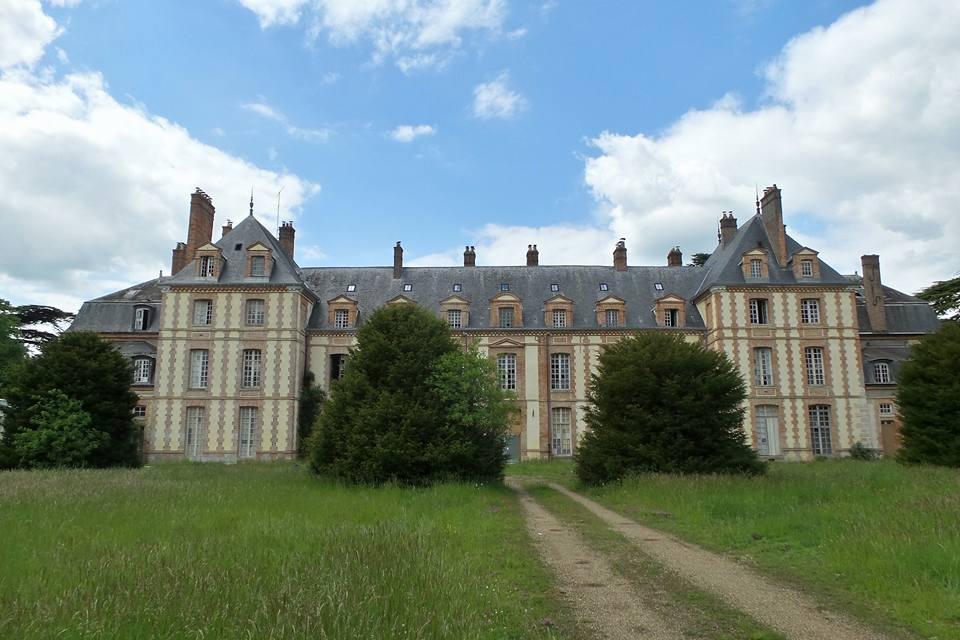
Château d'Abondant

At least two famous Konigswarter residences with historical-protection status survive as of 2026, including Jonas Konigswarter's recently renovated 19th century Palais Königswarter in Vienna, and the recently renovated 17th Century Château d'Abondant in Abondant, France owned by Jules de Koenigswarter. The famous 1740s salon room interior of the Chateau d'Abondant was sold to The Louvre, dismantled and reassembled in its entirely, and placed on display at the Louvre museum in Paris, France as of 2026.

Pannonica de Koenigswarter contributed greatly to the Konigswarter name in 20th Century New York culture, becoming the patron of many jazz greats such as Thelonious Monk, Charlie Parker, and others. De Konigswarter wrote two books on jazz musicians which include her own interviews and her own photographs of hundreds of jazz musicians ("Three Wishes: An Intimate Look at Jazz Greats", and "The Eye of Nica"). She is the subject of a TV movie The Jazz Baroness. Thelonious Monk's song "Pannonica", dedicated to de Koenigswarter, is now a widely covered standard jazz tune, and many other tunes were written by jazz greats as tributes to de Koenigswarter, such as "Nica's Dream" and "Nica's Tempo".

== New York and San Francisco ==
Daniel Meyer arrived in New York, USA in the later 1840s (Hoexter and Hoexter reference). The Meyer brothers Daniel and Jonas arrived in California separately during the gold rush period in 1851–1852, via the Isthmus of Panama, after having been tobacco merchants in the East Coast, USA. They continued to work as tobacco merchants in San Francisco, California. The Federal Government put an embargo on trade with the Confederacy during the American Civil War, which made the brothers' inventory of tobacco quite valuable. They turned this inventory into a large profit from which they started their banking operation (Hoexter and Hoexter reference).

Three additional brothers Mathias Meyer, Abraham Meyer, and Moritz Meyer, as well as nephew Moritz Scheeline, eventually joined this banking business in various capacities, though the company remained in Daniel Meyer's name only.

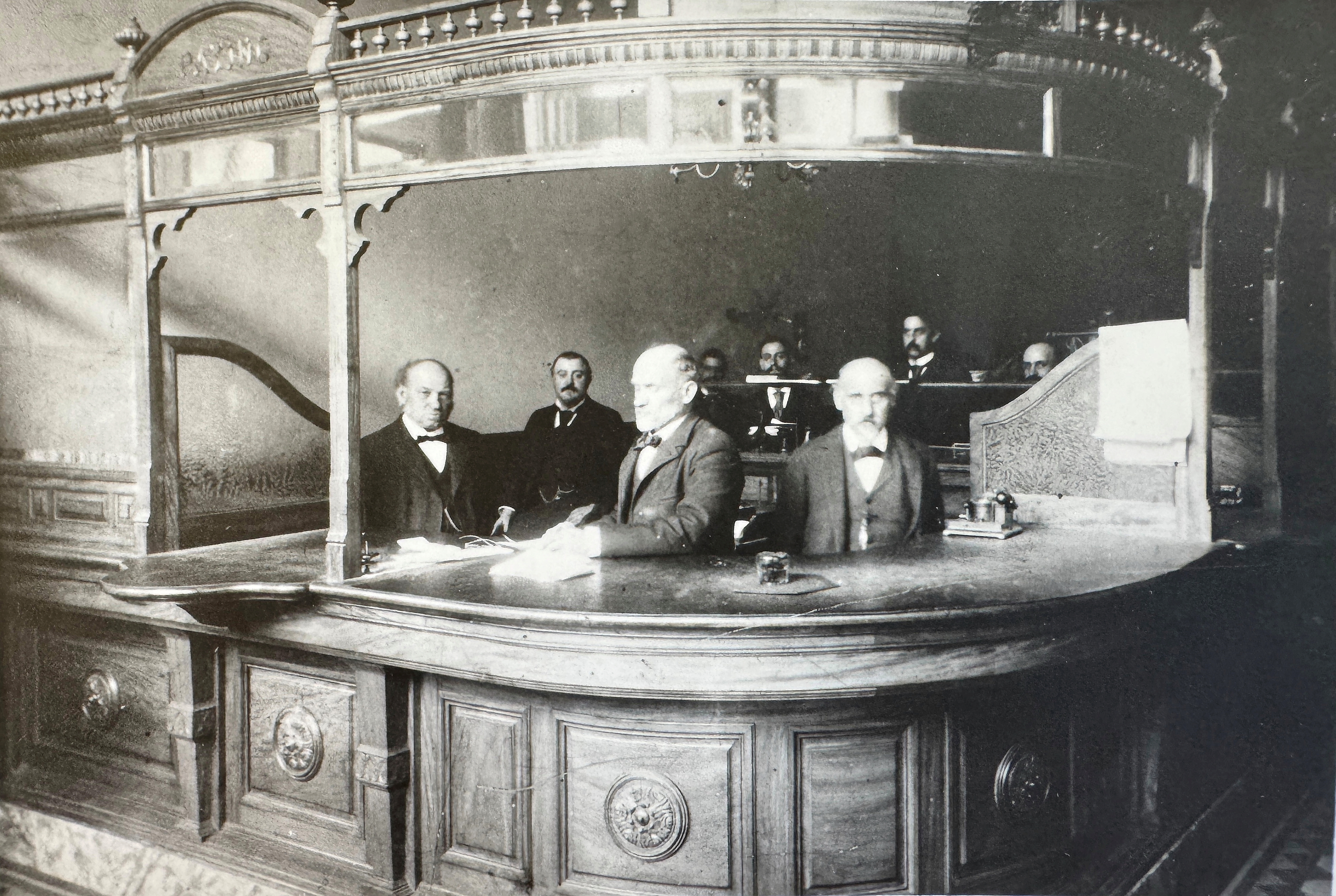
Front, left to right: Daniel Meyer, Moritz Meyer, Mathias Meyer

The Bank of Daniel Meyer was located at 212-214 Pine Street, San Francisco, CA.

== Historically important monetary support and oversight by bank of Daniel Meyer ==
(1) Important support to fellow German Jewish immigrant Mr. August Schilling: founder of the Schilling spice company, which operated out of San Francisco, California, from 1881, until 1947, when it was sold to McCormick Co., Inc., another large spice production firm. Meyer incorporated American Cream Tartar Company and American Tartar Company as a director in 1899, along with A. Schilling and G. Volkmann of The A. Schilling Co.

(2) Bank of Daniel Meyer is credited with having provided a very large loan at 9% interest to the City of Bakersfield, CA, after the downtown area of wooden buildings was destroyed in the big 1889 fire. Insurance paid off only a fraction of the amount needed to rebuild the town at the time, and other banks and insurance companies refused to provide the remaining needed funds. The townspeople of Bakersfield approached Bank of Daniel Meyer to request additional funding for the rebuild.

(3) Daniel Meyer was one of the organizers of the Bank of Central California in Fresno, California. Through Bank of Central California, Meyer financed the construction of the Alta, the Modesto, and the Turlock irrigation systems in the California Central Valley area, which allowed for widespread wine grape production.

(4) Bank of Daniel Meyer funded the Marysville, CA flood control project fully 100% in 1895, underwriting the voter-approved bonds issued by the city with a $40,000 check handed to the Mayor of Marysville Mr. W.T. Ellis.

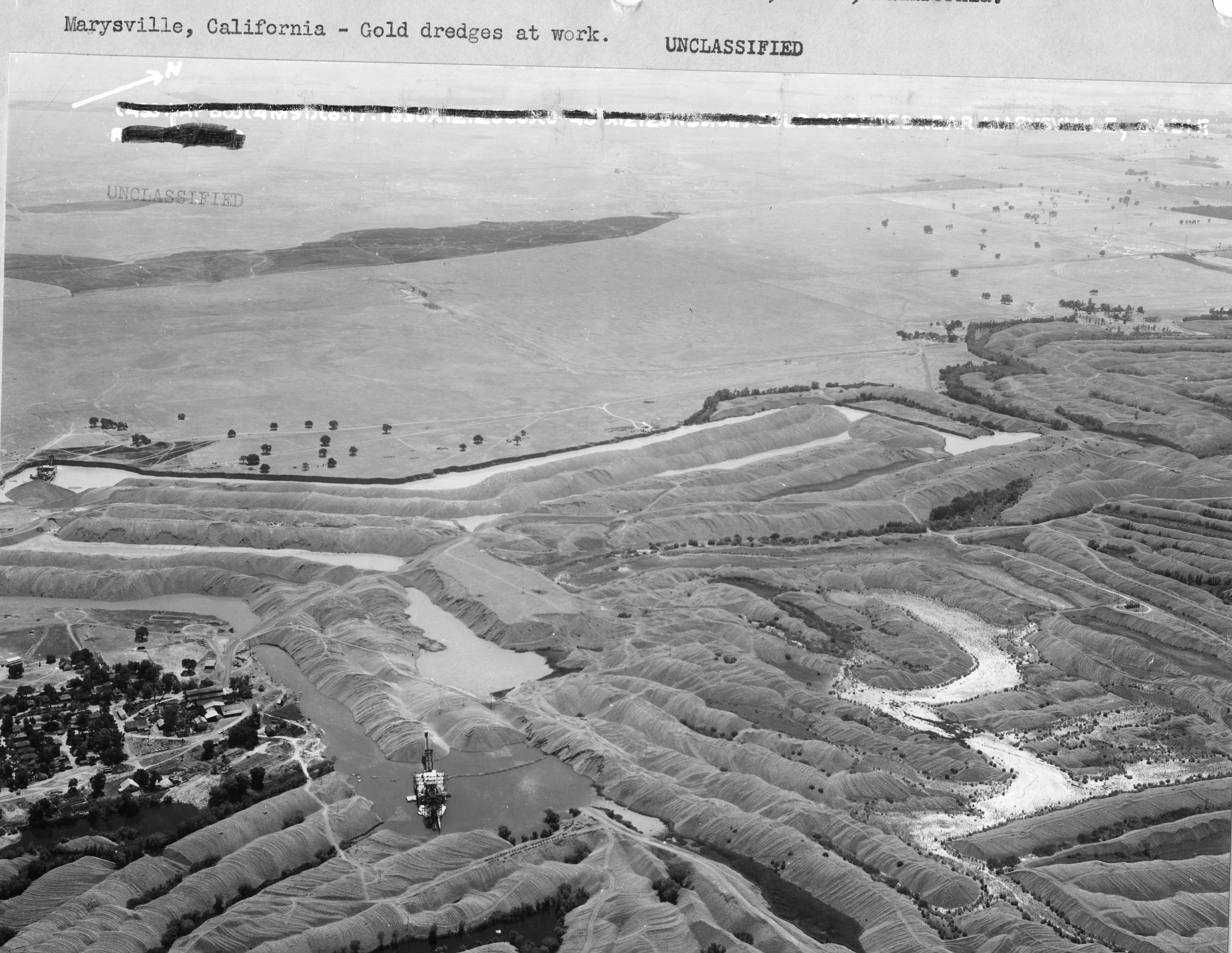
California - Mare Island Navy through Mission Creek - NARA - 23934535

Marysville, California was the site of a major gold discovery at the beginning of the California gold rush very early on in 1848. A large portion of the City prior to its incorporation was actually a ranch land unit owned by John Sutter, owner of the famed Sutter's Mill gold discovery site 50 or 60 miles south of Marysville, at Coloma, California, which is 36 miles north of present-day Sacramento, California, where gold was first discovered in California in January of that same year. The Marysville location at the confluence of the Yuba and Feather rivers meant that all-out gold mining in the rivers was occurring in various areas surrounding the town itself, soon after the initial 1848 gold discoveries in Coloma and Marysville, causing mining spoils to eventually build up the actual elevations of the riverbeds themselves (see image at right), which forced river water to flow into the city, exacerbating the flooding problem during winter rains (elevated river water elevations) and during spring snowmelt runoff through the river systems.

The rapidly growing flat-ground gold mining town of Marysville was the 9th City in California to incorporate in 1851. The city was and is The Yuba County seat, and was an important site from which miners embarked and disembarked riverboats to and from gold mining areas throughout California. From the 1850s through 1870s, the City proceeded with flood control projects by building up innovative "ring levees" surrounding the town, in an attempt to stop or slow river water flooding the lowland town itself. The levees contained gravity gates through which rainwater in the town could flow via gravity toward the lowest elevation point, which was the confluence of the Yuba and Feather rivers, but this system did not work when the elevation of the river water was greater in height than the water flowing from the town through the levee gate(s): a situation which commonly occurred as noted above, during periods of heavy winter rainfall and spring season snowmelt runoff which elevated the river water elevation considerably, with the mining tailings in the rivers exacerbating the problem by raising the elevation of the riverbeds.

Marysville voters in 1895 approved a City-proposed flood control project which was laid out as a $40,000 bond issue, printed out as four hundred (400) bonds of $100 each, maturing after 10 years, with 5% annual interest, in the hopes that local citizens would purchase them. However, after the voter approval of the bonds, the City did not make an effort to sell the bonds directly to the Marysville citizens, and the local Sacramento, CA area banks refused to underwrite the bonds, with Mayor Ellis stuck in a conundrum of how to proceed. Mayor Ellis was instructed "off the record" to sell the bonds to a bank in San Francisco, CA, and quickly went off to visit Mr. Daniel Meyer of Bank of Daniel Meyer, who the Mayor was familiar with by name as "a well-known old Jewish banker".

During their meeting in San Francisco, Mayor Ellis in his memoir relates how Meyer berated him for having issued four-hundred $100 bonds in a huge bundle, which would necessitate Meyer to physically clip off every single "coupon" from each and every bond (in the 19th century, bonds were a form of convertible money, and "coupons" attached to the edge of the bond were clipped off with scissors and sent to the bond issuer each year or at each interest bearing period of the year, at which time the bond issuer (in this case City of Marysville) would send the interest payment (5%) to the bond underwriter. Bonds thus had to be kept in a safe or vault to prevent theft, as the bond paper itself was a form of money. Meyer went on and on for a very long period of time, exclaiming to the Mayor in his German accent "...do you tink I haf the time to spare to cut coupons off of hundred dollar bonds, do you tink I want to wear out scissors cutting off coupons on hundred dollar bonds, you damn young fool!" (etc.).

Daniel Meyer finally appeared poised to underwrite the bonds, but suddenly noted to Mayor Ellis that one the one hand, the bonds had Mayor Ellis's name printed on them, but on the other hand, the bonds were signed with the hand-written signature of Mr. Justus Greeley, the Marysville City Treasurer, which was a cause for some concern, as the names did not match. The two debated back and forth for some time, and Meyer finally said he would underwrite the bonds if his attorney upstairs in the Daniel Meyer building, a "Mr. Silverstein", would approve the bonds as currently written.

For a half hour, Mayor Ellis sweated it out downstairs, waiting for Daniel Meyer's attorney to approve the bonds. When there was no response, Ellis asked if he could go upstairs and meet with Mr. Silverstein. Meyer was fine with that. Ellis went upstairs and asked Mr. Silverstein if everything was in order. Finally, Ellis said "now Mr. Silverstein, there can be no question about those bonds being all right, I feel sure you haven't found anything to the contrary; now I feel that I have been the cause of taking up a lot of your time and feel that I should reimburse you". With that, Ellis handed Attorney Silverstein a $20 gold piece (U.S. double eagle, the equivalent of roughly $800 in 2026 dollars). Mr. Silverstein slipped the gold piece into his pocket and went with Mayor Ellis back downstairs to meet with Daniel Meyer. Mr. Silverstein told Daniel Meyer that he was "quite sure the bonds were all right", and with some reluctance, Meyer wrote out a check for Mayor Ellis for $40,000, underwriting the entire bond issuance.

The next day, September 17, 1895, Mayor Ellis arrived back in Marysville, and handed the check to the City Treasurer Justus Greeley "with a sigh of relief". The local Marysville Daily Appeal newspaper reported Sept 17th "Money for Bonds....Mayor Ellis returned from San Francisco last night. He carried in his inside pocket a check signed by Daniel Meyer for $40,000." (accounted for inflation, equivalent to roughly 1.6 million U.S. dollars as of 2026).

Work on the flood control project commenced that year, and involved major land grading, including filling of depressions, levee building, and slough, ditch, and water conveyance system construction. High flow rate water pump construction was performed at the low elevation point of the city, which as noted above was at the confluence of the Yuba and Feather rivers. The innovative pumps were impeller-driven, pumping at a rate of up to 18,265 gallons per minute (GPM), and pumped collected storm water from a large cistern near the pumps on the City side of the levee, up and over the levee itself, and out to the rivers, thereby allowing for removal of stormwater during periods of high river water elevation. The natural gravity-drain flaps in the levee which functioned to allow water flow out through the levee into the river, during periods of low river water elevation, would have been temporarily shut closed when the water pumps were turned on, to prevent backflow of river water back through the ring levee toward the city.

On April 4, 1990, Rotary Club of Marysville installed a historical marker brass plaque on the pump station, which discusses the history of the 1895 flood control project. As of 2026, the historical pumps and brass marker are currently located just east of the corner of "D" and 11th Streets, Marysville, CA, adjacent to Lake Ellis: a body of water which constitutes a park within the City limits that was named after long-time City of Marysville Mayor W.T. Ellis.

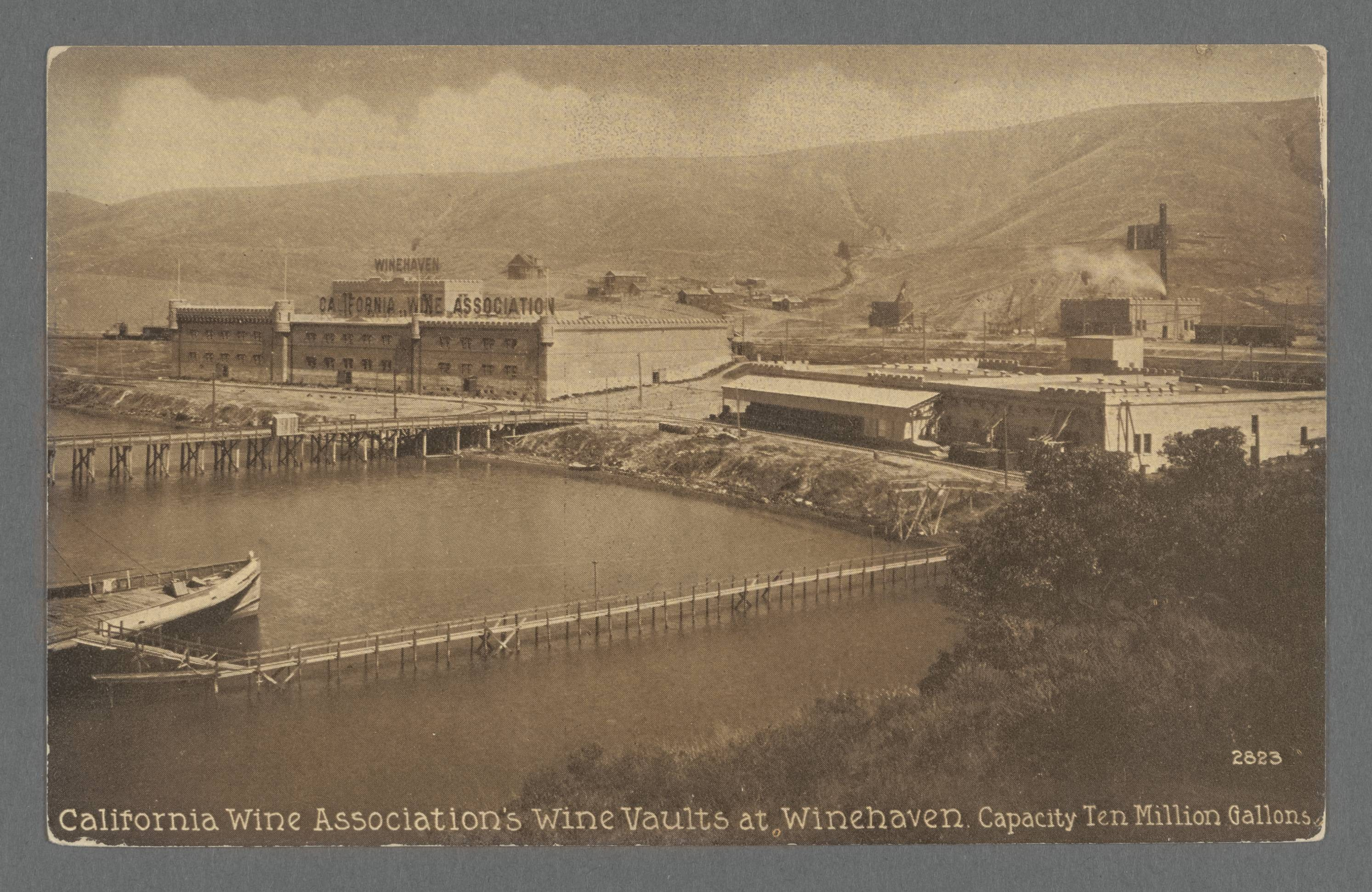
Winehaven image circa 1915-1920. UC Berkeley, Bancroft Library. BANC PIC 2017.021:S3B.2823

(5) Daniel Meyer was an elected director of the California Wine Association (CWA): a wide-spreading consortium of wine merchants, wine producers, wine grape growers, and related businesses owned by or controlled by CWA. CWA eventually held virtual monopoly control over 80% or more of California wine production, trade, and sales out of a unique facility called Winehaven, California (built in 1906 after the San Francisco earthquake and fire which destroyed a large percentage of CWA's wine holdings), known as the world's largest winery for over a decade until it was shut down in 1920 at the start of the USA prohibition period that banned alcohol sales. Winehaven is listed on the National Register of Historic Places listings in Contra Costa County, California.

On New Year's Day 1901, an informal agreement was announced between prominent San Francisco bankers and wine producers that included the California Wine Association, Isaias Hellman of Nevada National Bank, Antoine Borel banker, Bank of Daniel Meyer, Italian Swiss Colony (wine producer) of Asti, CA, Lachman & Jacobi wine merchants at Brannan Street San Francisco with a sherry-holding tank of 80,000 gallons, and C. Schilling & Co. wine producer also at Brannan Street San Francisco with a cellar capacity of 1,750,000 gallons, to better regulate California wine trade (L.A. Herald reference above).

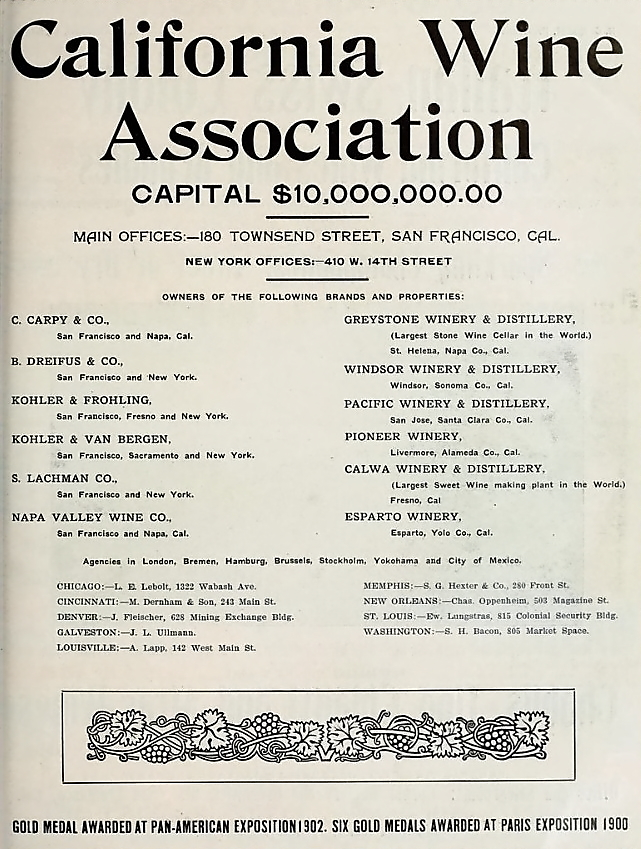
California Wine Association Advertisement 30 Nov 1906. Pacific Wine and Spirit Review

By 1909, the California Wine Association (CWA) total wine and real estate value reached over $10,000,000 U.S. dollars (Press Democrat reference above). Elected directors of the CWA that year included Isaias Hellman who was by that time President of Wells Fargo-Nevada National Bank, Daniel Meyer, Percy Morgan, and Pietro C. Rossi founder of the Italian Swiss Colony in Asti, CA, among others. Winehaven at Richmond, CA had a 10,000,000 gallon capacity, and was the largest wine producer in the world at that time.

Daniel Meyer is noted in the CWA meeting minutes as an elected director of California Wine Association for eight straight years from 1904 through 1911 until his death.

== California wine association / selected cwa-owned facilities ==
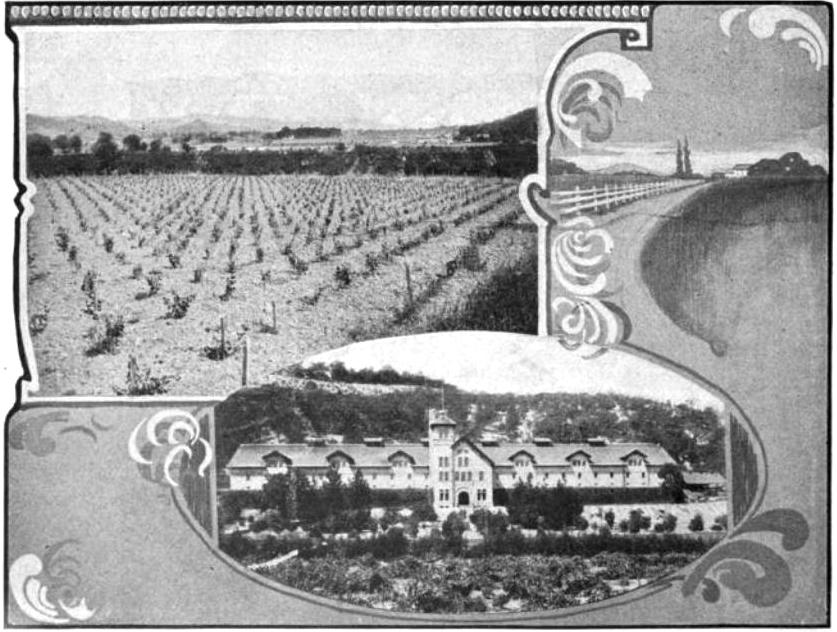
Greystone Cellars 1902

CWA bought Greystone Winery in St. Helena, California circa 1894, and continued to operate it until approximately 1920. At the time, this winery boasted the world's largest stone wine cellar (see image at right). The facility went through various ownerships, and was completely renovated by the The Culinary Institute of America at Greystone, which continues to use it as a school as of 2026. Greystone Winery, St. Helena, CA is listed on the National Register of Historic Places.

In 1896, one of California's largest wineries was built in the California Central Valley near Fresno, CA at a cost of $2,500,000 by California Wine Association, and named "CALWA". A reporter for Fresno Bee toured the facility in depth in 1903 with the CALWA staff, noting a two million gallon storage capacity, 500 ton/day grape crushing capacity, one million gallon fermentation tank capacity, and a special sherry heat treatment room with 200,000 gallon capacity (same reference as above).

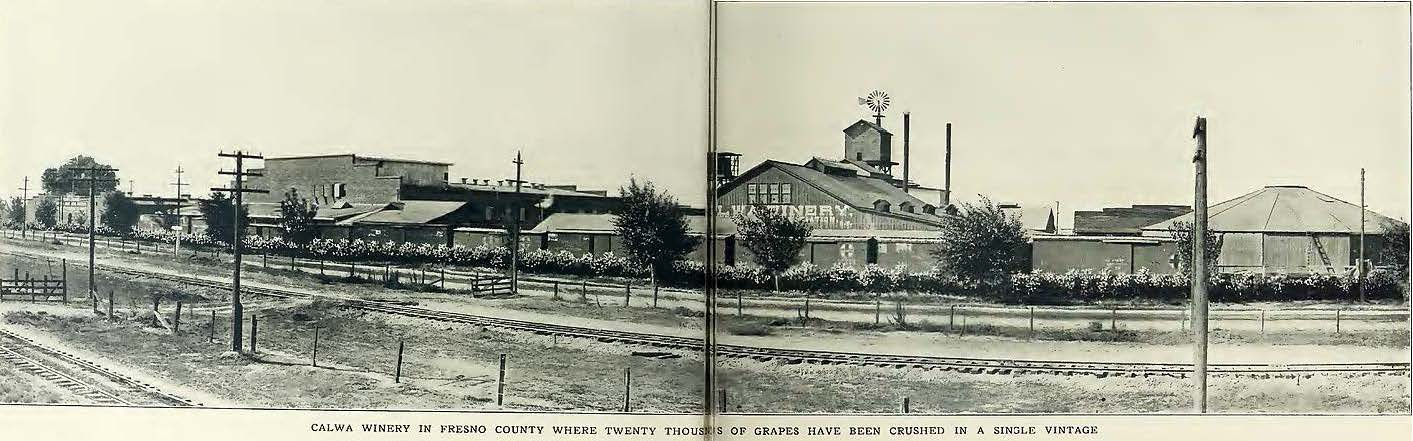
CALWA Winery Near Fresno, CA, Circa 1909 (A California Wine Association-Owned Winery)

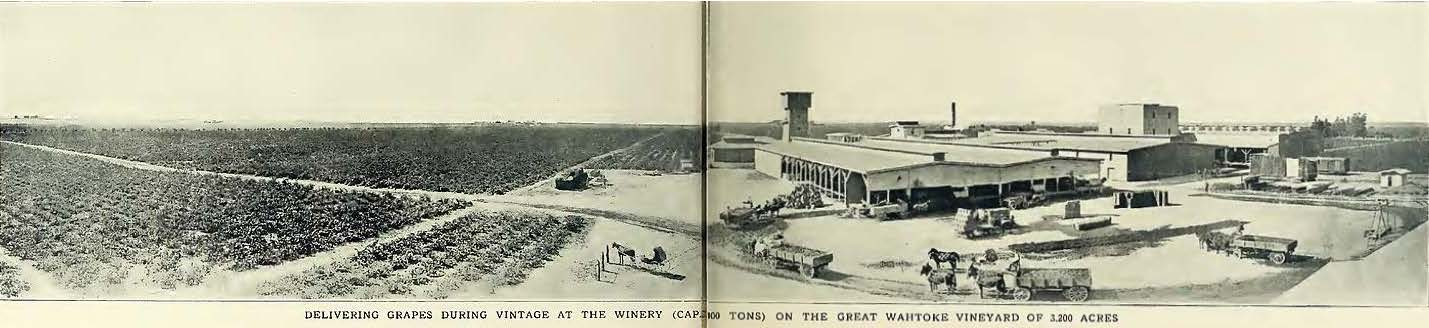
Wahtoke Winery Near Reedley, CA, Circa 1909 (A California Wine Association-Owned Winery)

A second major wine producing facility called WAHTOKE Winery was built in 1905 by the California Wine Association, for the specific purpose of producing sweet wine from local CWA-owned vineyards. This winery consisted initially of 1,480 acres, located five miles north of Reedley, California. The plant was expanded in 1907 and became the largest sweet wine (dessert wine) producing plant in the world at that time, with 3,000 acres in wine grape production and 2 to 3 million gallons of yearly wine production, with the total facility covering six square miles of land area.

The winery was sold during the USA prohibition period and bought by the Cella Family (Cella Winery) in 1944. As of 2026, the winery is owned by The Wine Group LLC and can be located through the internet search heading "Franzia-Sanger" (Sanger, California). The facility now has a yearly output of 63,000 to 85,000 tons of grapes per year, for wine and grape juice concentrate production, which calculates to approximately 12.75 million gallons of wine and grape juice production per year.

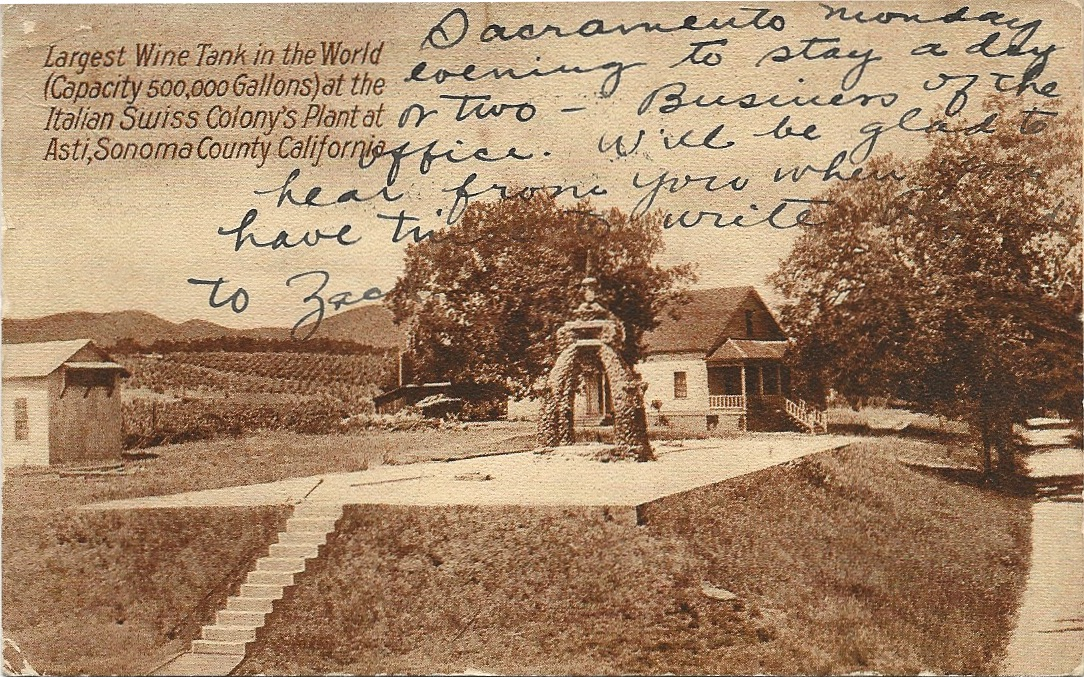
Post Card of the Italian Swiss Colony's Plant, Sonoma County California.

Italian Swiss Colony was one of the largest California wine producers, out of Asti, Sonoma County, California, in the 20th century. 50% of the wine producer was owned by California Wine Association as of 1901. 100% of the company came under CWA control circa 1911 after the death of founder Pietro C. Rossi (reference: UC Berkeley Bancroft library oral history transcription. In-process of obtaining permission to post this reference). The winery experienced various ownership changes, and is currently owned by Gallo (winery) (formerly known as E. & J. Gallo Winery) as of 2015 onward: the largest family-owned winery in the United States, headquartered in Modesto, California.

Note that the original historic Italian Swiss Colony San Francisco headquarters building (pre-1906 earthquake) is located at 1265 Battery Street, San Francisco, CA, and is officially designated as San Francisco Landmark #102 List of San Francisco Designated Landmarks. This warehouse survived the 1906 earthquake and fire, was restored in the 21st Century by Gensler Architecture, and is now part of the Levi's World Headquarters Levi's Plaza. The building was originally used to store wine brought in from Asti, CA, prior to it being shipped off via steamer ships along the San Francisco waterfront. The Italian Swiss Colony warehouse location is noted in the S.F. Langely Directory year 1906 as "SE Corner Battery and Greenwich" (originally no numeric address).

== Banking, mining, and agriculture in California & Nevada / 1850s through 1911 ==
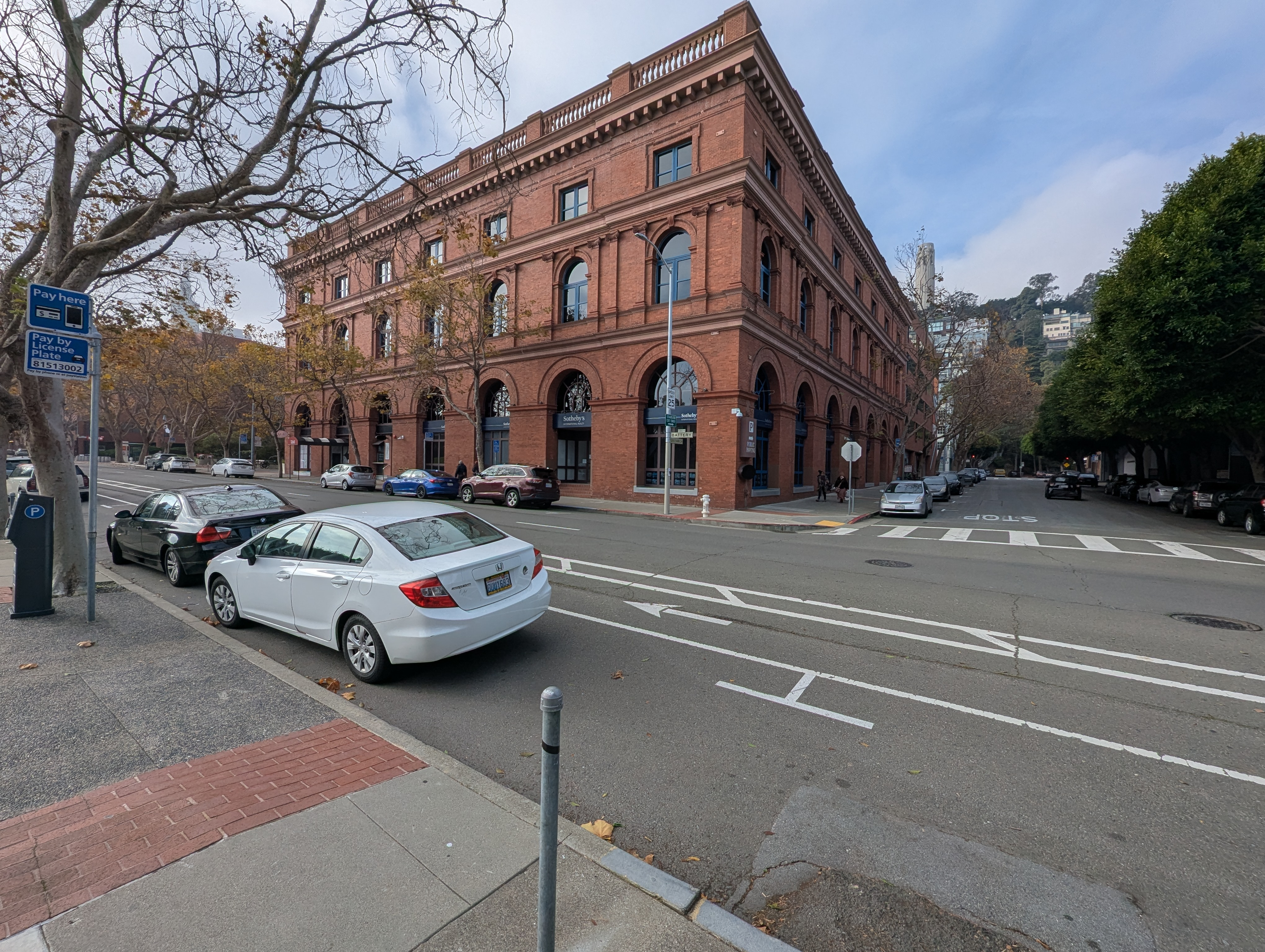
Levi's Plaza (1265 Battery 002)

Bank of Daniel Meyer focused mainly on mining and agriculture operations in Nevada and California, financing much of California's grain export which was at the time the principal source of income for the state. The bank furnished funds for development of gold, silver, lead, and mercury mining properties, with a focus on the Reno, Nevada and Virginia City, Nevada areas.

Abraham Meyer and Daniel Meyer's names are listed on approximately twenty-eight (28) hand-written gold, silver, and lead mining deed transaction documents filed with Storey County, Nevada Territory Recorder's Office between 1860 and 1863, which confirms the bank's early involvement with mine development at famous ore deposits such as the Comstock Lode or Comstock Mining District, Virginia City, Nevada (formerly Nevada Territory).

Several blank paper checks circa 1870s exist in private collections with "Daniel Meyer San Francisco" imprinted on the obverse along with the names of various Nevada mining companies and a bank check tax imprint noting "two cents" per check paid to the IRS, indicating that the mining companies were conducting their financial business at Bank of Daniel Meyer. It may or may not also indicate direct ownership of the mining companies by Bank of Daniel Meyer.

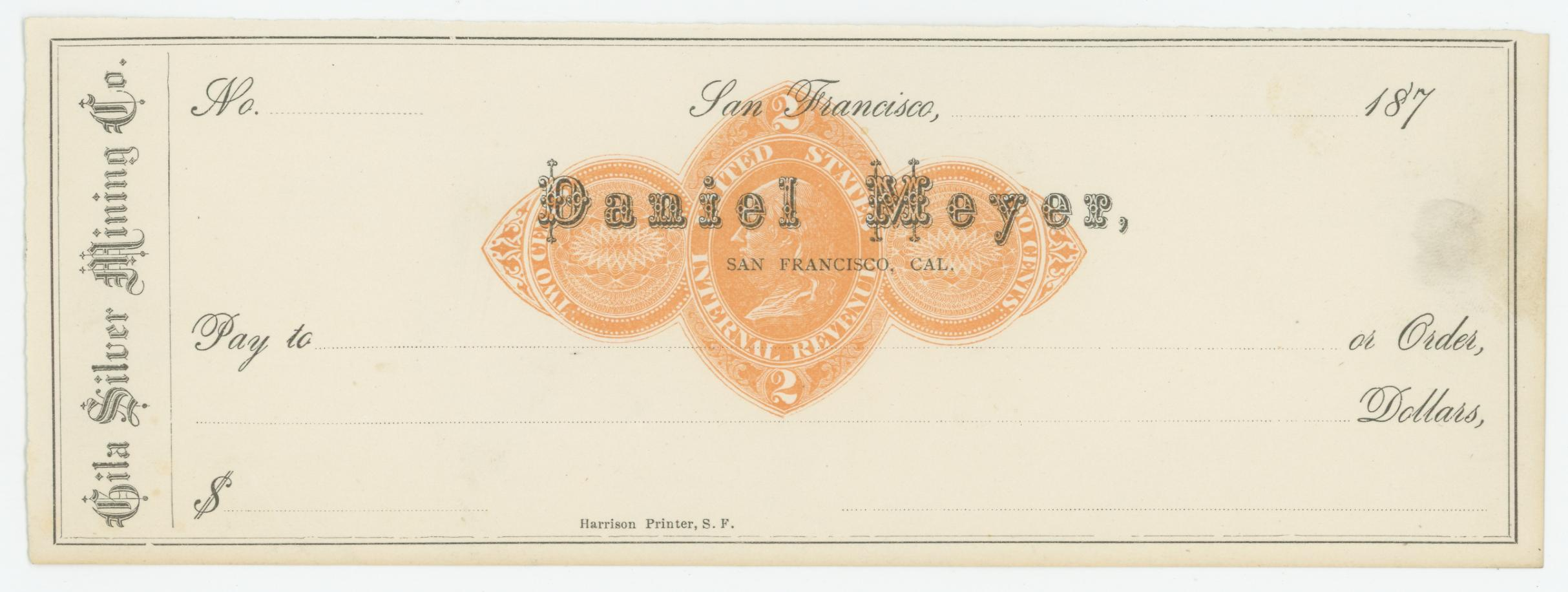
Daniel Meyer Check - Gila Silver Mining Co. Circa 1870s

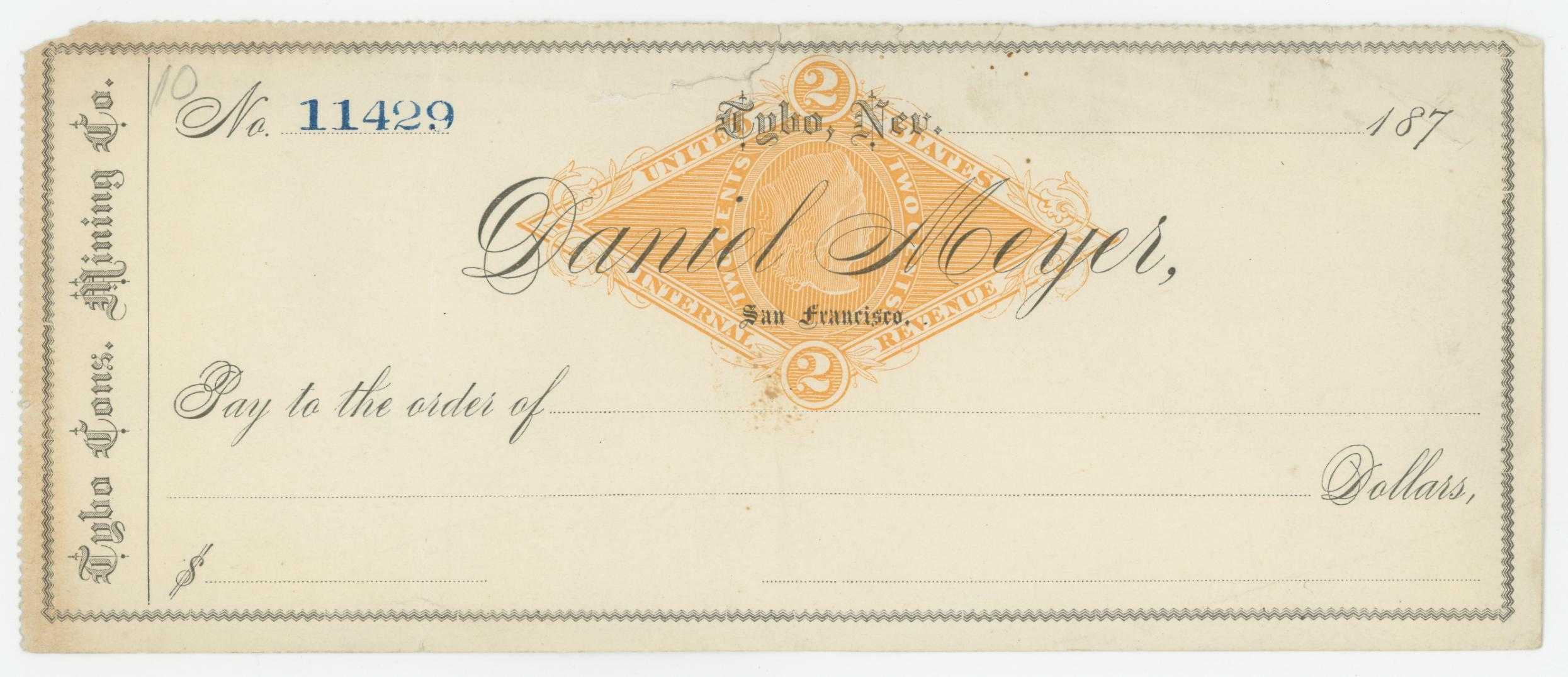
Daniel Meyer Check - Tybo Cons Mining Co. Courtesy of Mr. Peter Schwartz

Daily Alta newspaper listings from 1862, 1863, and 1864 note Daniel Meyer as a shareholder of Sierra Nevada Silver Mining Company, Echo Gold and Silver Mining Company, and Monte Cristo Silver Mining Company respectively.

A winter 1880 shipment by Daniel Meyer included 300,000 pounds of lead, and 20,498 pounds of "base bullion" (amalgamated precious metals) aboard the S.S. Granada, sailing from San Francisco to New York, and in 1881, Daniel Meyer was noted to have acquired a Pope Valley Quicksilver Mining Company property in Pope Valley, Napa County, California, for $25,000.

The January 1880 edition of Mining and Scientific Press noted that Daniel Meyer processed 3,049 flasks of quicksilver (mercury) in 1878 at the Oat Hill mine in Napa County, California, and 3,605 flasks (273,980 pounds) at that mine in 1879.

Daniel Meyer and his nephew Moritz Scheeline incorporated The Eureka County Bank in Eureka County, Nevada (a mining area) in 1885 with $100,000 capitalization. In 1890, Meyer and Scheeline organized the Bank of Nevada with $300,000 capitalization (Hoexter and Hoexter reference), based in Reno, Nevada, which was the largest bank in the State of Nevada for 15 years, between 1890 and 1905. In 1906, Moritz Scheeline was noted as first vice president of Bank of Nevada, and Daniel Meyer was noted as owning the controlling interest in the bank. In 1907, Scheeline was still noted as vice president of Bank of Nevada, with Daniel Meyer as a director of the bank.

== Sutro tunnel ==
Daniel's brother and Bank of Daniel Meyer employee Moritz Meyer was elected President of and a Trustee of the Sutro Tunnel Company in 1887: a year during which the company was embroiled in legal disputes. This company was well known across the US as the entity involved in digging massive mine drainage conveyance systems through the Comstock Lode silver ore mines in Nevada, USA, at a cost of many millions of U.S. dollars, headed by Adolph Sutro of San Francisco, CA (see image below right).

Oddly, the company's officers' election the following year in 1888 was mainly a "proxy vote" with only a few actual shareholders present, which resulted in almost the entire elected board being changed out. The 1887 board members (which included Meyer) formally protested the legality of this action and initially refused to give up their accounting books to the newly elected 1888 board, which suddenly included a member of the Sutro family as president, effectively ending Meyer's work with this company.

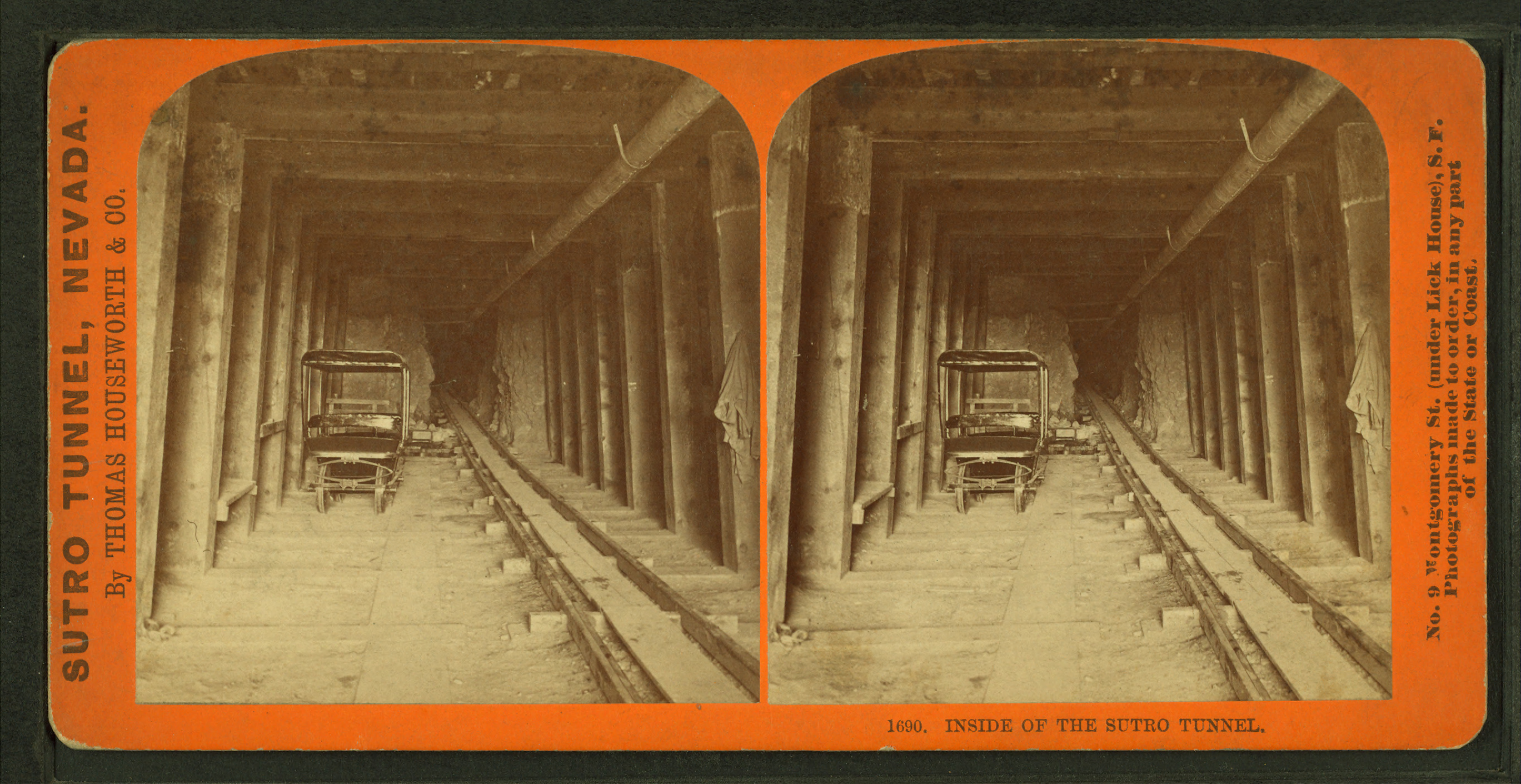
Inside the Sutro Tunnel, by Thomas Houseworth & Co.

== The Traffic Association of California and development of the San Joaquin Valley Railroad ==
In the 1890s, a unique group of industrialists, bankers, and others in San Francisco met to set up the Traffic Association of California, designed to further the development of commerce and trade in the West Coast.

The Traffic Association of California was headquartered at the Bank of Daniel Meyer building at 214 Pine Street, San Francisco, CA, owned by Daniel Meyer (same reference as above). Daniel Meyer was noted as a member of the association.

On May 26, 1892, an ambitious rail project was incorporated by five members of the association, including Daniel Meyer, with initial capitalization of $2,000,000. This corporation was "The San Francisco and Great Salt Lake Railway", and was to link Utah with San Francisco as an alternative competing rail line that would remove the monopoly that Southern Pacific Railroad held in California at that time, upgrading commercial traffic between the United States interior, and central California. The project was estimated to require $30,000,000 to complete the entire rail line, as was ultimately abandoned due to lack of adequate funding.

The Traffic Association of California decided to scale down the rail project significantly, and in 1895, revived it in a series of meetings in San Francisco which solidified the plan as the "[[San Francisco and San Joaquin Valley Railroad|San Francisco and San Joaquin Valley Railway Company]], which would lay rails from China Basin in San Francisco, CA, to Bakersfield, CA. A committee was set up to form this corporation. The committee included sugar industrialist Claus Spreckels, Alexander Boyd, James Phelan, O.D. Baldwin, Daniel Meyer of Daniel Meyer Bank, W.F. Whittier, Albert Miller, Charles Holbrook, Thomas Magee, John T. Doyle, E.F. Preston, Lewis Gerstle, Levi Strauss of Levi Strauss & Co., Christian de Guigne (Parrott Estate), J.P. Martin (Sharon Estate), Andrew McCreery, and Alfred Borel of Borel & Co. bank in San Francisco. Most or all of these committee members bought large blocks of stock in the railway, prior to incorporation, with Daniel Meyer purchasing $25,000. These planning meetings to incorporate the railway company were considered at the time to be one of the most important events in San Francisco history, in terms of forwarding development in the State of California (same reference as above).

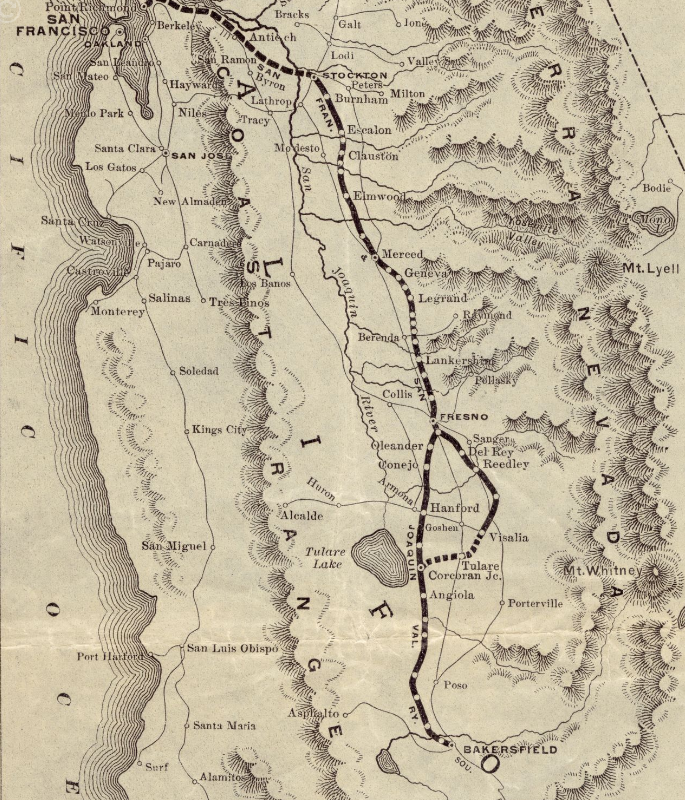
San Francisco and San Joaquin Valley Rail line

The railway was incorporated February 25, 1895 at San Francisco City Hall, with capitalization of $6,000,000. Daniel Meyer was elected as one of the Trustees of the railroad corporation on April 5, 1895.

Construction of the railway commenced in 1895 and continued until completion of the Stockton to Bakersfield line in 1898: a distance of some 230 or more miles (see historic map image above). In 1898, Santa Fe (railroad) purchased the corporation's Stockton to Bakersfield section of new rail line, before the rail connection between Stockton and San Francisco could be built. The rail line was eventually extended to Richmond, CA, linking the Bay Area with Bakersfield. The historic rail line between Richmond, CA and Bakersfield, CA is still in regular use today as of 2026.

== Pacific Stock Exchange ==
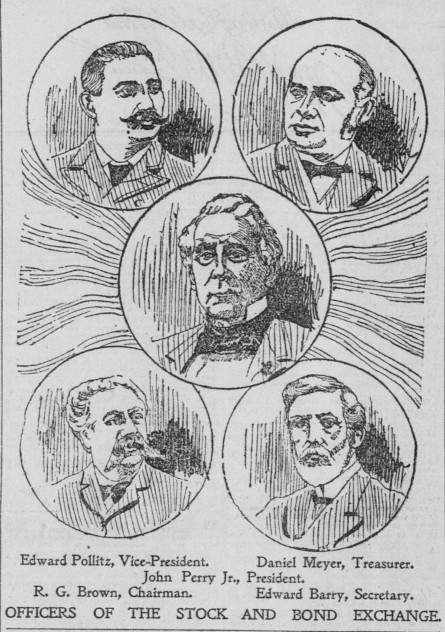
Daniel Meyer, Treasurer. 6 Sept 1896. San Francisco Stock and Bond Exchange.

Daniel Meyer was voted in as the first Treasurer of the San Francisco Stock and Bond Exchange in 1882, (later to become the Pacific Stock Exchange). He was still noted as the elected Treasurer as of 1896, 14 years later (see Daniel Meyer profile drawing in upper right of image at right).

Daniel's brother Mathias Meyer was noted as one of the 27 original San Francisco Stock and Bond Exchange members in its first year 1882. By 1916, the SFSBE was the 3rd largest stock exchange in the United States.

== The san francisco mining exchange ==
Established in 1862, The San Francisco Mining Exchange is the 4th oldest stock exchange in the United States, after the Philadelphia, New York, and Boston stock exchanges. It was set up to allow for purchase and sales of West Coast mining company stocks during the California Gold Rush period, and remained active until closure in 1967. Daniel's brother Mathias Meyer was noted as one of the 126 broker members of the exchange upon its reopening in 1907, after the great San Francisco Earthquake and Fire destroyed the physical location of its original headquarters. Note that at this period in history, the California gold rush was at its end, and most mining activity in the 1860s involved extraction of silver ore, which contained some gold content, centered around the booming Gold Hill and Virginia City mining districts of Nevada Territory: a geological area often referred to generally as "the Comstock" or the Comstock Lode. Nevada became a state within the United States on October 31, 1864.

== Crystal Springs Dam / San Mateo, California ==
Crystal Springs Dam was completed in 1889 by the Spring Valley Water Company (SVWC), an entity that bought and controlled the San Andreas watershed, Lake Merced watershed, and other watersheds (tens of thousands of acres of land in San Mateo County and San Francisco County) in order to build up a stable surface drinking water supply for the City and County of San Francisco. At the time of its completion, the dam was the largest dam in the world, and also the largest concrete structure in the world, per various USA engineering sources, the crowning achievement of the SVWC. In the image below right taken in 1887 (not "1925" as noted on the image file) during an official inspection of the first year of dam construction, Daniel Meyer is present in the first row, holding a cane, along with Charles Webb Howard the SVWC President, Hermann Schussler chief engineer, Charles Mayne SVWC director, Thomas Brown President of Bank of California, Lloyd Tevis President of Wells Fargo & Co., John Perry Jr. San Francisco stockbroker, and W.H. Lawrence SVWC general superintendent. Given Meyer's documented funding of large scale irrigation and agriculture projects throughout California, it is likely that he was a Spring Valley shareholder. This is a subject of ongoing research. The SVWC official historical files are archived at the Bancroft Library, UC Berkeley, CA.

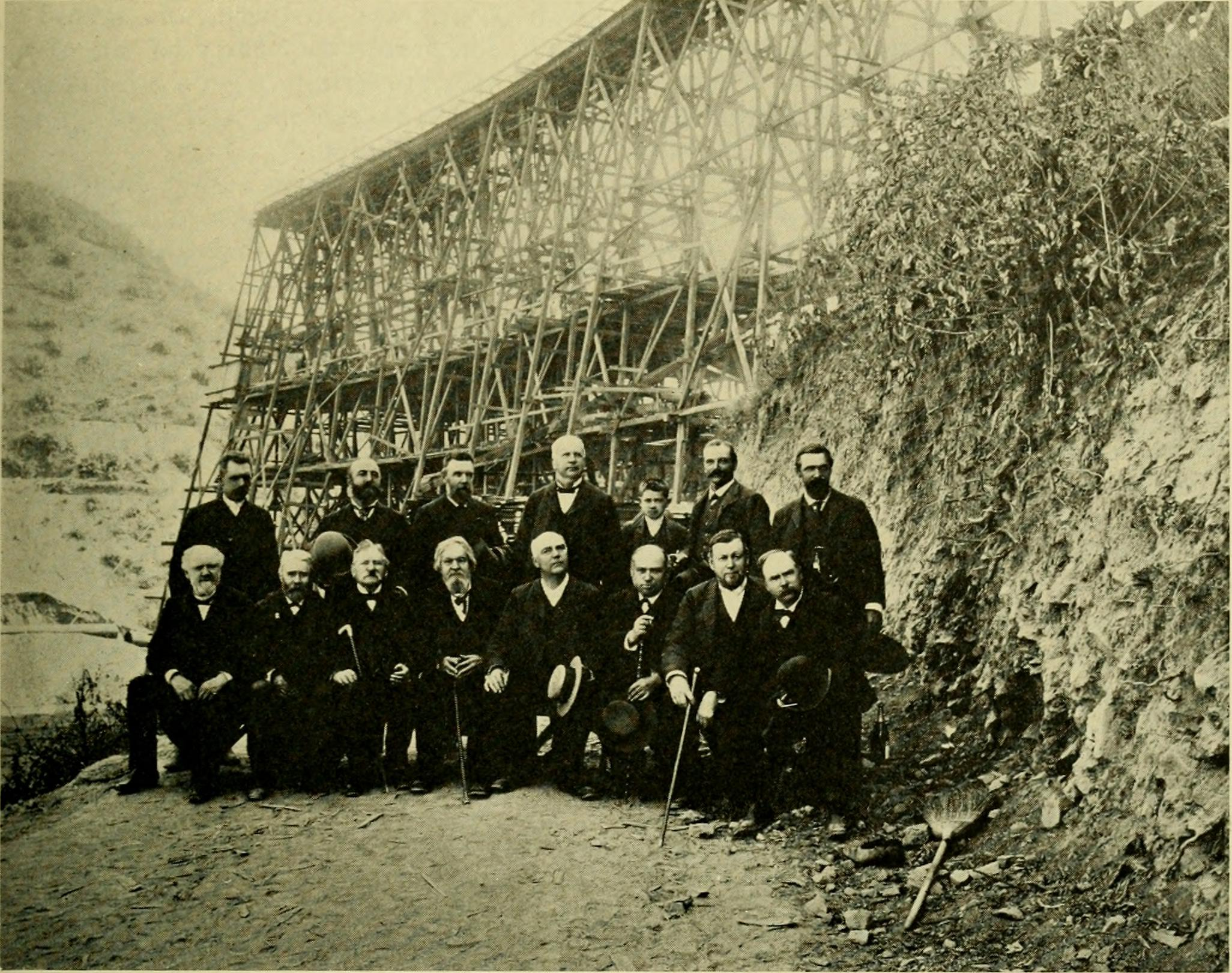
San Francisco water (1925) (14597154188)

== Other activities ==
Daniel Meyer was listed as one of the directors of the National Insurance Company: a firm with capital of $1,000,000, based in San Francisco, California, that was able to insure various structures, noting "losses payable in United States Gold Coin".

== Death ==
The bank was dissolved soon after Daniel Meyer's death in 1911, at which time the Daniel Meyer estate was valued at more than $4,000,000: a very large sum in the early 20th century. The estate was distributed after paying an inheritance tax of $238,718. This was the largest such tax ever paid in the State of California up to that date.

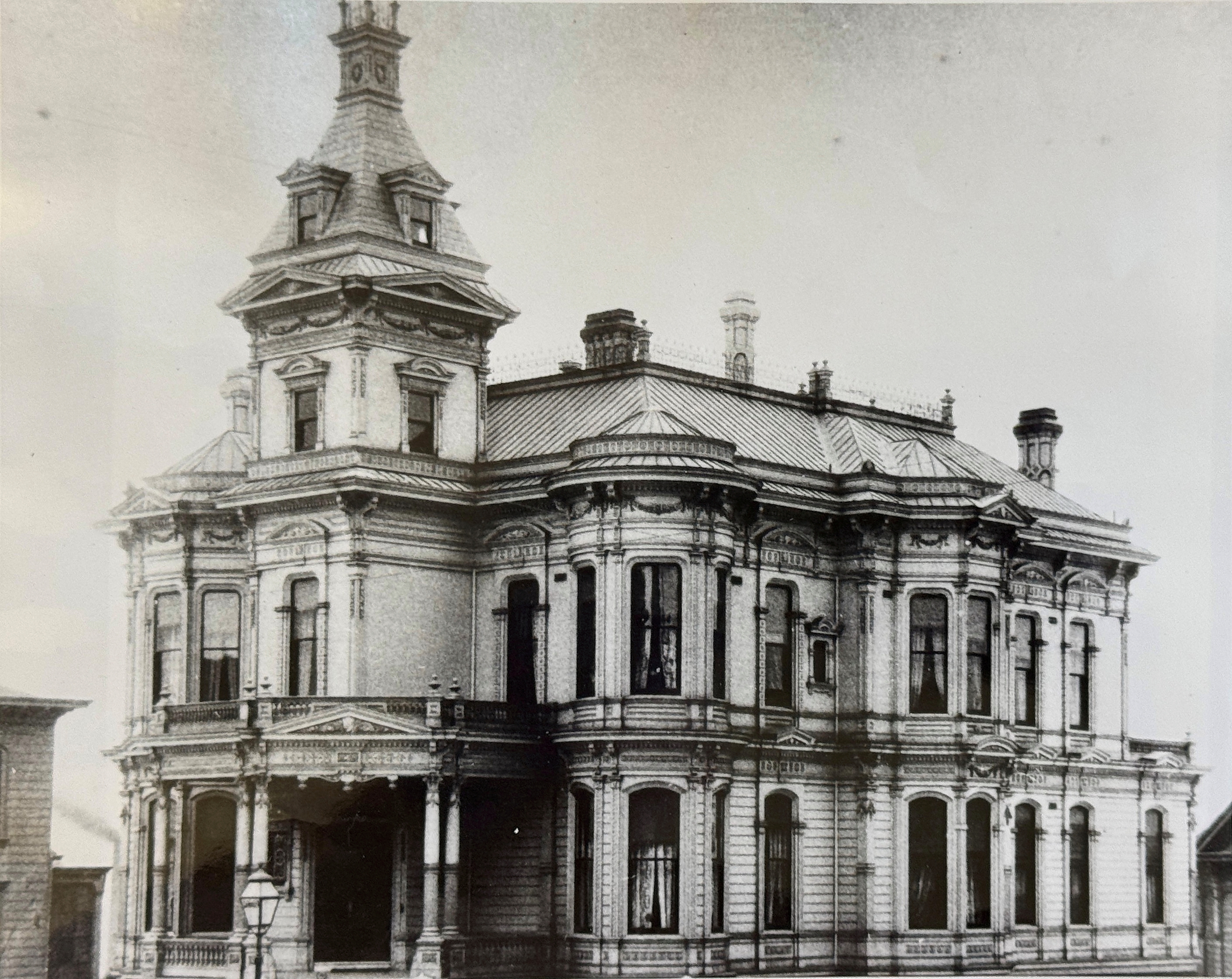
Daniel Meyer's personal San Francisco, Victorian residence at 1827 California Street no longer exists.
