= San Francisco Curb Exchange =

San Francisco Curb Exchange Organisation

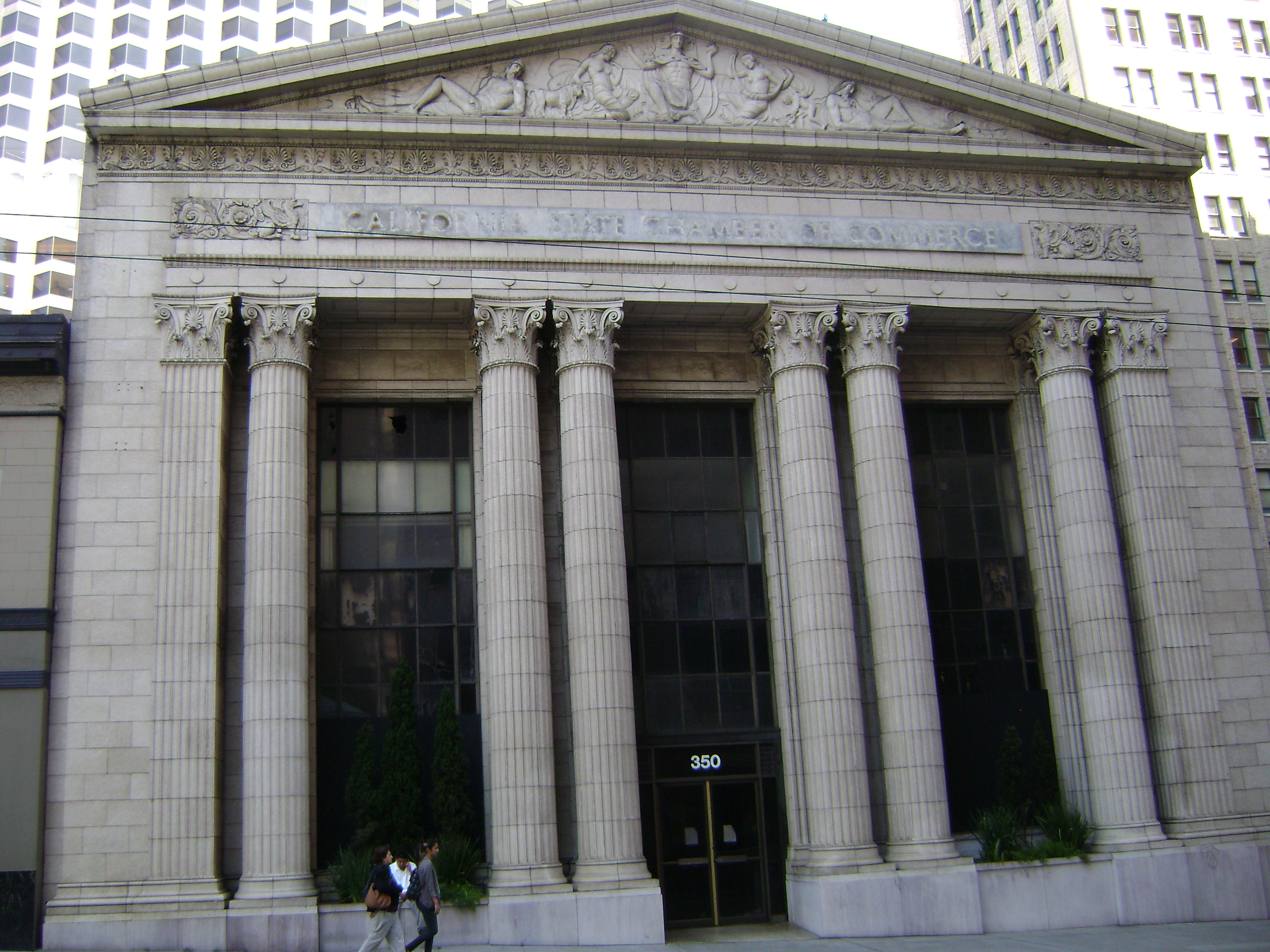
- Type: Regional stock exchange, curb exchange
- Location: San Francisco, California, United States
- Founded: 1928 at 350 Bush Street
- Closed: 1938 (absorbed by the San Francisco Stock Exchange)
- Currency: United States dollar

The San Francisco Curb Exchange was a curb exchange opened in 1928, formed out of a re-organization of the San Francisco Stock and Bond Exchange and the San Francisco Mining Exchange. The San Francisco Curb Exchange replaced the Mining Exchange at the 350 Bush Street building. The Curb Exchange later left the building in 1938, when the Curb Exchange was absorbed by the San Francisco Stock Exchange.

== History ==
=== Formation ===
By April 23, 1927, the San Francisco Stock and Bond Exchange and the San Francisco Stock Exchange, mining, were negotiating over the establishment of the former as purely listed market, and the latter as a curb exchange. To prevent naming confusion, there were talks to have the SF Stock Exchange be named the San Francisco Curb Exchange or Association, with the name 'San Francisco Stock Exchange' to become the property of the Stock and Bond Exchange. Upon the ratification of the agreement, there would be ninety days for corporations with stocks "on the unlisted board [of the San Francisco Stock and Bond Exchange] to meet listing requirements or to be transferred to the Curb board, where "another probationary period will ensue in which Curb requirements may be met." It was said these curb requirements would be "substantially" those of the New York Curb Market.

In December 1927, the Stock and Bond Exchange voted for reorganization and division of business in the exchange, resulting in the creation of a new curb market in San Francisco. On December 9, 1927, it was reported that the new San Francisco Curb Exchange was expected to begin operation soon after the start of 1928, and would be the third security markets in the city.

=== Opening on Bush Street ===
The new Curb Exchange was created to take over the "splendid plant on Bush Street of the old Mining Exchange." The Curb Exchange started activities on January 2, 1928, using the unlisted securities formerly on the SF Stock and Bond Exchange. Per the agreement behind the formation of the curb market, all members of the SF Stock and Bond Exchange held memberships in both the new Stock Exchange and the new curb exchange. The Curb had an authorized 100 charter members, 67 from the Stock and Bond Exchange, and the remaining made available for sale.

The Curb Exchange left the Bush Street building in 1938, when it was absorbed by the San Francisco Stock Exchange.

== Reuse of front facade ==
The Curb Exchange's old Bush Street building sat empty after 1979. In August 2018, a brand new 19-story high-rise office building opened behind the old building's facade. To comply with historic preservation requirements, the developer kept the front facade of the Curb Exchange, but tore down everything behind the facade, and built a reconstruction of the old trading hall through which visitors must walk to reach the office tower behind it.

== See also ==
- Curbstone broker
- Regional stock exchange
- List of former stock exchanges in the Americas
- List of stock exchange mergers in the Americas
- History of San Francisco
