= San Francisco Mining Exchange =

Mining stock exchange in San Francisco

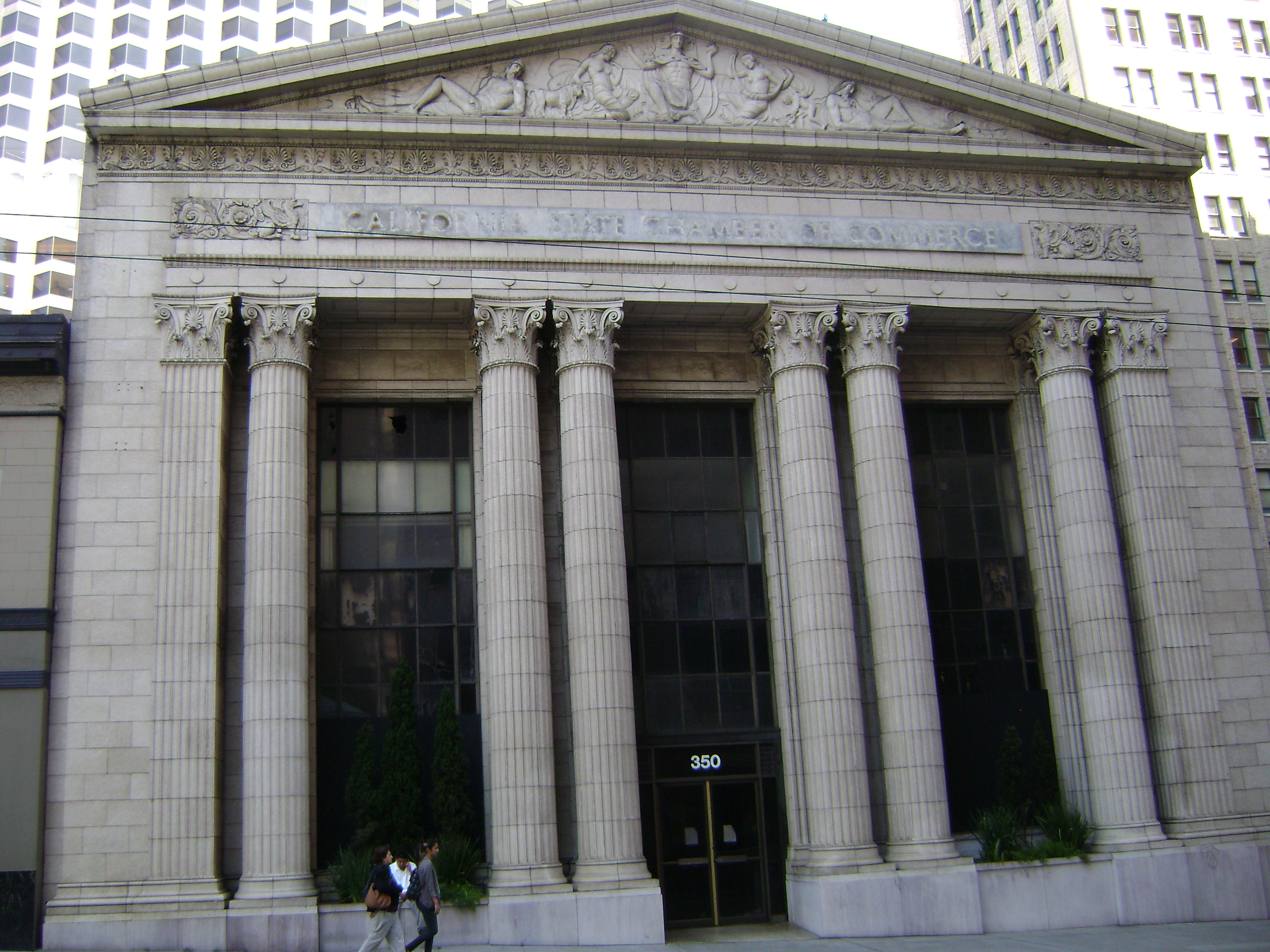
- Type: Regional stock exchange
- Location: San Francisco, California, United States
- Founded: 1862 as the San Francisco Stock Exchange
- Closed: August 1967
- Commodities: Minerals and natural resources

The San Francisco Mining Exchange was a regional stock exchange in San Francisco that operated from 1862 until its closure in 1967.

Formed in 1862 to facilitate the trading of mining stocks as the San Francisco Stock Exchange, the Chicago Tribune described the exchange as "once the West's most flamboyant financial institution."

It sold the name San Francisco Stock Exchange to the San Francisco Stock and Bond Exchange in December 1927 and was renamed the San Francisco Mining Exchange. The exchange agreed to deal solely in mining securities as part of the same deal, and also sold its building at 350 Bush Street to the San Francisco Curb Exchange.

After years of ups and downs in the mining market, the exchange had "a second life" during the uranium boom of the 1950s. By August 1967, it was located in second-floor offices on Montgomery Street, at which point it was the smallest securities market in the United States and had suffered "years of lingering legal and money ailments." The exchange closed at the age of 105 in August 1967.

== History ==
=== Formation ===
According to the Chicago Tribune, the exchange was founded after the discovery of Nevada's Comstock lode, and on September 11, 1862, forty founders each paid $50 to form a central market for gold and silver shares. After years of ups and downs in share value, by 1872 the 40 original memberships had increased to 80, with a value of $43,000 per seat. Trading declined in the 1880s, but increased again in the early 1920s after an increase in market speculation and trading. In response to the increase, the Mining Exchange hired Miller & Pflueger to design a building at 350 Bush Street. The building opened in 1923, and was a trading hall for mining commodities until 1928.

=== 1927-1928: Restructuring ===
By April 23, 1927, the San Francisco Stock Exchange, mining division, and the San Francisco Stock and Bond Exchange were negotiating over the establishment of the Stock and Bond Exchange as a purely listed market, and the San Francisco Stock Exchange as a curb exchange. To prevent naming confusion, there were talks to have the SF Stock Exchange be named the San Francisco Curb Exchange or Association, with the name 'San Francisco Stock Exchange' to become the property of the Stock and Bond Exchange.

After earlier reports, on December 9, 1927, it was reported that an agreement to re-organize the San Francisco Stock Exchange had been authorized, with changes to take place immediately. The exchange was renamed the San Francisco Mining Exchange and agreed to deal solely in mining securities, while the name San Francisco Stock Exchange was sold to the Stock and Bond Exchange. Also, the old building occupied by the original San Francisco Stock Exchange was put for sale. The new San Francisco Curb Exchange took over the "splendid plant on Bush Street of the old Mining Exchange" at the 350 Bush Street building, and started activities in the building on January 2, 1928 as the third security markets in the city.

=== Later years ===
In 1939, George Flach became the exchange's final president. The Chicago Tribune described the exchange as "once the West's most flamboyant financial institution." After years of ups and downs in the mining market, the exchange had "a second life" during the uranium boom of the 1950s.

By August 1967, it was located in second-floor offices on Montgomery Street, at which point it was the smallest securities market in the United States and had suffered "years of lingering legal and money ailments."It also only had two remaining active brokers: Flach and Raymond Broy, a treasurer with the company since 1933. When Broy wanted to retire due to age and sickness, Flach decided to quit the exchange as well. The exchange closed at the age of 105 in August 1967. It closed of its own accord, although the Securities and Exchange commission had five and a half years earlier ordered it to close. Flach stated that the exchange had "successfully resisting government revocation of our registration," but that the exchange was closing due to low trading volume. After the final gong was rung at the second-level trading floor on the southeast corner of Montgomery Street at Pine Street, the doors were padlocked on August 15 at the close of business.

== See also ==
- Regional stock exchange
- List of San Francisco Designated Landmarks
- List of former stock exchanges in the Americas
- List of stock exchange mergers in the Americas
- History of San Francisco
