= San Francisco Stock and Bond Exchange =

American regional stock exchange

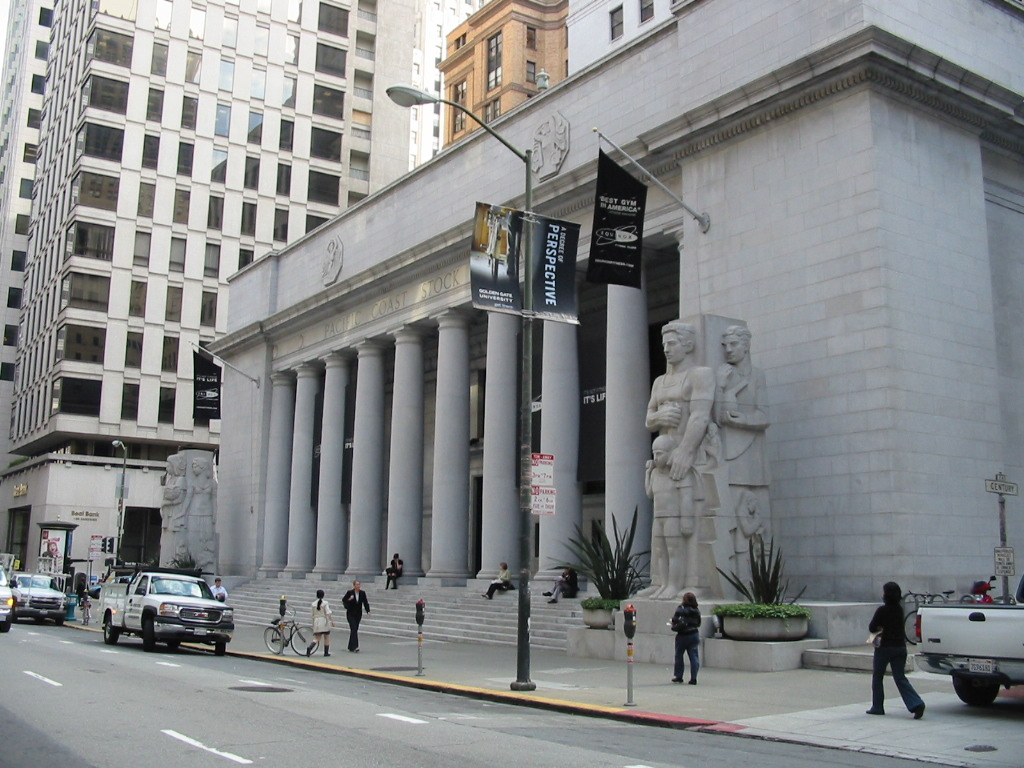
- Type: Regional stock exchange
- Location: San Francisco, California, United States
- Founded: 1882 in San Francisco
- Closed: 1957 (merged)
- Currency: United States dollar

The San Francisco Stock and Bond Exchange was a regional stock exchange based in San Francisco, California, United States. Founded in 1882, in 1928 the exchange purchased and began using the name San Francisco Stock Exchange, while the old San Francisco Stock Exchange was renamed the San Francisco Mining Exchange. The San Francisco Curb Exchange was absorbed by the San Francisco Stock Exchange in 1938. In 1956 the San Francisco Stock Exchange merged with the Los Angeles Oil Exchange to create the Pacific Coast Stock Exchange.

== History ==
=== Formation ===
The San Francisco Stock and Bond Exchange was founded in 1882 on September 18, in a basement in San Francisco. The exchange was founded as the San Francisco Stock Exchange. On September 18, twenty-five brokers met in the basement of Wohl & Rollitz, which was at 403 California Street in the old Fireman's Fund Insurance Building. Of that number, 19 signed the charter and deposited $50 to purchase memberships. The first president was John Perry Jr.

It had nineteen charter members, who called it "the Local Security Board." The first year of business, transactions totaled $9,490,621. After the World War I stock market shutdown that started in July 1914, the San Francisco Stock and Bond Exchange reopened on December 1, 1914, for trading for bonds under restrictions, three days after the NYSE reopened.

=== Negotiations with SF Stock Exchange ===
By April 23, 1927, the San Francisco Stock and Bond Exchanges and the San Francisco Stock Exchange, mining, were negotiating over the establishment of the former as purely listed market, and the latter as a curb exchange. To prevent naming confusion, there were talks to have the SF Stock Exchange be named the San Francisco Curb Exchange or Association, with the name 'San Francisco Stock Exchange' to become the property of the Stock and Bond Exchange. Upon the ratification of the agreement, there would be ninety days for corporations with stocks "on the unlisted board [of the San Francisco Stock and Bond Exchange] to meet listing requirements or to be transferred to the Curb board, where "another probationary period will ensue in which Curb requirements may be met." It was said these curb requirements would be "substantially" those of the New York Curb.

=== 1927–1928: Restructuring ===
In August 1927, the exchange adopted new regulations for its listed securities. The following month, the San Francisco exchange broke a business record for itself, when it had weekly trading total of $16,936,019.

In December 1927, the exchange's monthly business surpassed $100 million for the first time. Also that month, the exchange voted for reorganization and division of business in the exchange, with the exchange expanding.

On December 9, 1927, it was reported that the agreement to re-organize with the San Francisco Stock Exchange had been authorized, with changes to take place immediately. Also, the old building occupied by the San Francisco Stock Exchange was put for sale, with the exchange to be renamed the San Francisco Mining Exchange. In the agreement, the San Francisco Mining Exchange agreed to deal solely in mining securities, with the name San Francisco Stock Exchange sold to the Stock and Bond Exchange.

The new San Francisco Curb Exchange was expected to begin operation soon after the start of 1928, and would be the third securities market in the city. According to the agreement, all members of the SF Stock and Bond Exchange would hold memberships in both the new Stock Exchange and the new curb exchange. The Curb would have an authorized 100 charter members, 67 from the Stock and Bond Exchange, and the remaining available for sale. The new Curb Exchange was created to take over the "splendid plant on Bush Street of the old Mining Exchange." The Curb Exchange started activities on January 2, 1928, using the unlisted securities formerly on the SF Stock and Bond Exchange.

=== As Pacific Coast division ===
As of late 1928, Sidney L. Schwartz was president of the San Francisco Stock Exchange, which was the renamed San Francisco Stock and Bond Exchange. The San Francisco Curb Exchange was absorbed by the San Francisco Stock Exchange in 1938.

In 1957, the Los Angeles Oil Exchange (formed in 1899) and the San Francisco Stock and Bond Exchange merged to create the Pacific Coast Stock Exchange, with trading floors maintained in both cities. As of September 15, 1957, the former San Francisco Stock and Bond Exchange was operational as the San Francisco division of the Pacific Coast Stock Exchange.

== See also ==
- Regional stock exchange
- List of former stock exchanges in the Americas
- List of stock exchange mergers in the Americas
- History of San Francisco
- Timeline of San Francisco
