= 23 Wall Street =

Commercial building in Manhattan, New York

- U.S. National Register of Historic Places
- U.S. Historic district – Contributing property
- New York State Register of Historic Places
- New York City Landmark
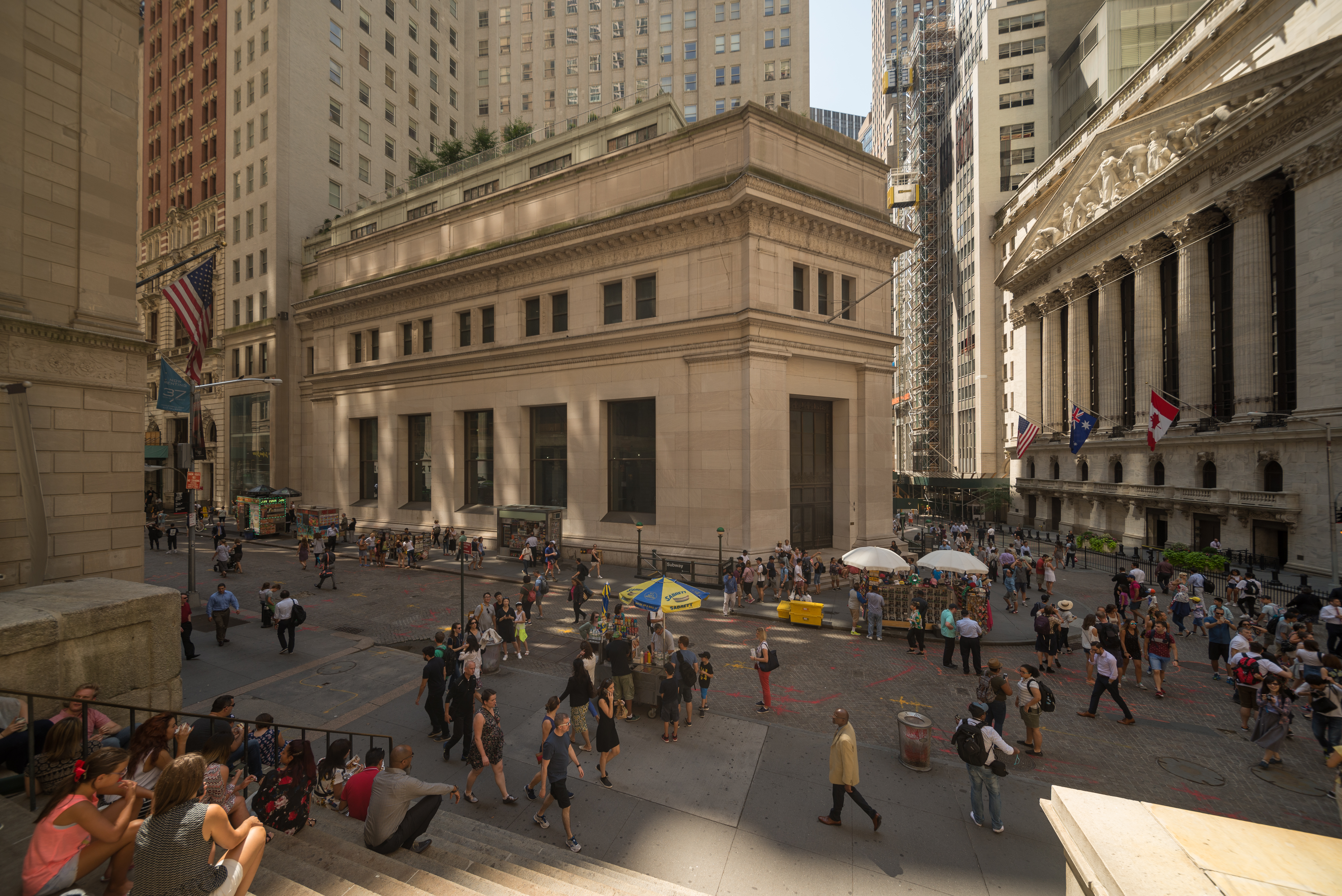
- The building as seen from the steps of Federal Hall; the New York Stock Exchange Building is visible at right
- Interactive map of 23 Wall Street
- Location: Manhattan, New York, US
- Coordinates: 40°42′25″N 74°00′38″W
- Built: 1913–1914
- Architect: Trowbridge & Livingston
- Architectural style: Neoclassical
- Website: 23wallretail.com
- Part of: Wall Street Historic District (ID07000063)
- NRHP reference No.: 72000874
- NYSRHP No.: 06101.000390
- NYCL No.: 0039

Significant dates
- Added to NRHP: June 19, 1972
- Designated CP: February 20, 2007
- Designated NYSRHP: June 23, 1980
- Designated NYCL: December 21, 1965

23 Wall Street (also known as the J.P. Morgan Building) is a four-story office building in the Financial District of Manhattan in New York City, United States. Located at the southeast corner of Wall Street and Broad Street, it was designed by Trowbridge & Livingston in the neoclassical style and constructed from 1913 to 1914. It was originally the headquarters of J.P. Morgan & Co. Since the late 2000s, the building has remained unoccupied for long periods, although it has occasionally been used for events.

The building has a facade of ashlar masonry and pink Tennessee marble. The first floor consists of a piano nobile over a low basement; above are the second story, the main cornice, and two more stories. After its completion, the building became known as the headquarters of J.P. Morgan & Co.—the "House of Morgan"—although its exterior was never signed with the Morgan name. The banking room, which took up nearly the entire ground floor, included offices and was used for banking transactions. This space was designed with a domed, coffered ceiling and, later, a large crystal chandelier. Mechanical systems and vaults were in the basement, and executive offices were placed on the upper floors.

23 Wall Street replaced the Drexel Building, which was the banking headquarters for J.P. Morgan & Co.'s predecessor Drexel, Morgan & Co. When the building was damaged during the Wall Street bombing in 1920, J.P. Morgan & Co. refused to make repairs, in defiance of the bombing's perpetrators. The building was linked to neighboring 15 Broad Street in 1957, and the two buildings served as the J.P. Morgan & Co. headquarters until 1988, when the firm moved to 60 Wall Street. During the 2000s, there were plans to convert both 23 Wall Street and 15 Broad Street into a condominium complex. In 2008, 23 Wall Street was sold to interests associated with the billionaire industrialist Sam Pa but mostly remained empty afterward.

Depicted in several media works, 23 Wall Street's simple design was generally praised upon its completion. The building is a New York City designated landmark and is listed on the National Register of Historic Places (NRHP); it is also a contributing property to the NRHP-listed Wall Street Historic District.

== Site ==
23 Wall Street is in the Financial District of Manhattan in New York City, at the southeast corner of Broad Street to the west and Wall Street to the north. The building's land lot has a frontage of about 113 feet (34 m) along Broad Street and 157 feet (48 m) along Wall Street. It borders 15 Broad Street to the south and west. Other nearby buildings include the New York Stock Exchange Building to the west; 14 Wall Street to the northwest; Federal Hall National Memorial (formerly the sub-Treasury building) at 26 Wall Street to the north; and 40 Wall Street to the northeast. The Broad Street station of the New York City Subway, serving the J and Z trains, contains entrances directly outside 23 Wall Street.

The Second Empire style Drexel Building—the banking headquarters for Drexel, Morgan & Co., predecessor of J.P. Morgan & Co.—previously occupied 23 Wall Street's site. Anthony Drexel had bought the site in 1872 for $348 per square foot ($3,750/m^{2}), making it the city's most expensive plot of land at the time. The Drexel Building, completed in 1873, was designed with a mansard roof and marble walls. Its seven stories had been connected by a steam elevator, one of the city's earliest such installations. The Real Estate Record and Guide characterized the Drexel Building as "the second fireproof building of importance" to be built in New York City, after the Equitable Life Building.

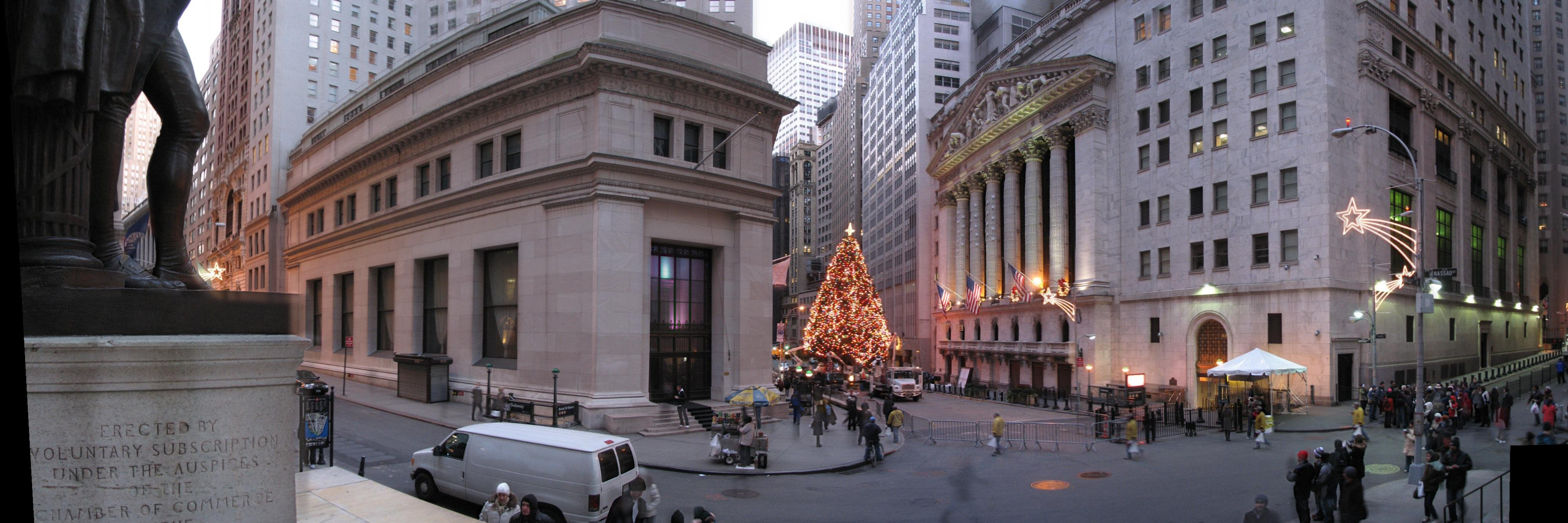
Panoramic view of the site with the George Washington statue outside Federal Hall at far left, 23 Wall Street at center left, and the New York Stock Exchange Building at right

== Architecture ==
Trowbridge & Livingston designed 23 Wall Street in the neoclassical style. Marc Eidlitz was the building's main construction contractor. Many other engineers and contractors were involved in the building's construction, including elevator supplier A. B. See, vault contractor Carnegie Steel Company, and vault engineer Frederick S. Holmes. 23 Wall Street was the headquarters of J.P. Morgan & Co., the "House of Morgan", and was nicknamed "The Corner". J. P. Morgan Jr., the head of the bank when the building was being planned, dictated many aspects of its design. Unlike skyscrapers in the surrounding area, 23 Wall Street was built with only four above-ground stories. The building originally contained up to five mezzanine levels, leading Architecture and Building magazine to characterize it as a nine-story building.

The building is shaped like an irregular heptagon, with a chamfered corner at its main entrance at Wall and Broad Streets, as well as a "light court" on the building's eastern side at the third and fourth stories. The southeast corner contains an extension that protrudes slightly from the southern lot line. The main entrance corner, facing the intersection of Wall, Broad, and Nassau Streets, was intended to make the intersection appear like a public square outside Federal Hall. When the building was being designed, Morgan had stipulated the architects include an entrance at that corner. The acute angle of the intersection led Trowbridge & Livingston to design that entrance as a chamfer, which was more architecturally appealing. The facade rises about 85 feet (26 m) above street level. Because of the irregular shape, the building only takes up 92 feet (28 m) on Broad Street and 135 feet (41 m) on Wall Street, or about 20 feet (6.1 m) less than the lot frontage on either side.

=== Facade ===
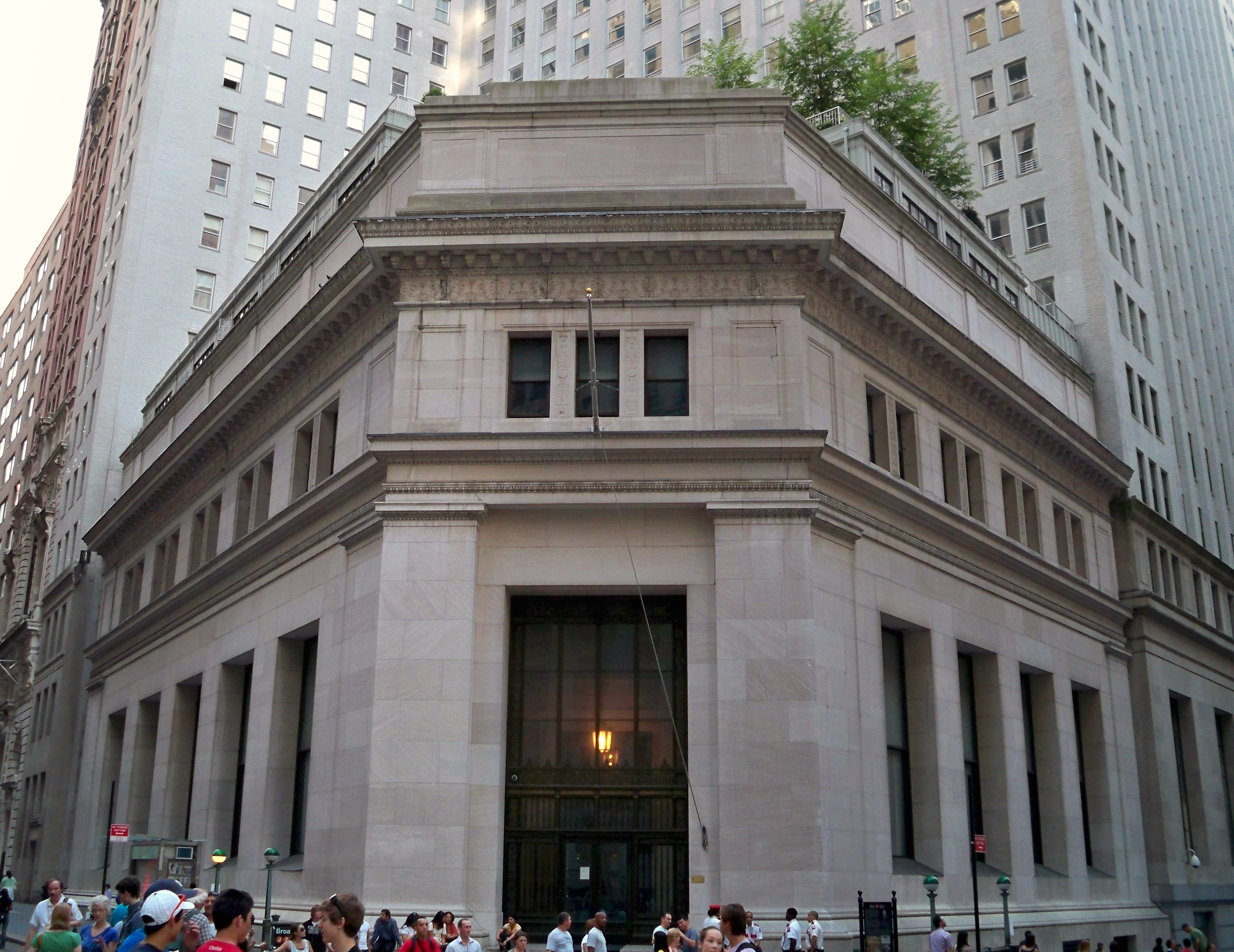
Seen in 2010

The facade is made of ashlar masonry and pink Tennessee marble, in accordance with J. P. Morgan Sr.'s request that the marble be identical to that used in his 36th Street residence's library. Each of the marble blocks was laid horizontally, with a cross section of 3 by 3 feet (0.91 by 0.91 m) and a length of 7 to 22 feet (2.1 to 6.7 m). To furnish the marble for the project, the Morgans used their own quarry in Knoxville, Tennessee. The walls are astylar in design, with unadorned windows in deep reveals. The facade contains several divots caused by flying shrapnel from the Wall Street bombing, which occurred outside the building in 1920.

The first floor consists of a high piano nobile over a low basement. Above that are a shorter second story and the windowless third story; the fourth story is set back and not visible from street level. The main cornice, between the second and third stories, is inspired by Italian Renaissance architecture and wraps around the north, northwest, and west sides. A mechanical penthouse containing air-conditioning machinery is atop the original roof.

The main entrance is through the chamfered corner at Wall and Broad Streets; the building's corner measures 34 feet (10 m) wide. A short flight of five steps leads from the sidewalk to the large rectangular entrance opening, which is slightly recessed from the facade. The entrance opening contains a bronze-and-glass set of doors underneath a transom window made of bronze and glass. On either side of the entrance opening, the chamfered corner's walls are designed to resemble pilasters. The senior Morgan had stipulated that no company name signs would be on either of the pilasters, as he planned to add decorative elements, but he died before the plans were finalized. Ultimately, no name plaque was ever placed atop the main entrance, as the building became well known worldwide. The lintel above the doorway is a single continuous stone measuring 19 by 3.16 by 4 feet (6 by 1 by 1 m) and was, at the time of the building's construction, one of the largest stones ever brought to New York City. Above the main entrance, at the second story, there is a single set of three windows. According to The New York Times, the main entrance was sometimes also known by the building's nickname, "The Corner".

The remainders of the Wall and Broad Street facades are similar, except that the Broad Street facade has four vertical bays, and the Wall Street facade has five. In each bay, there is a tall rectangular window opening at ground level, as well as a pair of smaller openings at the mezzanine. Each of the ground-story windows measures 22 feet (6.7 m) tall and 12 feet (3.7 m) wide. There were also window openings at the basement level, subsequently infilled with marble. Another entrance on Broad Street led to the wire transfer department in the building's basement.

=== Features ===
==== Substructure and basement ====
The foundations of the outer walls were made of cofferdams that extended 65 feet (20 m) into the underlying bedrock. The concrete used in the cofferdams was laid 7 feet (2.1 m) thick. The perimeter of the site was excavated with pneumatic caissons averaging about 7 by 28 feet (2.1 by 8.5 m), after which the center of the lot was excavated to a depth of 55 feet (17 m). The foundations were built to be strong enough to support a tower of at least 30 stories.

The basement was accessed through an elevator and stairs in the rear of the ground story, as well as through the secondary entrance on Broad Street. It contained a three-story vault that, at the time of the building's completion, Architecture magazine described as "one of the largest in existence". The interior of the vault was cited as measuring 18 by 22 feet (5.5 by 6.7 m) with exterior dimensions of 23 by 27 feet (7.0 by 8.2 m). A stair and elevator connected the three levels in the vault; the elevator was nicknamed the money room. The vault walls were 2.5 feet (0.76 m) thick and were made of steel layers reinforced with concrete. The 50-short-ton (45-long-ton; 45 t) circular vault door, made of a steel composite, could be swung open with one hand. There was also a private shooting range for J.P. Morgan & Co. in the basement. The remaining space in the basement was used to house the building's mechanical systems, such as heating and ventilating systems, as well as vaults and storerooms.

==== Ground story ====
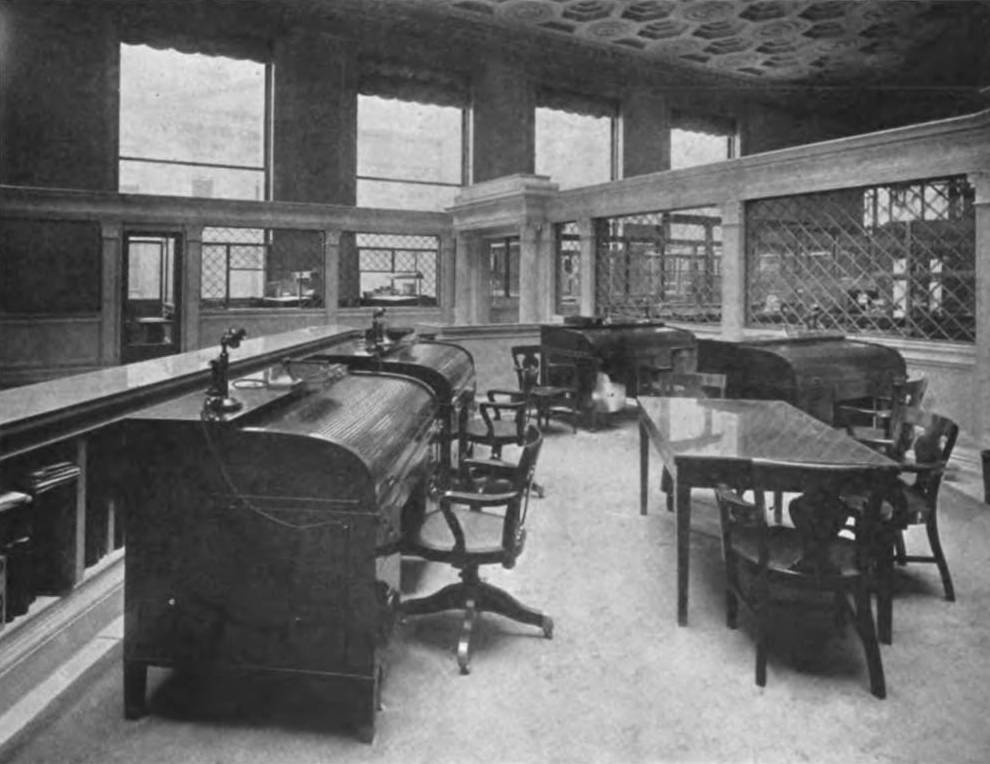
An office on the ground story

The entire ground story was designed as a symmetrical double-height space with single-height partitions. The small, irregular lot size meant that the design could not waste any space. Just inside the main entrance was an anteroom with a staircase on the left and an elevator on the right, which led to the upper-story executive offices. The main ground-story space covered 15,000 square feet (1,400 m^{2}). This space had no interior columns and was topped by a 30-foot-high (9.1 m) coffered ceiling with a pattern of gilded hexagons and circles. At the center of the room was a shallow domed skylight, measuring 35 feet (11 m) in diameter. During a renovation in the early 1960s, plaster replaced the glass dome, and a massive crystal chandelier was installed at the center. The 1,900-piece Louis Quinze chandelier was removed and placed in 15 Broad Street during a 2000s renovation of that building.

At the center of the room was a main lobby shaped like an irregular hexagon, which, according to author Ron Chernow, was intended to resemble the layout of a "London merchant bank". It contained bank officers' enclosures and a public hall. It had a mosaic floor tile and was surrounded by a screen of pink Tennessee marble, with bronze-and-glass grilles, as well as columns of Skyros marble. There were Italian Renaissance-style carvings sculpted by Charles Keck on the screen. On one side of the screen were depictions of the sea, the earth, and the air, inspired by Greek mythology. A depiction of Hiawatha, on the opposite side of the screen, was meant to represent agriculture and arts. Zodiac symbols were placed at the center of the floor; these symbols were emblems of a private club composed of J. P. Morgan Sr.'s friends. Shorter marble railings replaced the screen in the early 1960s renovation.

The ground floor's outer walls had wainscoting 11 feet (3.4 m) high. Above the wainscoting were large mosaic panels with marble frames. Along the hexagonal lobby's western and southern walls, to the right of the main entrance, there were conference rooms and partners' offices. The lobby's northern wall, to the left of the entrance, had two waiting rooms and the foreign exchange department. On the eastern wall of the hexagonal lobby, doors led to a rectangular banking space flanked by various offices. Two elevators and a set of stairs were in the southeast corner of the space. The elevators and stairs, as well as a correspondence office at the rear, were not part of the ground-level main space. A painting of Morgan's father J. P. Morgan was hung on the south wall above a marble fireplace. An arch on the rear wall connected with 15 Broad Street.

==== Upper stories ====
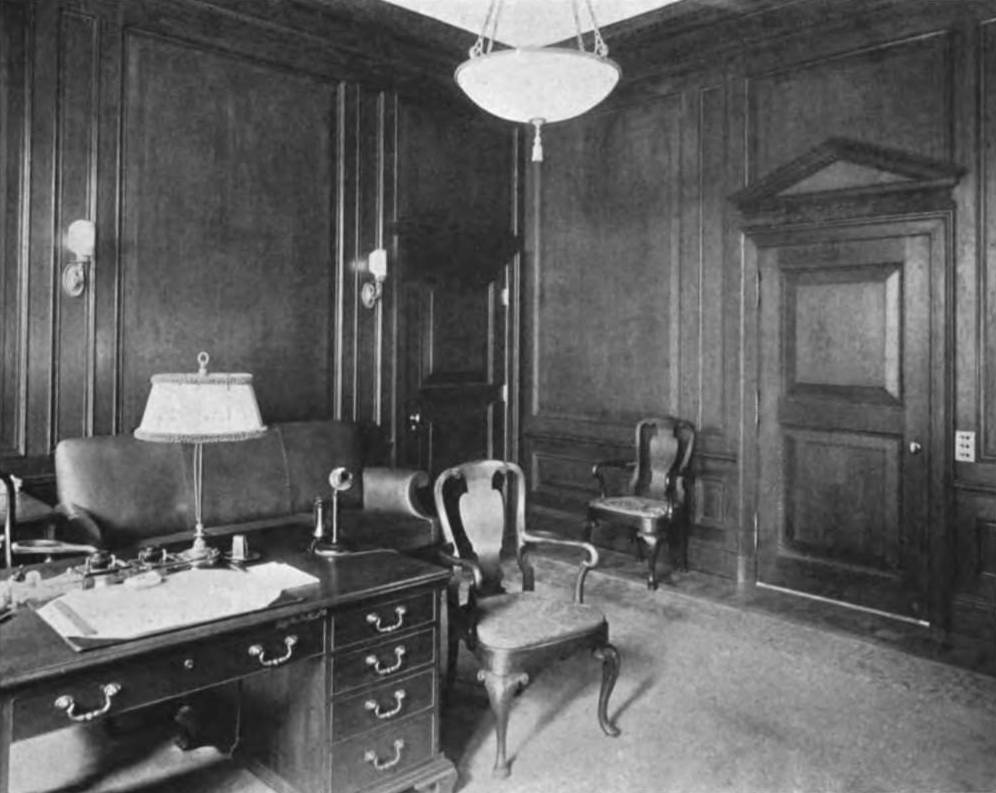
J. P. Morgan Jr.'s office

The superstructure is made of a steel frame, but the beams were hidden within the walls because Morgan had requested that they not be visible. Consequently, the upper floors are hung from a series of steel trusses 14 feet (4.3 m) deep and 100 feet (30 m) long; steel columns support the beams within the walls.

The second floor contained the private offices of the partners and their secretaries. The second story has a hole at its center, surrounding the main ground-floor room. Each partner had their own offices; the second-floor offices were designed based on the preferences of their respective occupants. An office for J. P. Morgan Jr. was directly above the building's main entrance and had a private stair leading down to ground level. Each room had fireplaces and generally contained English oak paneling. A central, oak-lined corridor connected the rooms.

The third floor contained private dining rooms, a kitchen, and bedrooms for executives. The fourth floor contained janitors' quarters, other minor divisions, and a roof garden facing the New York Stock Exchange. The roof garden measured about 24 by 42 feet (7.3 by 12.8 m) and could be covered by an awning, doubling as extra conference space during the summer. The fourth floor also contained a small barber shop. When 15 Broad Street was converted to condominiums in the 2000s, the roof of 23 Wall Street became a 5,000-square-foot (460 m^{2}) garden with children's pool and dining area, accessible to the residents of the development.

== History ==
Drexel, Morgan & Co., headed by Anthony J. Drexel and J. P. Morgan Sr., was renamed J.P. Morgan and Company after Drexel's death in 1893. During the late 19th century, the bank evolved into one of the most influential institutions in the United States, and the elder Morgan became one of the country's most powerful financiers. By the 20th century, many large corporations had opened investment accounts with J.P. Morgan & Co., and its members were directors of one-sixth of the United States' largest corporations.

By the 1900s, the Drexel Building had become too small for the bank's needs, and Morgan wanted a larger structure, akin to the National City Bank of New York's headquarters at 55 Wall Street one block away. J.P. Morgan & Co. was also leasing the Drexel Building from Anthony Drexel's estate instead of owning it outright. Morgan had long sought to acquire the building, but the Drexel estate had refused to sell. The site was considered the most valuable lot in New York City by the early 1910s. There had been an unsuccessful proposal to replace the Drexel Building and the adjacent Mills Building with a skyscraper. Ultimately, J.P. Morgan & Co. decided to construct an edifice solely for its own use; the new structure was to be smaller than the Drexel Building.

=== Construction ===
In February 1912, several publications reported that J.P. Morgan & Co. had bought the Drexel Building from the Drexel estate, though the purchase price was never revealed. Morgan founded a company to purchase the structure, although it was still unclear at the time whether the Drexel Building would be replaced. That September, the company finalized its purchase of the neighboring Mechanics and Metals National Bank building at 29–33 Wall Street. By that time, J.P. Morgan & Co. had decided to demolish and replace the structure. The Mechanics Bank lot, covering 6,000 square feet (560 m^{2}), was valued at $1.62 million (equivalent to $54 million in 2025 (Note: 1634–1699: McCusker, J. J. (1997). How Much Is That in Real Money? A Historical Price Index for Use as a Deflator of Money Values in the Economy of the United States: Addenda et Corrigenda (PDF). American Antiquarian Society. 1700–1799: McCusker, J. J. (1992). How Much Is That in Real Money? A Historical Price Index for Use as a Deflator of Money Values in the Economy of the United States (PDF). American Antiquarian Society. 1800–present: Federal Reserve Bank of Minneapolis. "Consumer Price Index (estimate) 1800–".)), and the 10,000-square-foot (930 m^{2}) Drexel Building lot was valued at $2.7 million (equivalent to $90 million in 2025). The replacement building would be among the many ongoing redevelopment projects in the neighborhood.

The senior Morgan leased a temporary office on the 31st floor of 14 Wall Street, where he was able to observe work on his new building. By early 1913, Trowbridge & Livingston were chosen as architects for the new structure. Although the means of their selection was not mentioned in published literature, an unpublished memoir by one of the firm's principals, Goodhue Livingston, indicated that they had won an architectural design competition. Trowbridge & Livingston submitted their plans for the structure to the New York City Department of Buildings in February 1913. Morgan died the next month, shortly before work began on the new headquarters. All occupants of the two buildings were ordered to vacate by May 1, 1913. The demolition of the Drexel and National Bank buildings began on that date. Two heroic statues from the Drexel Building were taken for storage to the Morgan Library, and a family member took six columns.

The site was cleared completely by late July 1913 and foundation installation began. The foundation work required underpinning the Mills Building with nineteen pneumatic cylinders, excavating the site's perimeter using caissons, and excavating the lot's interior. By that November, the foundation was completed, and the superstructure had reached the first floor. A ceremonial cornerstone was laid in December 1913 by J. P. Morgan Jr., who had succeeded his father as head of J.P. Morgan & Co. The facade of 23 Wall Street was substantially completed in June 1914, when protective scaffolding surrounding the site was removed.

=== Early 20th century ===
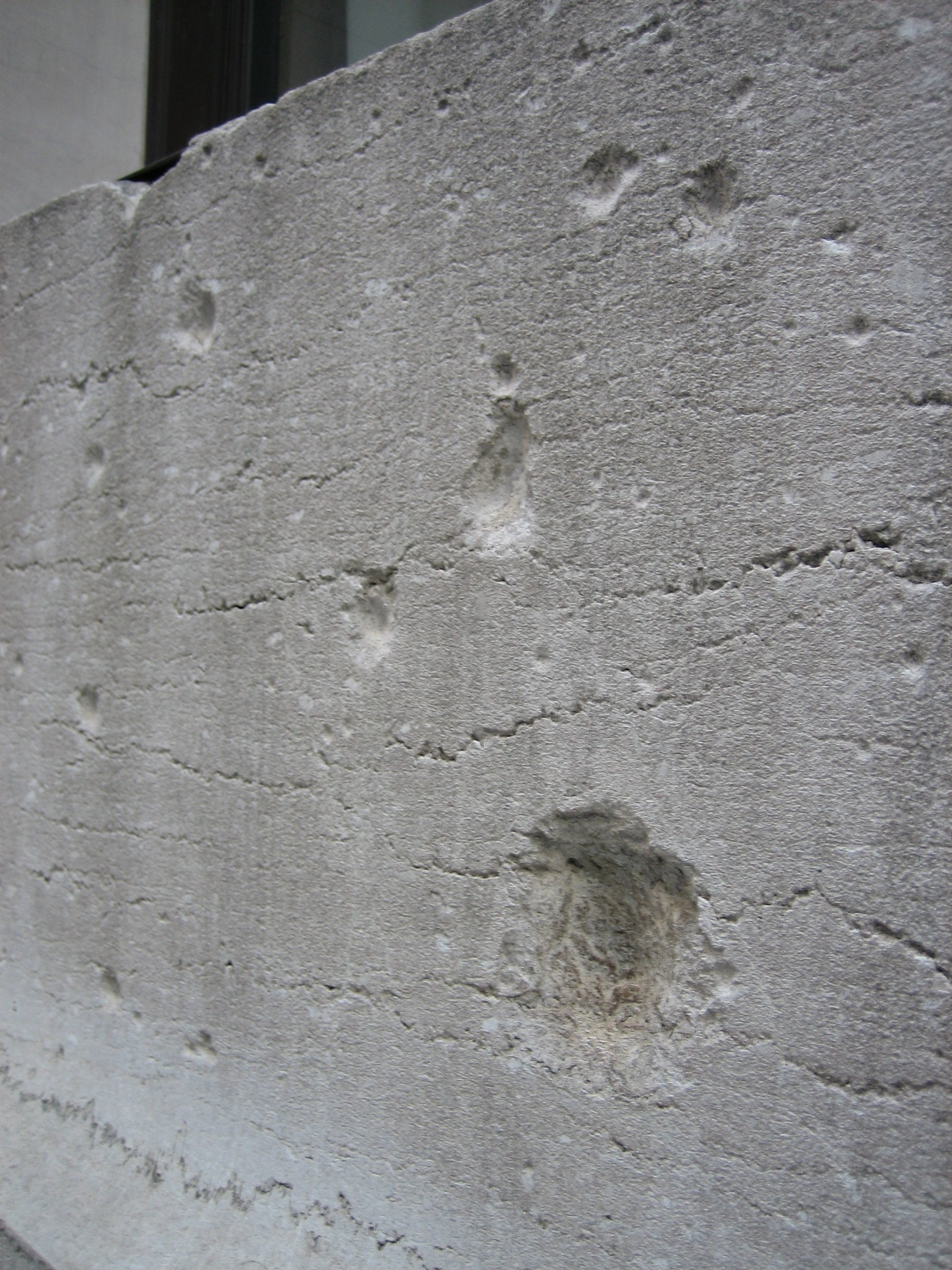
Exterior damage from the Wall Street bombing in 1920

23 Wall Street officially opened on November 11, 1914, although the bank's departments had gradually moved to the building from temporary headquarters during that month. The total cost of construction was estimated at over $5 million (equivalent to $161 million in 2025), of which $4 million had been allocated to land acquisition (equivalent to $129 million in 2025). The absence of a name plaque on 23 Wall Street's facade contrasted with the Drexel Building, where the company's name had been engraved above the doorway. Chernow said "the new building was compact and mysterious, reflecting the bank's penchant for privacy". Despite the lack of exterior name identification, the building quickly became associated with J.P. Morgan & Co.

After J. P. Morgan Jr. helped fund the Allies of World War I, (Note: For instance, following the war's outbreak, he lent $12 million to Russia; in 1915, he lent $500 million to France and Britain following negotiations by the Anglo-French Financial Commission.) he received death threats and survived an assassination attempt. (Note: In 1915, German national Eric Muenter entered Morgan's Long Island mansion and shot him, ostensibly to discourage Morgan from funding further industrial purchases for the Allies.) To protect him, detectives were stationed outside and around 23 Wall Street for several months. According to Livingston, a wire net across the roof would deflect any missile or bomb dropped onto the building, and the thick walls would prevent against damage from explosions. On September 16, 1920, the Wall Street bombing occurred outside the building, killing 38 people and injuring hundreds more. Most of the victims were outside the building, but the blast also killed one Morgan employee. The bomb damaged many of the Morgan building's interior spaces after shrapnel had entered through its large windows, causing between $500,000 and $600,000 in damage. The exterior stonework received only superficial pockmarks from shrapnel. J.P. Morgan & Company said that, in defiance of those who committed the crime, it would not repair the exterior damage. More than four decades later, The New York Times described the pockmarks as "a badge of honor".

During the late 1920s, Trowbridge & Livingston designed 15 Broad Street, an L-shaped skyscraper that wrapped around 23 Wall Street to the south and east. The skyscraper contained a truss above the Morgan building. To allow the inclusion of this truss, J.P. Morgan & Co. leased the air rights above 23 Wall Street to the Equitable Trust Company, for which 15 Broad Street was being constructed. Heavy timbers were placed on 23 Wall Street's roof to protect it while the skyscraper was being built. By then, 23 Wall Street did not have sufficient space for J.P. Morgan & Co.'s needs, so the bank leased some space at 15 Broad Street in 1929. Trowbridge & Livingston prepared plans in 1930 for an addition to the Morgan building. The plans called for four rooms to be built above a small court on the southeast corner of the building at a cost of $74,000. As built, 23 Wall Street's top two floors had wrapped around that court and did not occupy the whole lot area. When the Broad Street subway station opened the next year, J.P. Morgan & Co. paid for the installation of bronze stanchions and railings at the subway entrances just outside 23 Wall Street.

=== Mid- and late 20th century ===
Even after the 1930 expansion was completed, J.P. Morgan & Co. still did not have space to fit all of its facilities at its Wall and Broad Street location. More space was rented elsewhere, such as the employees' cafeteria, which was placed several blocks away at 120 Wall Street. J.P. Morgan & Co. indicated in late 1955 that it would purchase 15 Broad Street from the Chase Manhattan Bank. In 1957, J.P. Morgan & Co. built connections between both buildings on several stories.

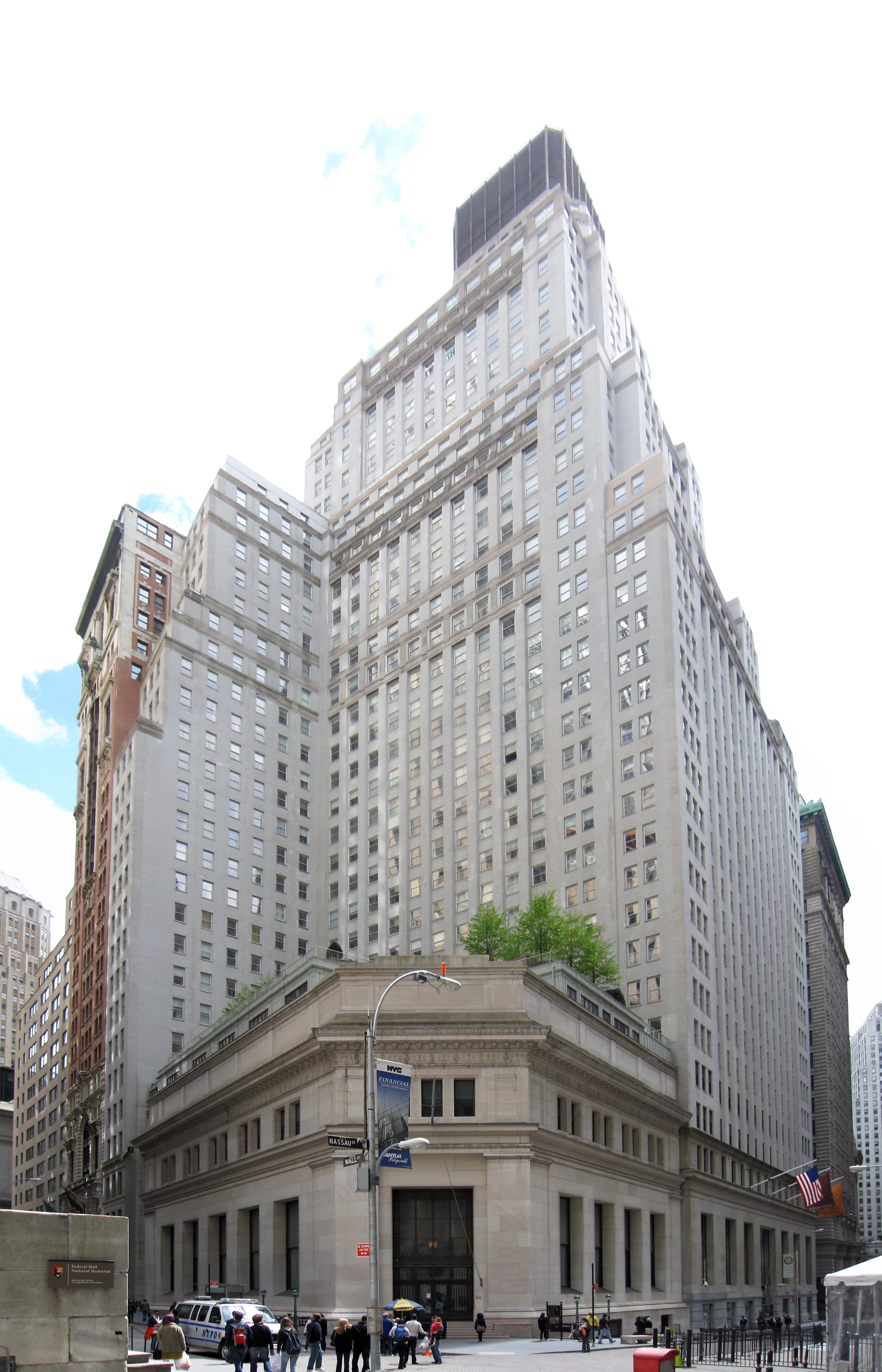
Wider view of 23 Wall Street, with 15 Broad Street behind it

J.P. Morgan & Co. became the Morgan Guaranty Trust Company in 1959 following a merger with the Guaranty Trust Company. As part of the consolidation of the two companies, the bank sought to have its headquarters in one building. Morgan Guaranty considered constructing additional stories atop 23 Wall Street as well as replacing both structures with one headquarters. A major renovation commenced in the two buildings in 1962, to prepare for their conversion into a headquarters for Morgan Guaranty, and the interior spaces of 23 Wall Street were reconfigured. The Guaranty Trust Company's old headquarters at 140 Broadway was being demolished to make way for the Marine Midland Bank Building, and some artifacts from the old headquarters were transported to 23 Wall Street. Morgan Guaranty officially moved to 23 Wall Street and 15 Broad Street in February 1964. Some of the 4,200 employees had moved into both buildings several months earlier, but the address change had not been finalized until that date.

Morgan Guaranty, which later became a subsidiary of holding company J. P. Morgan & Co., announced in 1985 that it would purchase and fully occupy a proposed tower at 60 Wall Street, a larger and more modern building two blocks to the east. Three years later, the company's operations were moved from 23 to 60 Wall Street. 23 Wall Street was renovated extensively in the 1990s as a training and conference facility for J.P. Morgan & Co. The New York Stock Exchange (NYSE), American Stock Exchange (AMEX), and J.P. Morgan & Co. considered a plan to create a financial "supercenter" on the block containing 23 Wall Street in 1992. The supercenter, to be developed by Olympia and York and designed by Skidmore, Owings & Merrill (SOM), would have consisted of a 50-story tower above two 50,000-square-foot (4,600 m^{2}) trading floors. All the buildings on the block would have been demolished except for 23 Wall Street. After Olympia and York withdrew from the proposed supercenter because of its own financial difficulties, a team composed of J.P. Morgan & Co., Lewis Rudin, Gerald D. Hines, and Fred Wilpon took up the project. The NYSE withdrew from the project in 1993.

By the late 1990s, the NYSE proposed constructing a trading floor across from their existing building, in or next to 23 Wall Street. The NYSE proposed expanding its existing building eastward above Broad Street, closing it to vehicular traffic, and creating a glass-covered atrium above the street. The plan would have demolished several adjacent buildings for a new facility while retaining 23 Wall Street as a visitor center. The initial plan for the atrium by HLW International was widely criticized, as was a modification by Hugh Hardy, and the NYSE ultimately dropped the atrium proposal. During 2000, the NYSE signed an agreement with the New York City and New York state governments to acquire the block to the east, demolishing all structures except for 23 Wall Street to make way for a 50-story skyscraper designed by SOM. After the September 11 attacks in 2001 resulted in the collapse of the World Trade Center nearby, the NYSE maintained its intention to build a trading floor at 23 Wall Street. The NYSE ultimately decided against the proposal. After Chase Manhattan Bank and J.P. Morgan & Co. merged, JPMorgan Chase also considered buying 23 Wall Street, but it decided instead to move its headquarters to Midtown Manhattan in 2001.

=== 21st century ===
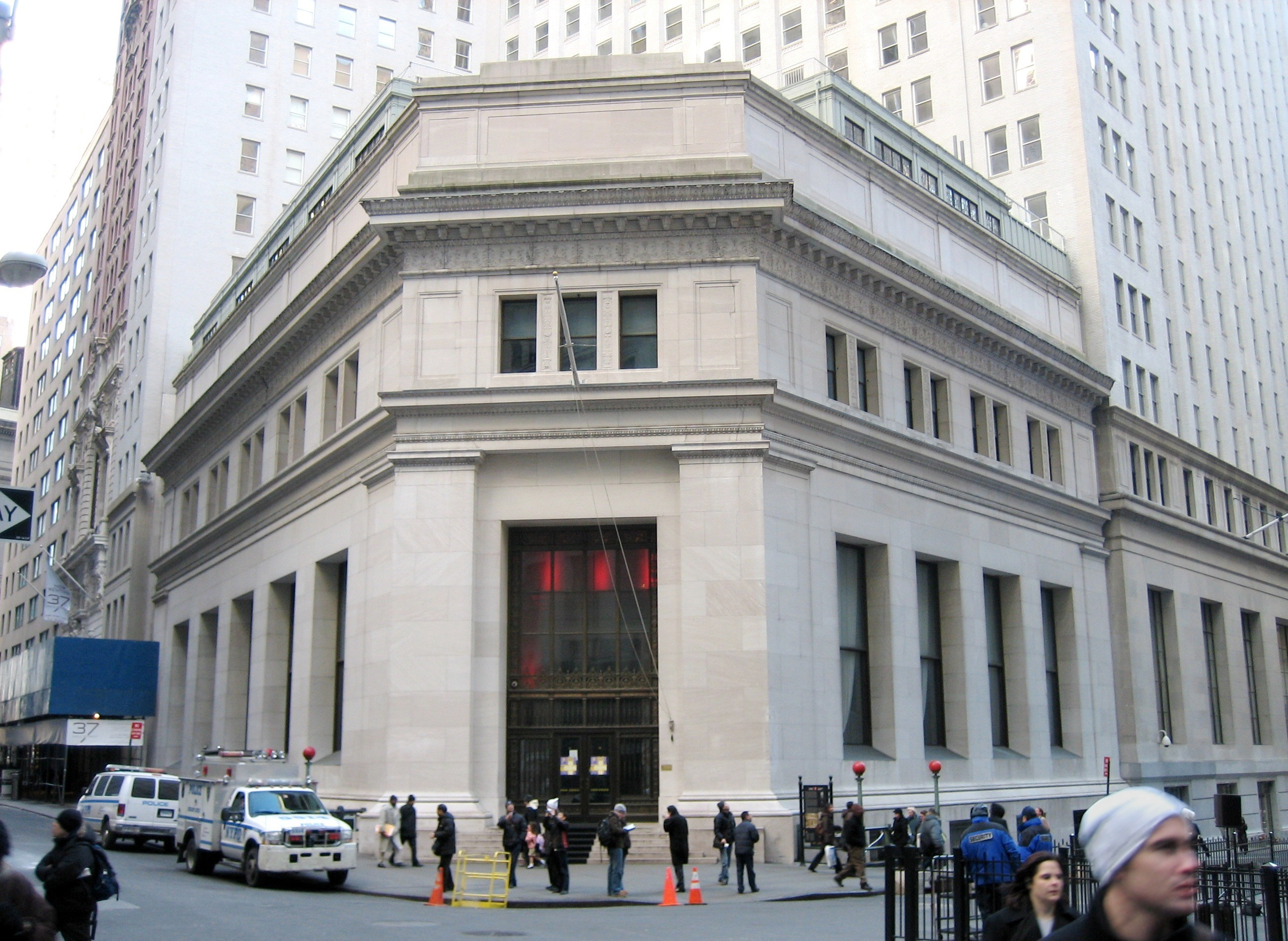
Main entrance to 23 Wall Street seen in 2007

23 Wall Street and the adjacent 15 Broad Street were sold in 2003 for $100 million to Africa Israel and Boymelgreen. Later that year, nonprofit group Wall Street Rising convinced the owners of 23 Wall and 15 Broad Streets to light the buildings during the night. The two buildings were slated to become a condominium development, "Downtown by Philippe Starck", named for its designer, Philippe Starck. Starck made the roof of 23 Wall Street into a garden and pool, accessible to the residents at 15 Broad Street. The New York Law School had planned to move into 23 Wall Street. but the proposal was canceled in September 2004 after over a year of negotiations. Afterward, the developers began looking for retail tenants to move into 23 Wall Street. Africa Israel gained full control of the two buildings in 2007. Subsequently, they used 23 Wall Street for film shoots and broker events.

23 Wall Street was sold to a partnership of the China International Fund and Sonangol Group in 2008. The building remained unoccupied for several years, even though its brokers wished to lease the interior to a luxury retailer. In 2015, a Latitude 360 entertainment center was proposed for the space, though neighborhood residents strongly opposed the plan. Sam Pa, believed (Note: Pa held no official position within either the China International Fund or the Sonangol Group, but The Real Deal New York magazine cites Pa as having been heavily involved with the companies.) to be a key leader of the China International Fund and the Sonangol Group, was arrested the same year. In early 2016, as part of a settlement over the 15 Broad Street apartments, Africa Israel was ordered to complete the renovation of 23 Wall Street. Shortly afterward, artist Simon Birch planned to run a temporary art exhibition in the unused space, but the show was postponed and ultimately canceled because of a lack of funding.

Jack Terzi of JTRE Holdings contracted to purchase 23 Wall Street in August 2016 for $140 million. That December, Terzi began negotiating with clothing retailer Uniqlo, which wanted to lease 100,000 square feet (9,300 m^{2}) in the building, though the lease negotiations later stalled. After several months, the building's sale had still not been finalized, leading Terzi to sue Sonangol in late 2017. Terzi had refused to place a down payment for the building because Sonangol would not guarantee that none of the money would be given to Pa. In 2018, Sonangol's request to dismiss the lawsuit was denied, and fitness chain Blink Fitness signed a lease for 20,000 square feet (1,900 m^{2}) in the basement; this lease was also unsuccessful. As part of a court settlement in January 2020, Terzi signed a 99-year lease for the building instead of buying it. Terzi had been given a period of free rent. By September 2021, Sonangol claimed that Terzi had defaulted on his lease. The building was still empty as of 2026, when JTRE Holdings sought approval from the New York City Landmarks Preservation Commission (which had designated the building as a landmark) to convert the ground level into retail space.

== Impact ==
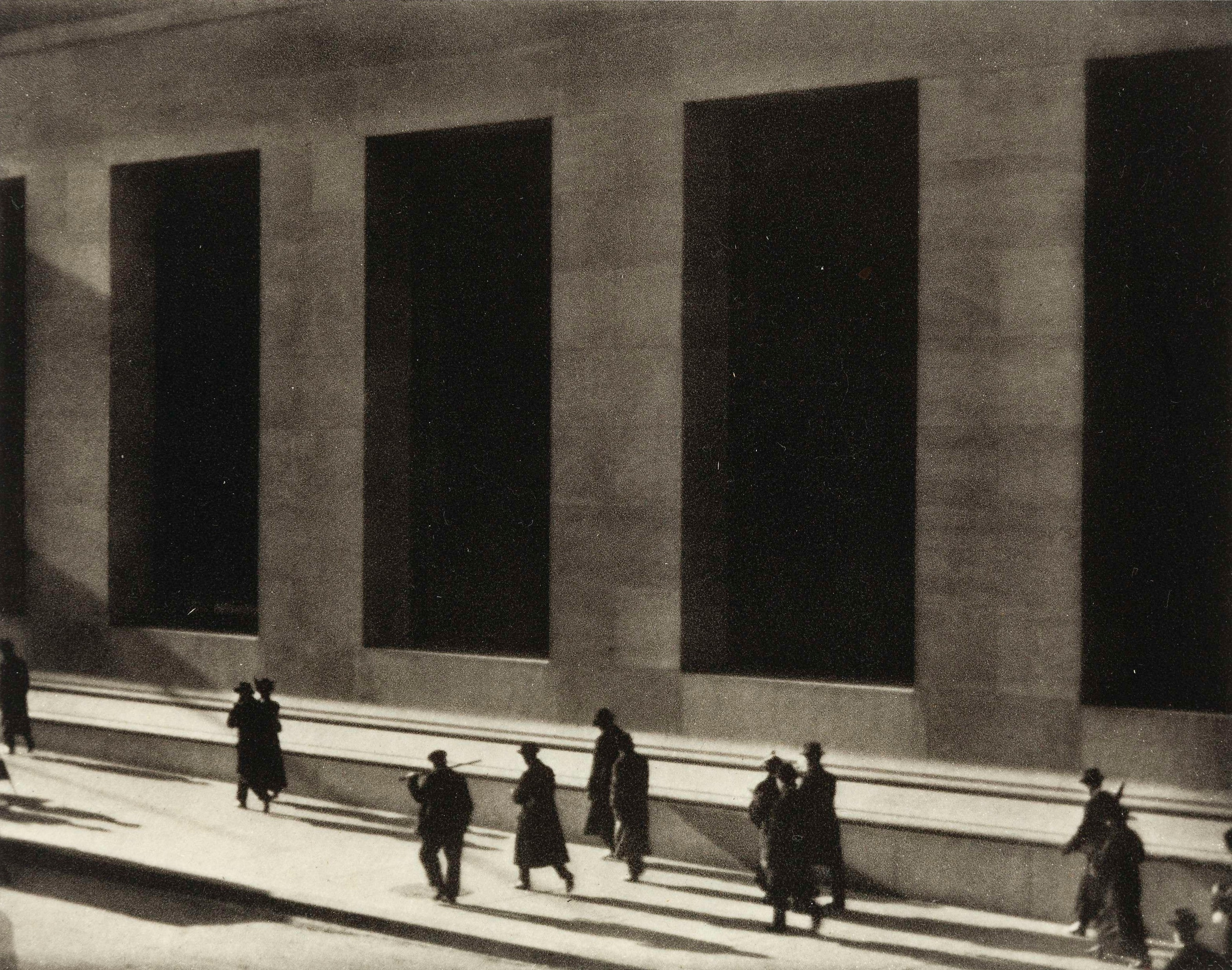
23 Wall Street in Wall Street (1915) by Paul Strand

=== Reception ===
Upon 23 Wall Street's completion, its design was generally praised. Architecture magazine wrote, "so now in the Morgan Banking House, they have established a new and high standard of artistic and practical excellence for private banks". The Real Estate Record and Guide compared 23 Wall Street to the Parthenon in Athens, and The Wall Street Journal stated that the design "gives an impressive of massiveness, strength and of beauty to the building". Architect and writer Robert A. M. Stern stated in 1983 that "its simplified Classicism was a perfect expression of the public persona" of J. P. Morgan. A history and archives consultant for J.P. Morgan & Co. considered in 2001 that the design was a "complete reflection of the personality of Pierpont Morgan". The Skyscraper Museum said in 2003 that the building "could be termed the anti-skyscraper". A reporter for the Financial Times wrote in 2004: "There is plenty of architecture with a capital A on the exterior."

23 Wall Street's plain design became a defining feature of its architecture. During the building's construction, consulting engineer W. E. S. Strong had predicted that it would be a "plain, massive structure which will be of very imposing aspect". The Sun said that "no attempt has been made in the planning of the new building to produce an elaborate or ornate structure". Time magazine wrote in 1923 that, even as structures like the New York Stock Exchange and the Chamber of Commerce "feel it necessary to label themselves quite plainly for the benefit of the man in the street", 23 Wall Street was not labeled with any name sign, only its address. A writer for The New York Times in 1930 wrote that 23 Wall Street "is impressive in its dignity, simplicity, and low height", characterizing it as one of "the big little buildings of Wall Street" along with the New York Stock Exchange Building, Federal Hall, and Trinity Church. The Times subsequently described 23 Wall Street as an "unimpressive, gray five-story building". John Tauranac and Christopher Little wrote in their 1985 book Elegant New York that the plain design was "an act of conspicuous consumption on the grandest scale", considering the site's high price.

=== Landmark designations ===
The New York City Landmarks Preservation Commission (LPC) designated the building's exterior as a landmark on December 21, 1965. In its report about 23 Wall Street, the LPC wrote: "It is a fine marble building in perfect scale with its neighbors, at the north end of Broad Street, which widens at this point to create the illusion of a small square." It was one of the first landmarks to be designated by the LPC in Manhattan. Subsequently, 23 Wall Street was listed on the National Register of Historic Places in 1972. In 2007, the building was designated as a contributing property to the Wall Street Historic District, a NRHP district.

=== Media depictions ===
23 Wall Street has been depicted in several media works. Shortly after its completion, the building was pictured in the photograph Wall Street (1915) by Paul Strand. The Whitney Museum of American Art described the photograph, taken from Federal Hall, as notable for "abstract formal patterns and structures". The building has been used for film shoots, such as for the 2012 film The Dark Knight Rises, where it depicted the fictional Gotham City Stock Exchange. Part of the 2014 film Teenage Mutant Ninja Turtles was also filmed at 23 Wall Street.

== See also ==
- List of New York City Designated Landmarks in Manhattan below 14th Street
- National Register of Historic Places listings in Manhattan below 14th Street
