= Frieze =

Wide central section part of an entablature

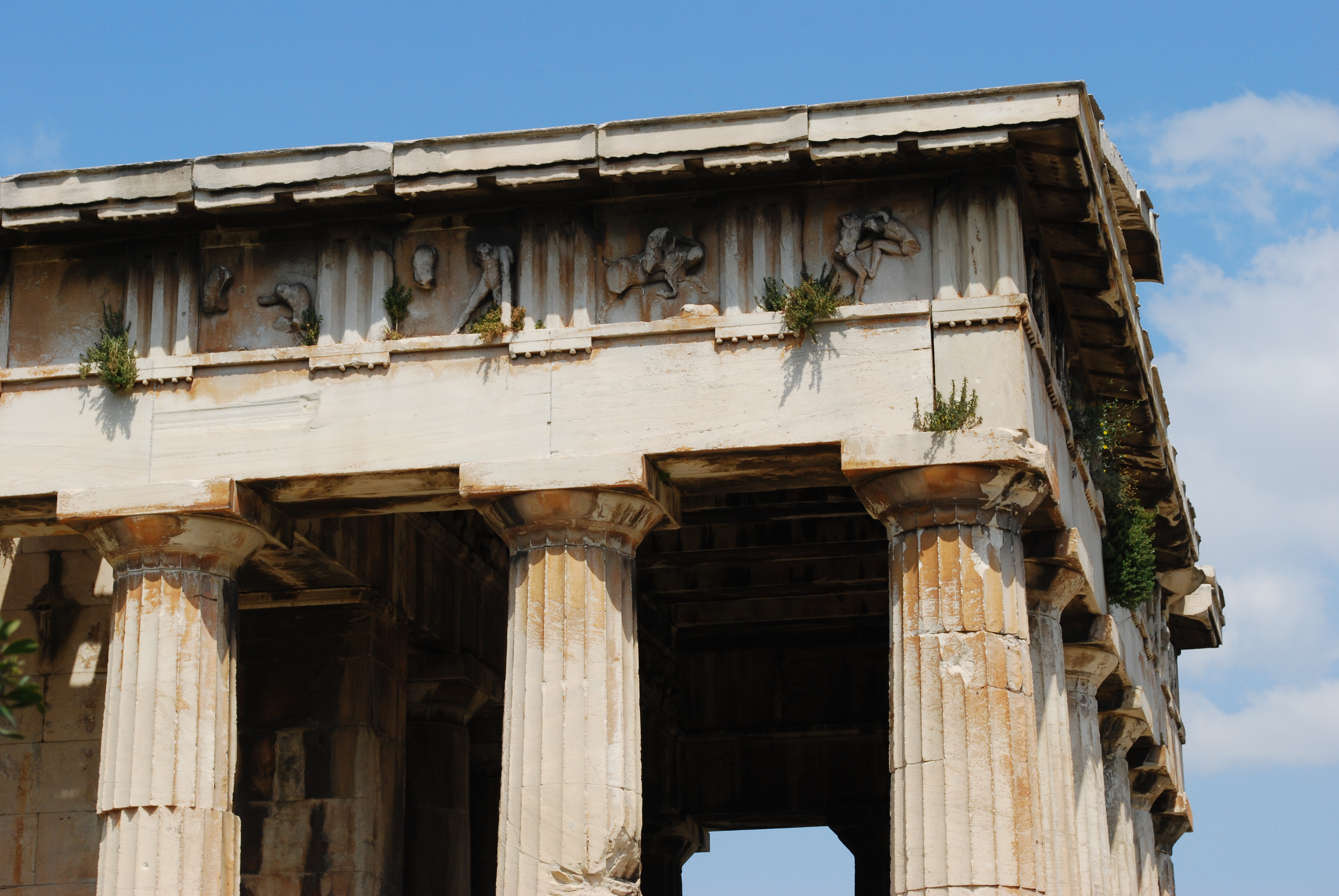
Doric frieze at the Temple of Hephaestus, Athens (449–415 BCE).

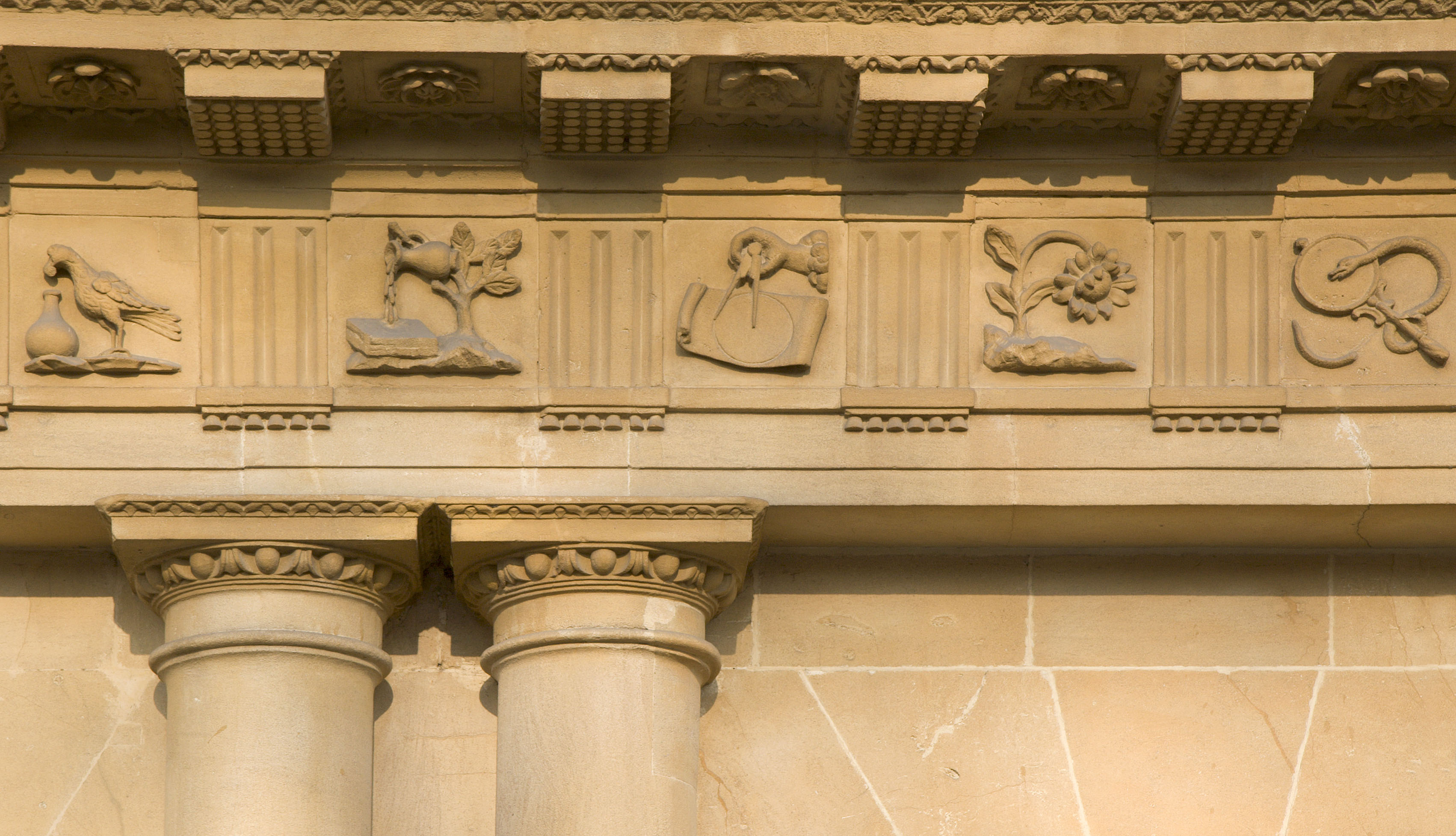
The Circus (Bath), UK. Architectural detail of the frieze showing the alternating triglyphs and metope. (John Wood, the Elder, architect)

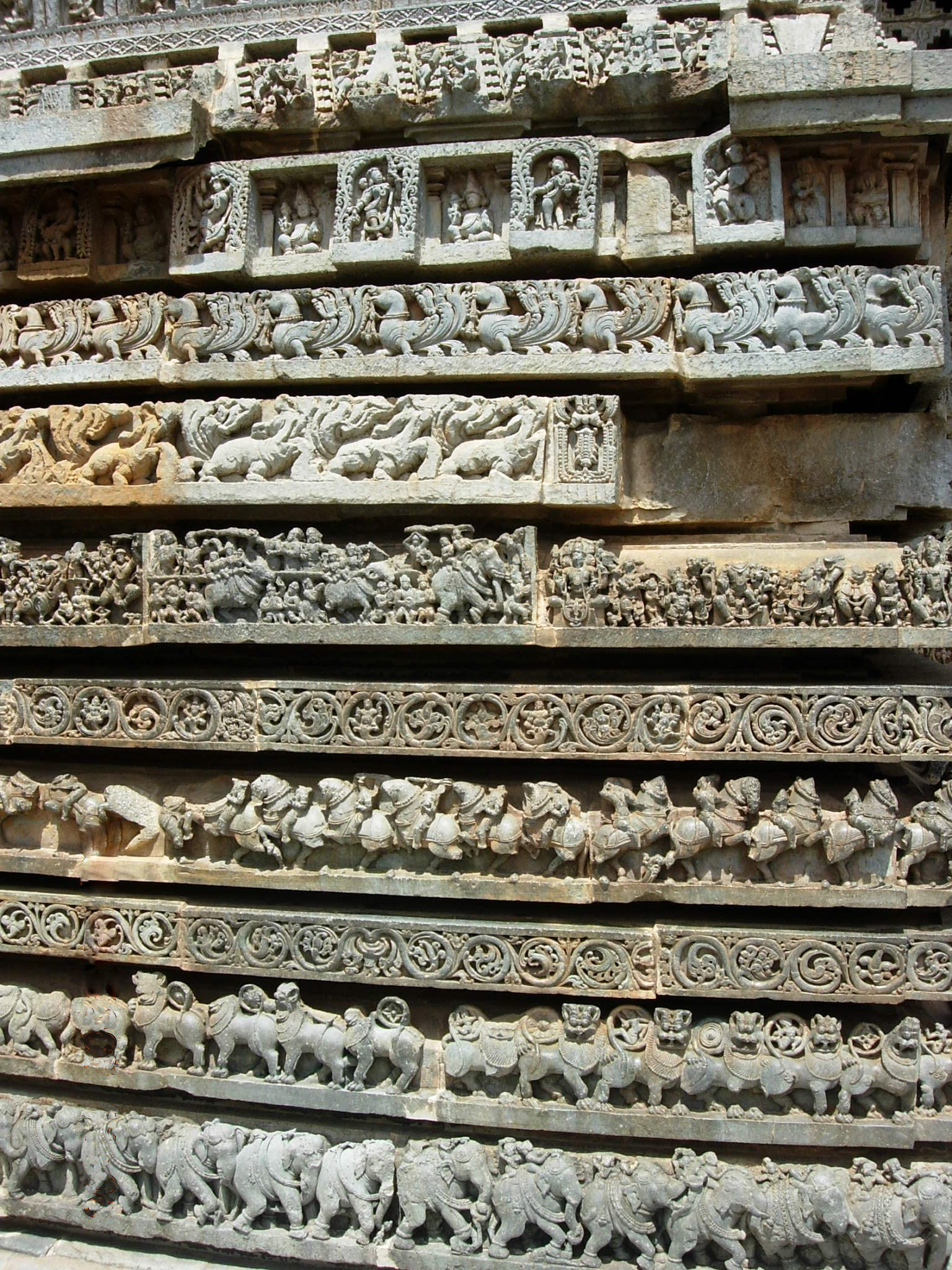
Frieze of animals, mythological episodes at the base of Hoysaleswara temple, India

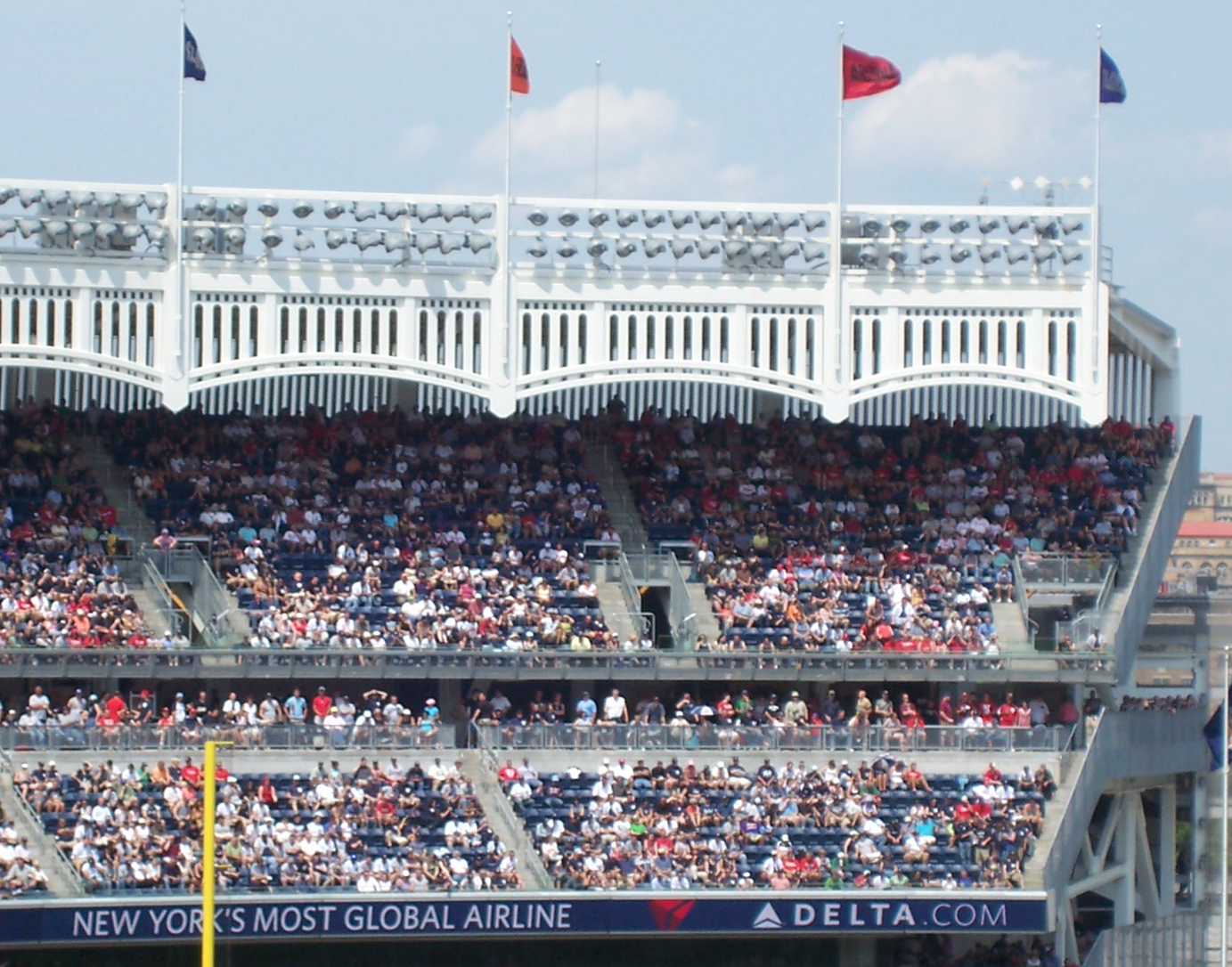
What is described as "frieze" on the roof of Yankee Stadium

In classical architecture, the frieze /friːz/ is the wide central section of an entablature and may be plain in the Ionic or Corinthian orders, or decorated with bas-reliefs. Paterae are also usually used to decorate friezes. Even when neither columns nor pilasters are expressed, on an astylar wall it lies upon the architrave ("main beam") and is capped by the moldings of the cornice. A frieze can be found on many Greek and Roman buildings, the Parthenon Frieze being the most famous, and perhaps the most elaborate.

In interiors, the frieze of a room is the section of wall above the picture rail and under the crown moldings or cornice. By extension, a frieze is a long stretch of painted, sculpted or even calligraphic decoration in such a position, normally above eye-level. Frieze decorations may depict scenes in a sequence of discrete panels. The material of which the frieze is made may be plasterwork, carved wood or other decorative medium.

More loosely, "frieze" is sometimes used for any continuous horizontal strip of decoration on a wall, containing figurative or ornamental motifs. In an example of an architectural frieze on the façade of a building, the octagonal Tower of the Winds in the Roman agora at Athens bears relief sculptures of the eight winds on its frieze.

A pulvinated frieze (or pulvino) is convex in section. Such friezes were typical of 17th-century Northern Mannerism, especially in subsidiary friezes, and much employed in interior architecture and in furniture.

The concept of a frieze has been generalized in the mathematical construction of frieze patterns.

== Ancient examples ==
Achaemenid friezes

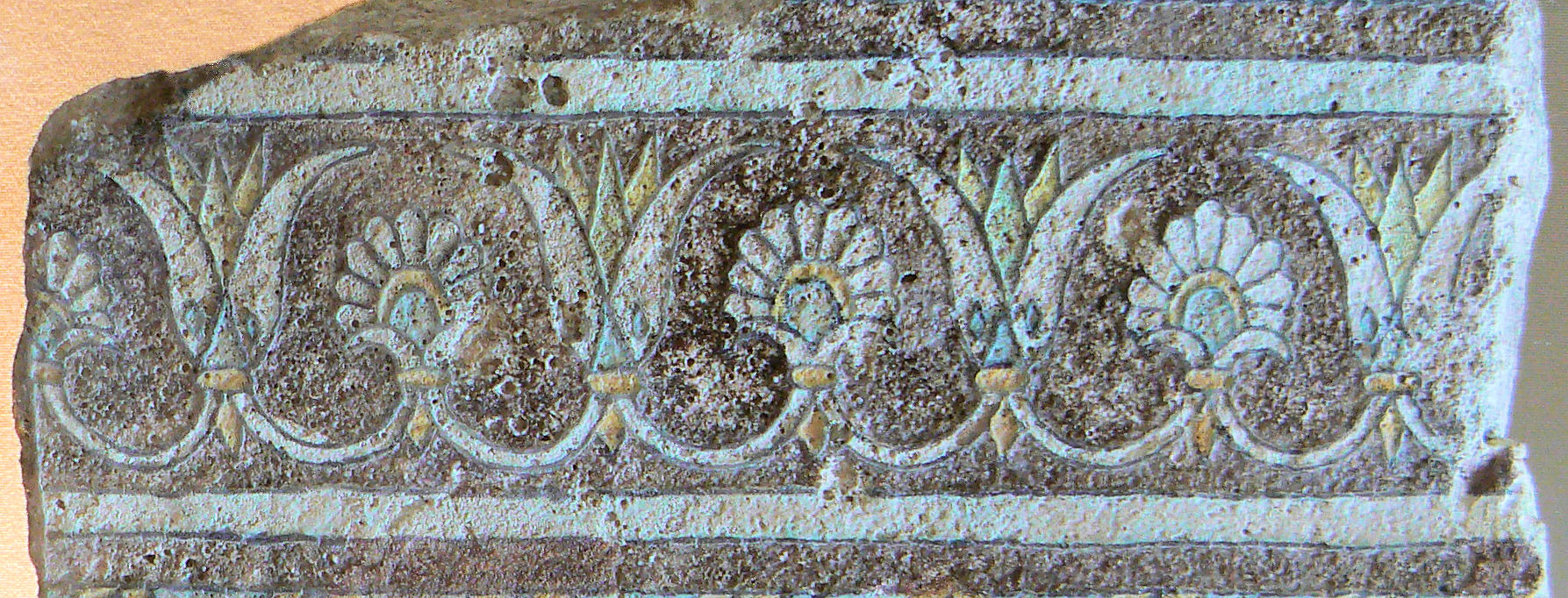
Achaemenid Lotus and Palmette scroll

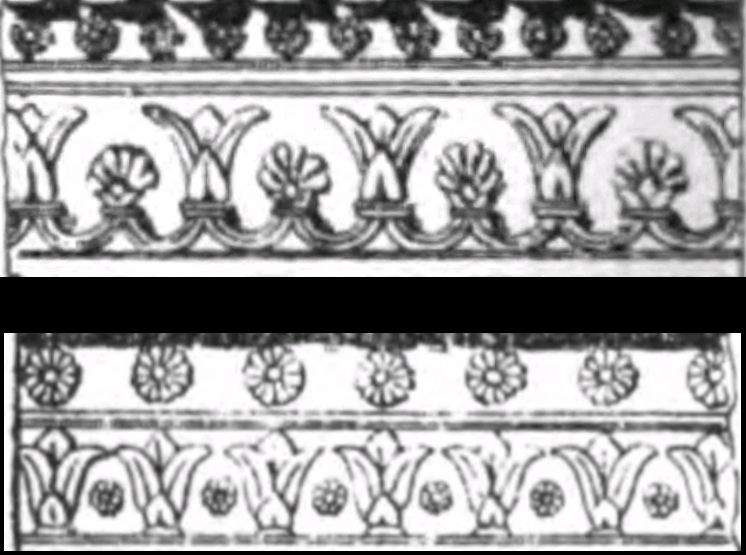
Achaemenid frieze designs at Persepolis.
Greek friezes

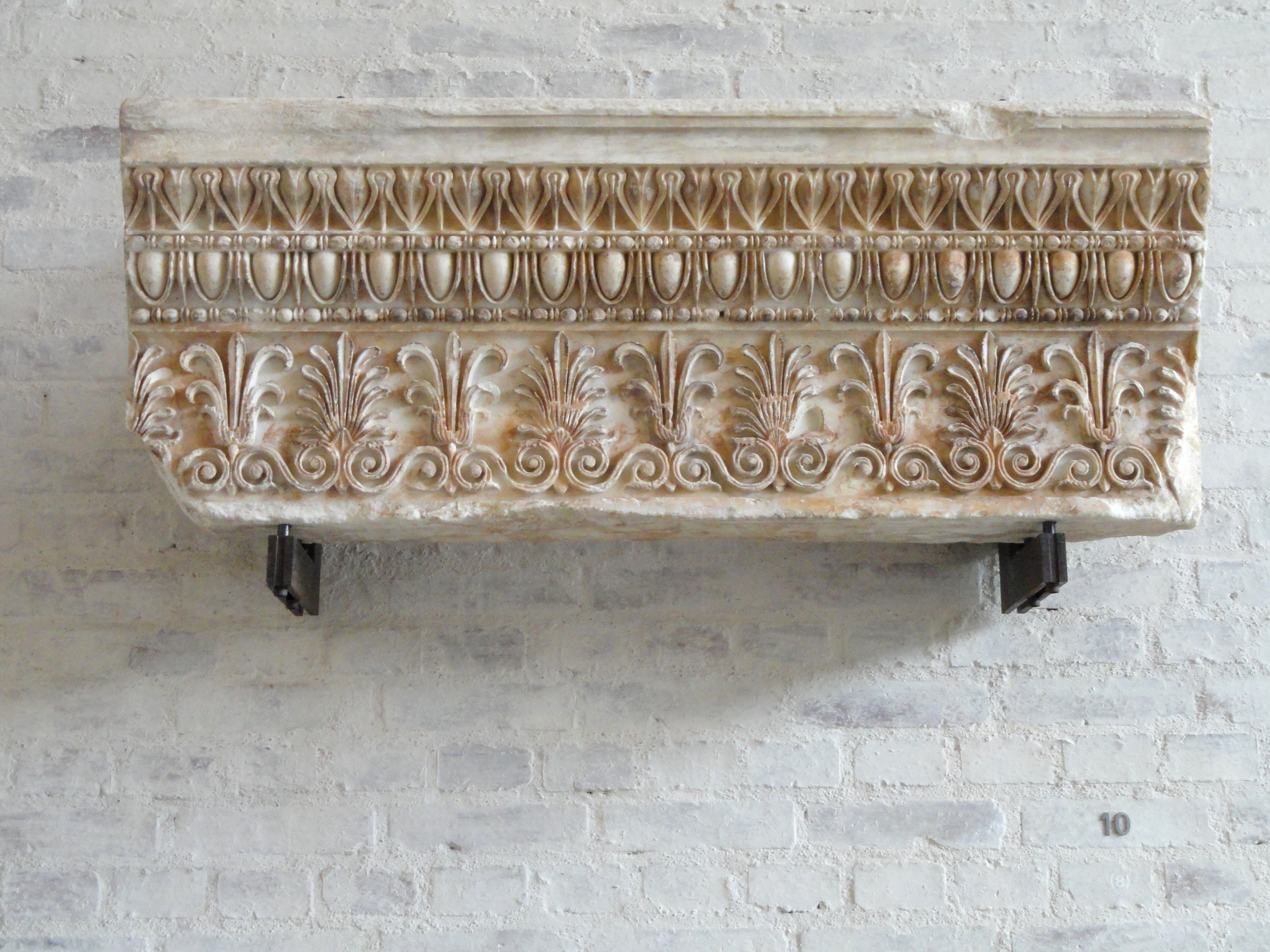
Ionic frieze of the Erechtheum (Athens), 421–406 BCE

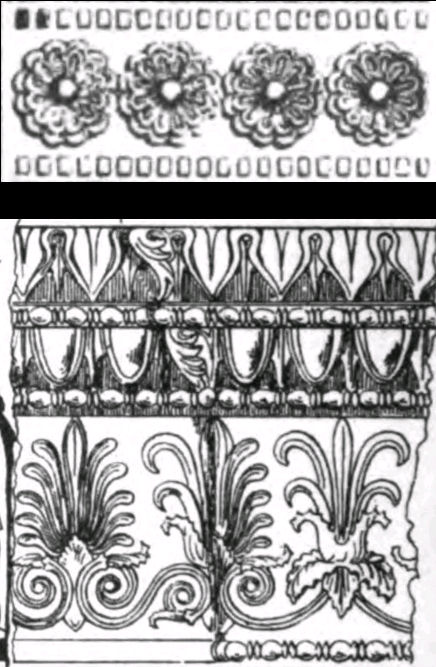
Top: Kyanos frieze from Tiryns. Bottom: Frieze of the Erechtheion in (Athens), 4th BCE

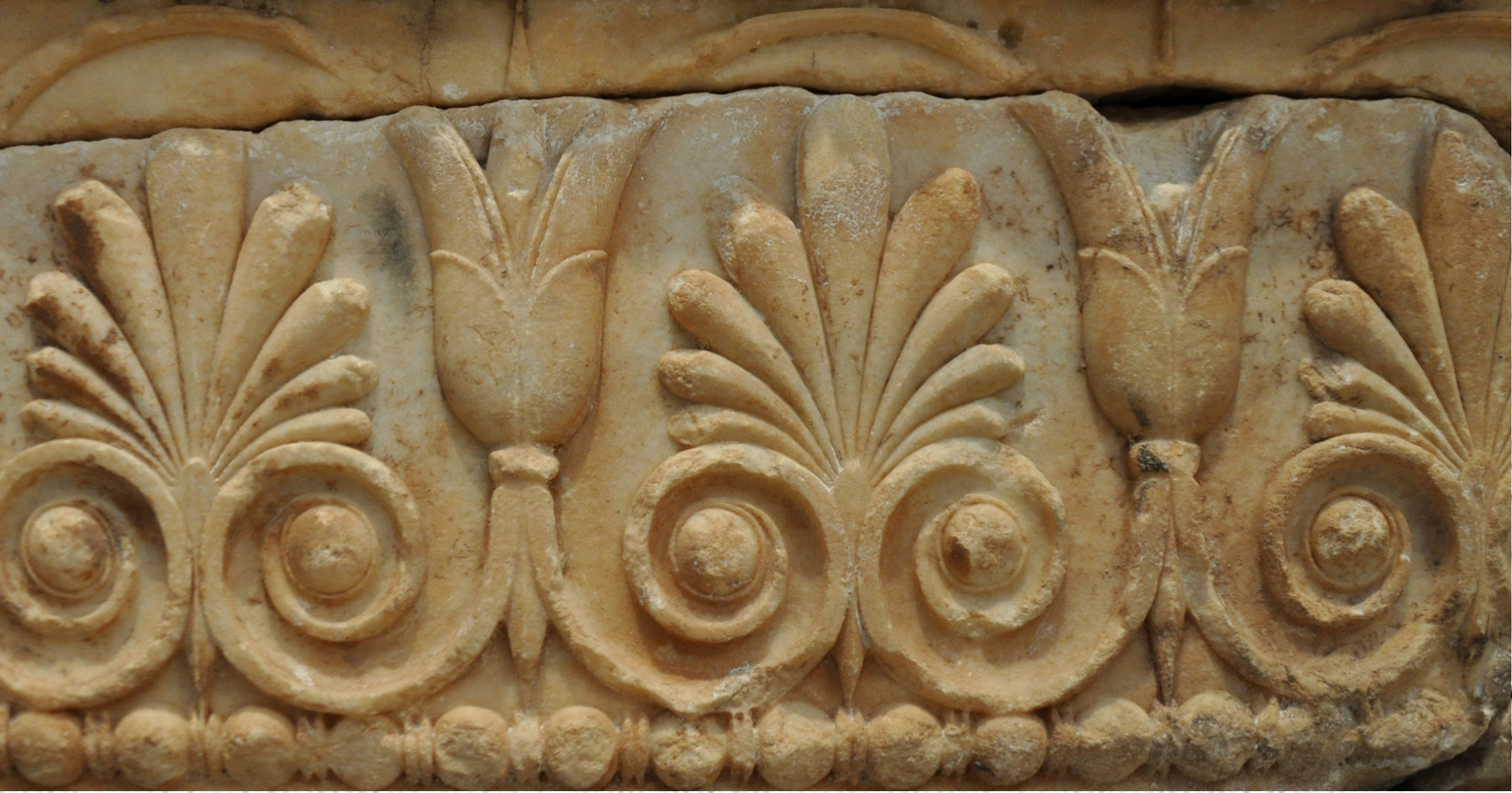
Frieze from Delphi incorporating lotuses with multiple calyxes
Indian friezes

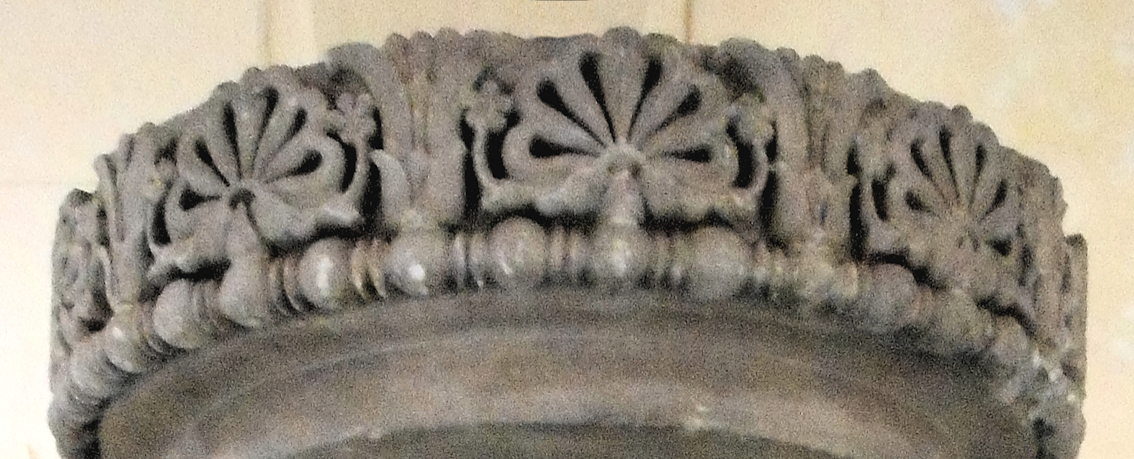
Frieze of the lost capital of the Allahabad pillar, with two lotuses framing a "flame palmette" surrounded by small rosette flowers, 3rd BCE

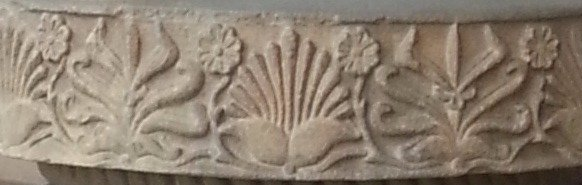
Rampurva bull capital, detail of the abacus, with two "flame palmettes" framing a lotus surrounded by small rosette flowers, 3rd BCE

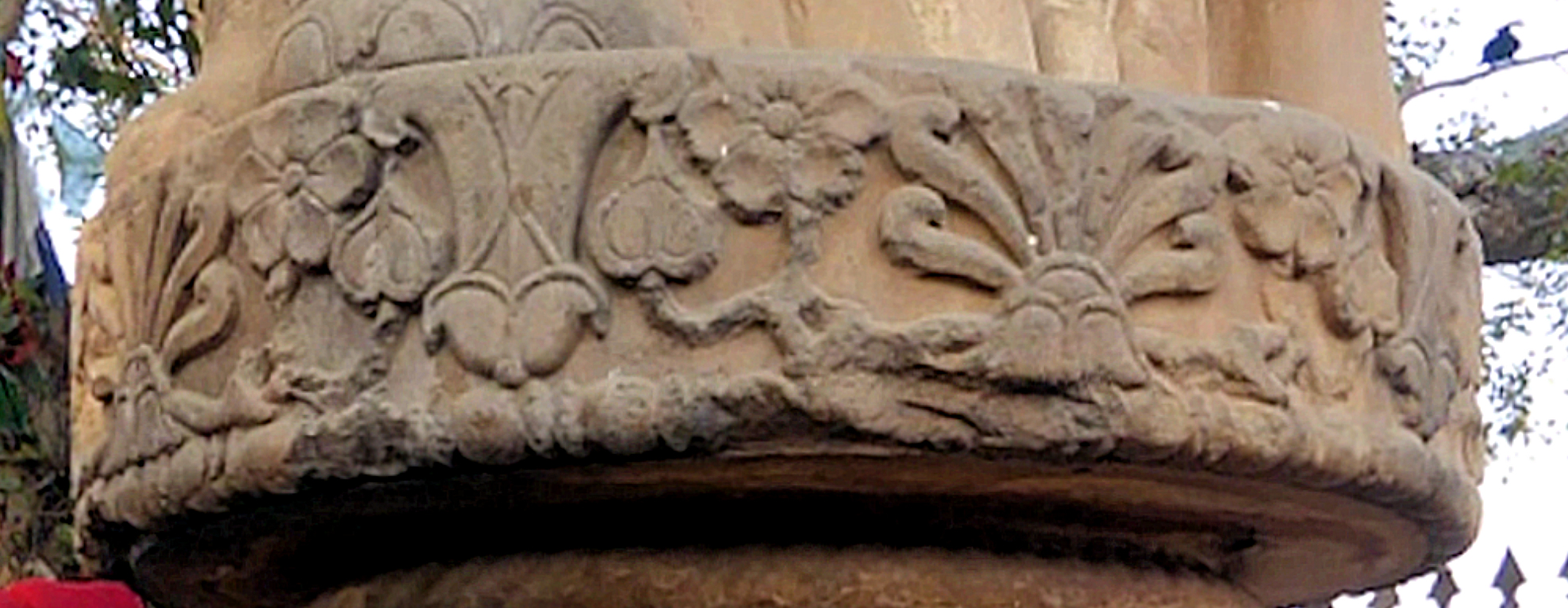
Frieze of the Sankissa elephant, 3rd century BCE
