= China International Fund =

Investment company

- Native name: 中国国际基金有限公司
- Industry: Infrastructure
- Founded: 2003; 23 years ago
- Headquarters: Queensway, Hong Kong
- Area served: Developing countries
- Website: chinainternationalfund.com

China International Fund (CIF) is a Chinese-owned group of Hong Kong investors that describes its major businesses as including "large-scale national reconstruction projects and infrastructure construction in developing countries". The CIF and its associated companies in Hong Kong and Singapore invested upwards of $US 20 billion mainly in unstable African dictatorships. They have made agreements with the Angolan and Guinean governments to explore for various resources in those countries. These agreements will result in billions of dollars of money being invested in the two countries. The Company is under the suspicion of being a state-owned company because "key personnel have ties to Chinese state-owned enterprises and government agencies."

== Structure ==
The United States-China Economic and Security Review Commission issued a report in July 2009 on investments of Dayuan, CIF and its subsidiaries in Africa, Latin America and the U.S.A.. China International Fund is owned to 99% by Dayuan International Development, which has about 30 subsidiaries. The report called these companies the "88 Queensway Group", after the Hong Kong address for headquarters of most subsidiaries. Files about the CIF does not give hard evidence of government ownership. On the other hand, Chairwoman Lo Fong Hung is director of Sonangol Sinopec International Ltd., a joint venture between the state-owned oil companies Sinopec of China and Sonangol of Angola.

== Angola ==
In a conversation between American Ambassador Dan Mozena and Chinese Ambassador Bolum Zhang, Zhang said, "the CIF made many promises to Angola, and that while the company has a large presence in Angola, its weak management and lack of leadership have stalled many of the projects. Zhang said that as the CIF is a 'private company,' the Chinese embassy does not actively participate or monitor its relationship with Angola. He added that CIF continues to benefit from the Hong Kong-based owner's 'close relationship' with President Dos Santos." It was involved in the construction of the Angola International Airport.

== Guinea ==
In October 2009, the military junta that ruled Guinea made a mining-and-infrastructure deal with China International Fund. CIF planned to invest at least $US 7 billion in a partnership to develop the country's mining of mineral resources, including diamonds, iron ore, oil and especially bauxite. In September 2011, Mohamed Lamine Fofana, the Mines Minister following the 2010 election, said that the government had overturned the agreement.

== Zimbabwe ==
CIF has investments in Zimbabwean gold and platinum refining, oil and gas prospecting, fuel refining, and residential development.

=== Sino Zim Development ===
At least two companies share the name Sino Zim Development, both operated by CIF-affiliated individuals. One or both are involved in the Zimbabwean diamond industry.

One is a joint venture registered June 15, 2009, in Singapore, with among its directors Lo Fong Hung. According to Singaporean records, this Sino Zim is wholly owned by two companies based in the British Virgin Islands.

The other Sino Zim Development is registered in Zimbabwe. Its directors include both Hung and Veronica Fung, a business associate often reported to be Sam Pa's wife or girlfriend. Zimbabwe CIO documents list Pa himself as director of the Zimbabwe-based Sino Zim, however CIF denied this in a 2012 letter to Global Witness, describing Pa as merely a consultant.

=== Alleged political action ===
According to Central Intelligence Organisation (CIO) reports leaked by 100Reporters and Global Witness, Pa and Fung provided pickup trucks, T-shirts, campaign materials, diamonds, and money to the CIO as part of what these reporting organizations describe as CIF's, Sino Zim's, and Pa's involvement in Robert Mugabe's 2013 re-election campaign, as part of a larger, multinational effort to support Robert Mugabe's administration. Sources within the CIO told Global Witness this money was being used for "Operation Spiderweb", a collection of covert activities including a smear campaign designed to discredit Prime Minister Tsvangarai, Finance Minister Biti, and Industry Minister Ncube.

The CIO documents outline a series of movements of goods and payments between Zimbabwe, Angola, and Hong Kong as follows:

- On April 4, Fung took 3,000 carats of diamonds from Marange to Angola.
- On April 8, two men left Zimbabwe with 800 carats of "clear stones" to meet "Mr. Sam Pao [sic] on behalf of the Project."
- On April 14, one of the men from the April 8 movement reported back to Zimbabwe with a US$3 million from Pa and US$2 million from General Manuel Dias Jr. (better known by his nickname "Kopelipa").
- On May 4, China Sonangol, a Chinese-Angolan oil company headquartered in the same office as CIF, deposited a US$41 million check guaranteed by "Mr. Sam Pa" for "projects of special interest."
- On May 10, Fung and a Colonel H. Muchena delivered 12,000 carats of diamonds to the address of the CIF headquarters at 88 Queensway.
- On May 16, China Sonangol and Sam Pa delivered 4,000 carats of diamonds to General Kopelipa, among other payments.

In their 2012 letter to Global Witness, CIF described money paid to Mugabe's government as "legitimate business reasons such as the payment of taxes, license fees etc." and denied financing the CIO.

== Literature ==
- U.S.-China Economic & Security Review Commission, The 88 Queensway Group: A Case Study in Chinese Investors' Operations in Angola and Beyond, by Lee Levkowitz, Marta McLellan Ross, and J.R. Warner, July 10, 2009, PDF.
- Alex Vines/Lillian Wong/Markus Weimer/Indira Campos: Sede de Petróleo Africano Petrolíferas Nacionais Asiáticas na Nigéria e em Angola, Chatham House-report, January 2011.
