= Wall Street (photograph) =

Photograph by Paul Strand

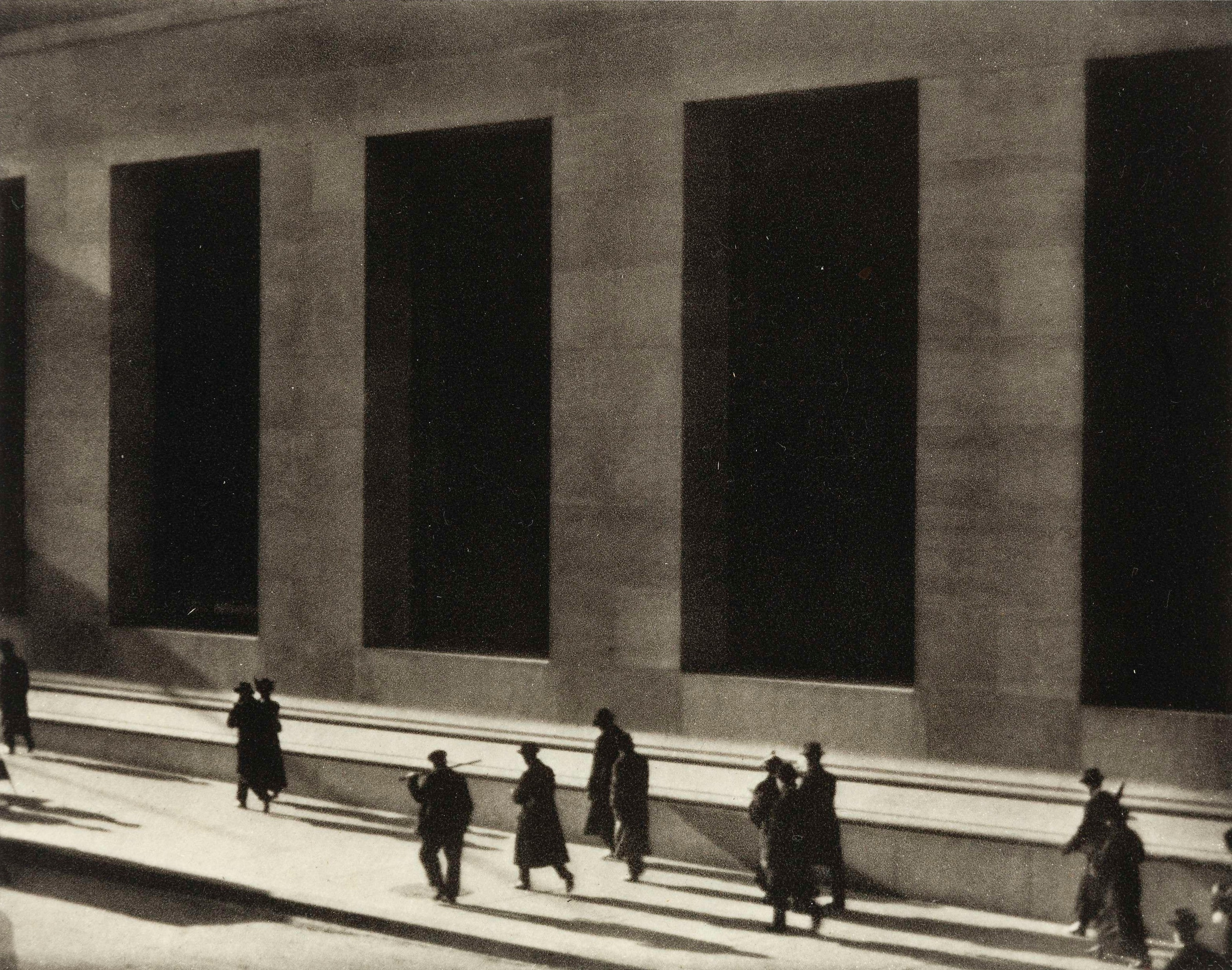
- Artist: Paul Strand
- Year: 1915
- Type: Photogravure & Platinum Print
- Location: Philadelphia Museum of Art and Whitney Museum of American Art

Wall Street is a platinum palladium print photograph by the American photographer Paul Strand taken in 1915. There are currently only two vintage prints of this photograph with one at the Whitney Museum of American Art (printed posthumously) and the other, along with negatives, at the Philadelphia Museum of Art. This photograph was included in Paul Strand, circa 1916, an exhibition of photographs that exemplify his push toward modernism.

It depicts a scene of everyday life in Manhattan's Financial District. Workers are seen walking past the J.P. Morgan & Co. building in New York City on the famous Wall Street, from which the photograph takes its name. The photograph is famous for its reliance on the sharpness and contrast of the shapes and angles, created by the building and the workers, that lead to its abstraction. This photograph is considered to be one of Strand's most famous works and an example of his change from pictorialism to straight photography. Strand moved from the posed to portraying the purity of the subjects. It is one of several images that stand as marks of the turn to modernism in photography.

== Background ==
In 1907, as a young teen, the artist, Paul Strand, enrolled in New York's Ethical Culture Fieldston School. There, Strand was under the tutelage of documentary photographer Lewis Hine. Hine introduced Strand to the modernist photographer Alfred Stieglitz. Stieglitz was heavily influential in the art world at the time, pushing for photography to be considered an art form and opening his own gallery, the 291 Gallery, with another influential photographer Edward Steichen, to promote modernist art. Stieglitz's colleagues were striving to receive acceptance for photography as a form of art. Stieglitz would become a mentor and artistic comrade of Strand, with both influencing each other for the rest of their careers.

With Stieglitz's influence, Strand explored the pictorialist style, creating works with soft focus, and posed scenes. Photographs aimed to look like paintings. Around 1915, Strand and Stieglitz sought to change their aesthetics and made the march toward straight photography. Stieglitz pushed Strand to involve real-life subjects and less manual manipulation of the print and utilized the style that was innate to the methods and materials of photography. Strand interpreted this request from Stieglitz and created this new style that incorporated high contrasts, clean lines, and emphasis on shape. These elements come from how Strand captured the real life and movements of subjects, not how he posed or manipulated them.

== Technique ==
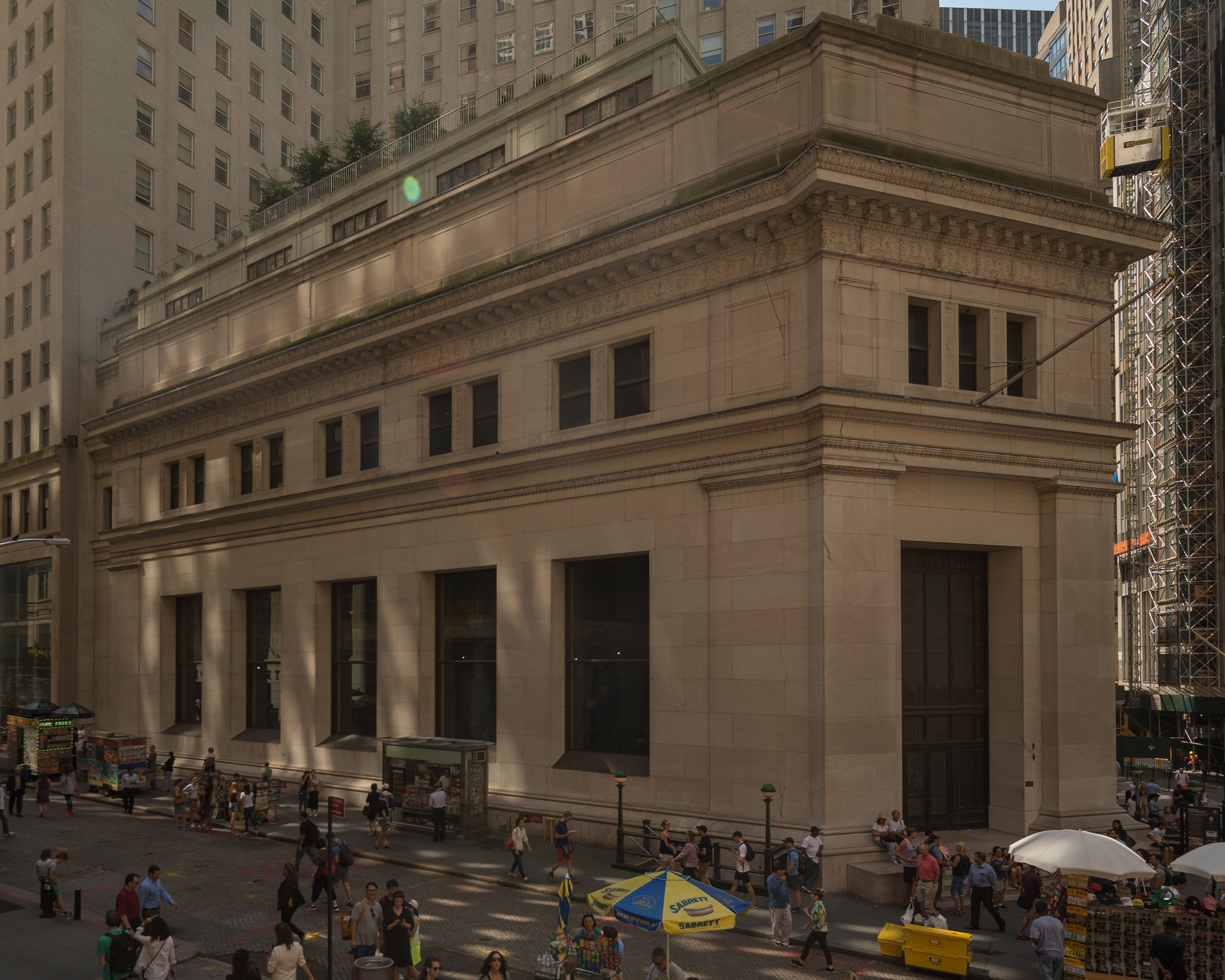
The building in 2017

This photograph depicts 23 Wall Street, the J.P. Morgan building in New York City. Strand photographed "people hurrying to work past the banking building" situated on Wall Street, from which the photo takes its name. the subject depicted is a real-life subject without manipulation. The depiction of the real nature of the medium and the subject is an example of straight photography. There is no focal point, with the lines converging off of the frame of the image. The financial building takes up the majority of the frame, and emphasis is placed on the strong shapes created by its architecture. The workers are included in the image, but are faceless and are trumped in size by the massive square shapes from the building they walk past. Also, the workers are captured in motion which on film makes them appear blurry. This aesthetic that Strand creates in Wall Street is his break toward the modern, the straight photography, demonstrating that pictorialism is no longer part of his aesthetic. Strand captured the building with clean, sharp lines. The building is covered in the high contrast, chiaroscuro. It is heavily in the shadows, but still creates an overwhelming presence over the people that walk past it. These people are also shrouded in the contrast made evident with the clean lines and black and white nature of his photos and photography as a medium. The people jump from their places, being the dark figures in the light of the sun that beams in from the left of the frame.

Strand fills the image with his recognizable aesthetic. The photo is platinum print, one of the materials frequently used by photographers of the time. Strand was unique in how he printed his photos. As stated on the George Eastman House website section Notes on Photography, Strand would make large prints from small negatives. He also left them in their matte condition that was inherent with platinum print. With his printing techniques, he "added a richness to the image." As with the time, the photo is entirely black and white. There is a heavy contrast with the black and white areas of the photo. Strand creates diagonal shapes that pull emphasis to subject of the building and away from the people.

== Aspects ==
Having taken Hine's class at the Ethical Culture Fieldston School, social change became important to Strand and appeared often in his art. As a pupil of Hine, Strand learned of the social aspect his work could have. With Wall Street, he sought to portray a social message. He captured the faceless people next to the looming financial building in order to give a warning. Strand shows "the recently built J.P. Morgan Co. building, whose huge, dark recesses dwarf the passersby with the imposing powers of uniformity and anonymity." The people cannot escape the overwhelming power that this modern establishment will have on their future and the future of America. He warns us to not be the small people that look almost ant-like next to this building that has a massive amount of control over the American economy.
