= Sonangol Sinopec International =

Chinese-Angolan petroleum company

Sonangol Sinopec International Limited
- Logo of Sonangol Sinopec International Limited

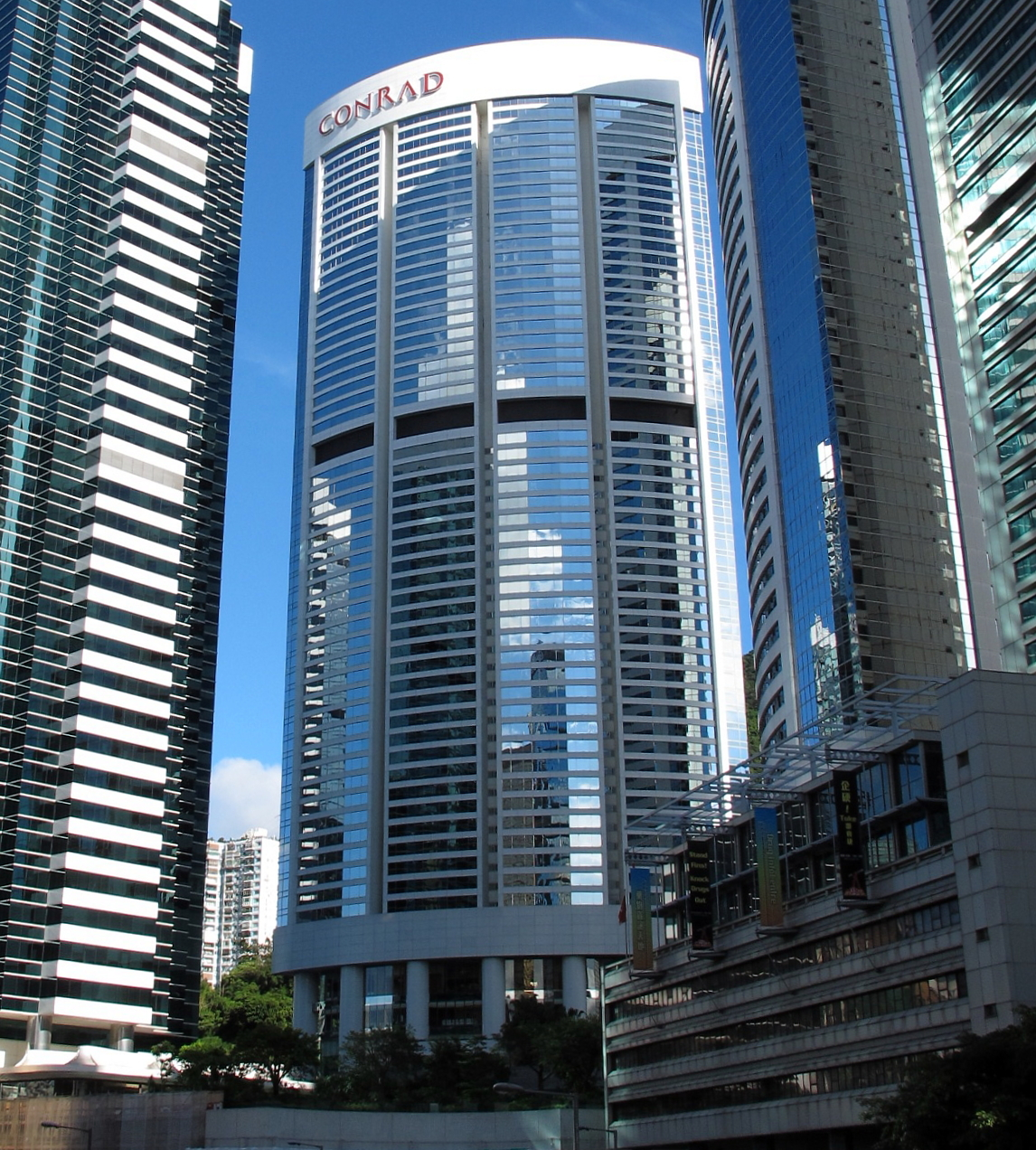
- Two Pacific Place at 88 Queensway, where the company is headquartered
- Industry: Petroleum
- Founded: September 2004; 22 years ago
- Headquarters: Tenth floor Two Pacific Place, 88 Queensway, Hong Kong
- Key people: Wang Xiangfei (CFO); Francisco Gonçalves (Vice president); Lo Fong Hung (director)
- Subsidiaries: SSI 31 Limited; SSI 32 Limited

Sonangol Sinopec International Limited (SSI) is a Chinese-Angolan petroleum company created in 2004 that is part of the Hong Kong-based 88 Queensway group. It is engaged in the oil and gas operations in Angola through the ownership of various oil blocks.

== History ==
Chart showing owning entities of Sonangol Sinopec International Ltd as of the company's founding in 2004.

SSI was created in September 2004 as a joint venture between Cayman Islands registered Sinopec Group subsidiary Sinopec Overseas Oil & Gas Limited (SOOGL), China Sonangol International Holding Limited (CSIH), and Dayuan International Development Limited. CSIH had been founded only a month earlier and possessed no assets of its own, while Dayuan changed its name from Beiya later that year and both CSIH and Dayuan were 88 Queensway group companies. SOOGL owned a controlling 55% stake, with Dayuan and CSIH as minority partners with 31.5% and 13.5%, respectively.

Despite being pushed for primarily by Sonangol under CEO Manuel Vicente, this arrangement left Sonangol, and therefore the state of Angola, with only 4.05% ownership of SSI through its 30% stake in CSIH; the rest was split between the Chinese state, Chinese businessman Wu Yang, and New Bright International Development. The last of these was owned by Lo Fong Hung and by Veronica Fung Yuen Kwan, the wife of Sam Pa, a Chinese-born citizen of Angola living in Hong Kong whose connections in China and Angola are believed to have helped lubricate SSI's early deals. Hung is director of SSI (and of dozens of other Queensway companies), while her husband Wang Xiangfei is chief financial officer. Yang and Pa have apparent ties with both the Chinese intelligence apparatus and with the Angolan government, including Sonangol's executive leadership.

They got the loan, we paid Shell […] It was, let's say, 800-something [million dollars]. And after that, later on…we called Sinopec.

— Manuel Vicente

In 2006, SSI was selected by Sonangol to participate in funding the construction of an oil refinery in the port city of Lobito. The Lobito Oil Refinery was expected to have a total cost of US$ 3 billion, employ 8,000 people, and have a capacity of 240,000 barrels per day. However, an agreement was never ultimately reached between Sinopec and the Angolan government. Sinopec's plan called for 80% of the output to go to foreign markets despite Angola regularly suffering its own shortages of refined petroleum products. Manuel Vicente told Angolan media, "We cannot construct a refinery just to make products for China," while Chang Hexi, the Chinese economic counselor in Angola, stated the company was simply disinterested in the project. SSI was ultimately uninvolved in the refinery's construction, which would ultimately not begin until 2015, and would then be paused due to lack of funding until 2021.

SSI vice president Francisco Gonçalves was among the Angolan businessmen and government officials implicated through the Panama Papers in 2016. Leaked emails reveal him taking bribes from Monaco-based consultancy firm Unaoil, described as a "corruption factory", totalling about US$3.5 million as part of a scheme to gain Swiss equipment supplier Sulzer favorable deals with SSI's parent company, Sonangol."

We need to be able to bring FG on board as he appears to be involved in a big part of the business.

— Robert Bald, Unaoil employee, leaked 2011 email

Seeking to expand its upstream capabilities, on March 8, 2010, Sinopec announced an agreement to purchase a 55% SSI stake for US$2.46 billion. This would be Sinopec's first direct acquisition of overseas assets, and China received some Western criticism for it, which it rebuffed as hypocritical.

== Operations ==
The primary business of SSI is in holding non-operator equity of oil concessionary zones, known as oil blocks, off the coast of Angola. Per Decree-Law No. 5/01, Sonangol E.P. is the national oil concessionary of Angola; that is to say it is the issuer of equity in all petroleum production zones in the country.

SSI oil assets in Angola
Oil asset	SSI stake (%)	Acquisition year	Operated by	Reserves (million barrels)	Known investment (US$ billions)	Production start	Major well	Depth at drill sites (meters)
Block 18	50	2004	BP	1,000	1.4	October 2007	Greater Plutonio	1,200-1,500
Block 15/06 (SSI 15)	25	2006	Eni S.p.A. 35%, Sonangol P & P 15%, TotalEnergies 15%, Falcon Oil 5%, Gemas 5%	1,500	1.1	September 2021	Cabaça Norte	500
Block 17/06 (SSI 17)	27.5	2006	TotalEnergies 26%, Sonangol E.P. 24%, Somoil 10%, Falcon Oil 5%, ACR 5%, Partex 2.5%	1,000	1.1	October 2009	Gardenia and Begonia	600-1,900
Block 18/06 (SSI 18)	40	2006	Petrobras 30%, Sonangol EP 20%, Falcon Oil 5%, Gemas 5%	700		November 2009	Magnesium-01	750-1,750
Block 31*	15**	2013**	BP 26.67%, Sonangol E.P. 25%, Sonangol P&P 20%, Statoil 13.33%, Sonangol Sinopec 10%, SSI 31 Ltd 5%			December 6, 2012	Plutão, Saturno, Vênus, and Marte	1,500-2,500
Block 32***	20	2014	TotalEnergies	650		2019	Kaombo Ultra-Deep	1,400-1,950
*5% through Sonangol Sinopec International 31 Limited **5% before 2013 ***through Sonangol Sinopec International 32 Limited

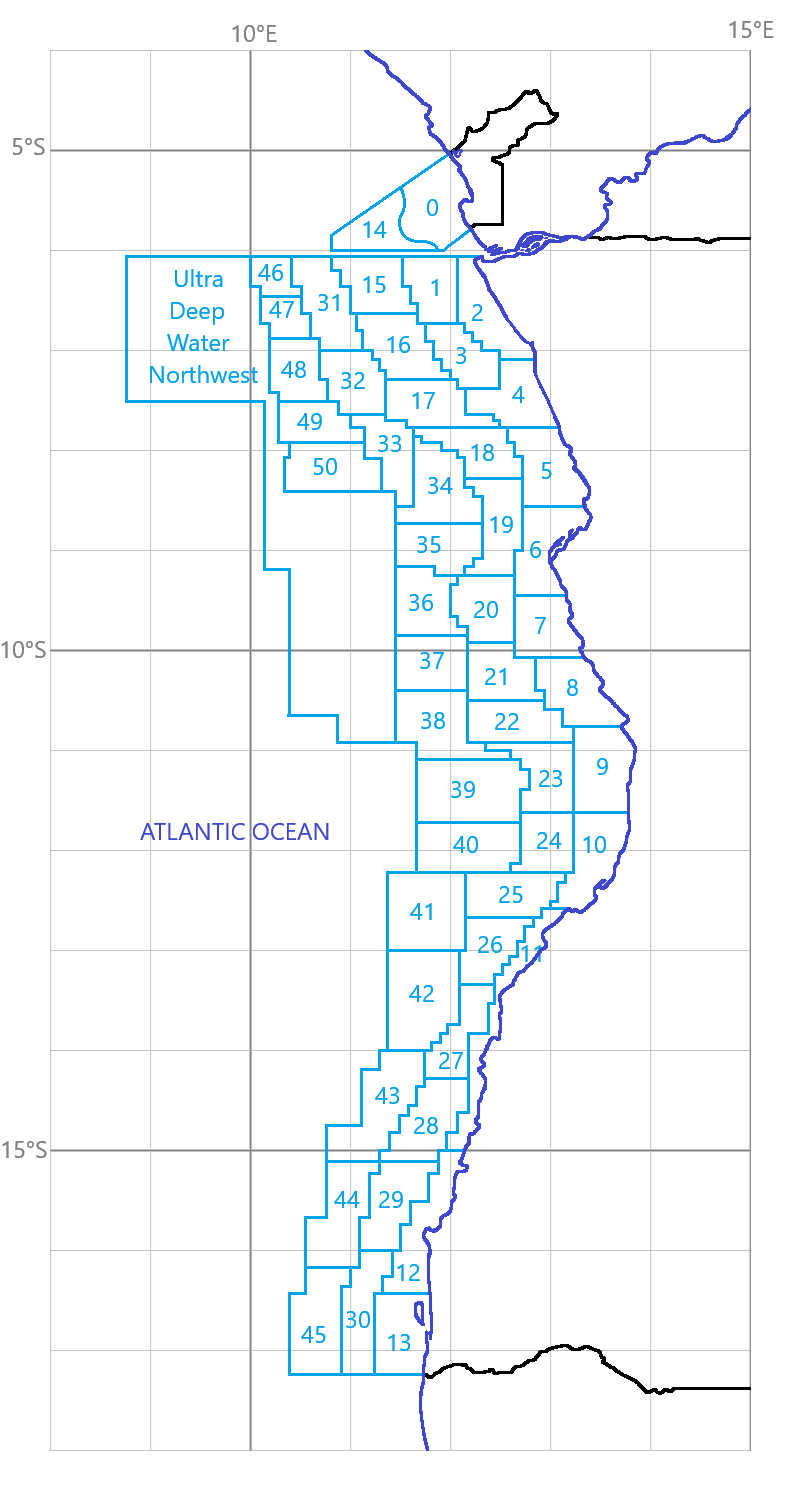
Map of Angolan offshore oil blocks

In December 2004, a 50% stake in deepwater block 18 held by Royal Dutch Shell was returned to Sonangol under executive decree 148/2004. This equity had been promised to the Indian company ONGC-Videsh but, due to Sonangol's political preference for doing business with a Chinese company as well as SSI's much higher US$725 million bid, SSI received the stake instead. Angolan oil minister Desidério Costa formalized the transfer in February 2005. Using Sinopec as a guarantor for loans from international and Chinese banks, SSI raised US$1.6 billion to develop production infrastructure on the oil block.

The shallower eastern half of block 18 started producing oil in October 2007, with production reaching as high as 240,000 barrels per day. The success in block 18 encouraged the Sinopec group to increase its involvement in the Angolan oil industry.

In May 2006, SSI acquired equity in several new oil licenses: 20% in Block 15/06, operated by Eni S.p.A. subsidiary AGIP, 27.5% in Block 17/06, operated by TotalEnergies, and 40% in Block 18/06, operated by Petrobras. The amounts paid in the 2006 bidding round were the highest per-acre bids to date anywhere in the world. SSI bid over US$2 billion for two sites, outbidding both ExxonMobil and British Petroleum by hundreds of millions of dollars. The blocks were renamed SSI 15, SSI 17, and SSI 18.

In 2007, SSI received equity in the highly lucrative shallow water Blocks 3/05 and 3/05A south of Soyo. These blocks had been held by Total prior to their revocation in the aftermath of the Angolagate arms dealing scandal and handed over to CSIH before their transfer to SSI to be held for only a brief period.

After a purchase by parent company China Petrochemical Corporation of Marathon Oil's stake in Block 31 in 2013, Sonangol Sinopec International 31 Ltd, an SSI subsidiary, owns a total of 15% of the block. SSI 31 Limited previously owned 5%.

SSI owns 20% of Block 32 through its subsidiary Sonangol Sinopec International 32 Limited. Block 32, in deep waters 260 kilometers from Luanda, is served by the Kaombo Ultra-Deep Offshore Project, operated by Total. When the project was launched in 2014, the Kaombo well was expected to produce 230,000 barrels per day. Other SSI 32 holders include Esso subsidiary Esso Exploration and Production Angola (Overseas) Limited (15% stake) and Galp Energia (5%).

== See also ==
- Africa–China economic relations
