= Alonzo Bertram See =

American businessman and social critic

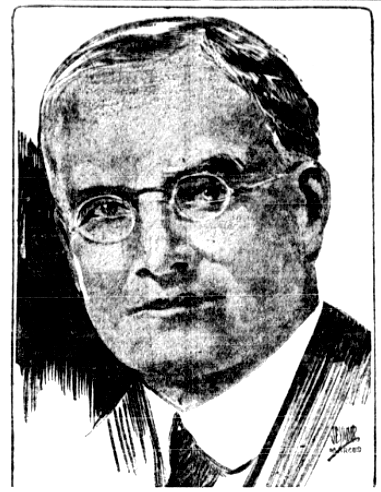
Newspaper illustration of A.B. See

Alonzo Bertram See (October 25, 1849 – December 16, 1941) was an American businessman and social critic. He was the son of Benjamin and Lavania See. He founded the A. B. See Elevator Co., an elevator repair company, in 1883 in Brooklyn, New York. His company was reportedly the first to develop the predecessor to modern destination dispatch elevators. The company was acquired by Westinghouse in 1938.

Alonzo Bertram See was also an anti-feminist. Notably, he responded to a request for contributions to an endowment fund, made in 1922 by Adelphi College for women, by saying "If I had my way I would burn all the women's colleges in the country... Of all the fool things in the world I think college for women is the worst. When they graduate from the colleges they cannot write a decent hand. They know nothing about the English language. They are thoroughly ignorant of the things they should know...", and added, "Nothing could be better for the girls that are now in the colleges than to be taken out of the colleges and put to hard manual labor for at least a year so that there might be put into their heads some little trace of sense."

In 1937 A. B. See Elevator company was the 3rd largest elevator company in the country. See is interred at Green-Wood Cemetery in Brooklyn, New York]
