= Latitude 360 =

American restaurant chain

Latitude 360 was an American restaurant chain with entertainment options.

== Founders and key executives ==
Latitude 360 was founded by Brent W. Brown in Jacksonville, Florida, who served as its chairman and chief executive officer.

=== Board of directors ===
- Brent Brown
- Greg Garson (fired)
- Alan Greenstein, CFO
- Tim Gannon
- Michael P. Norris
- Michael G. Simon
- John C Maher
- Susan Kurland

== Controversy ==
Latitude 360 is currently under criminal investigation for bouncing employees' final paychecks. The employees were also affected when they attempted to collect unemployment benefits. The company had not been reporting these employees to the state or paying any of the associated payroll taxes collected from employees. The company currently has $88 million in current liabilities as filed in August 2015. The current market cap is less than $1M USD. On February 10, 2016, Florida's Action Jax News reporter Jenna Bourne found out from insiders that there was a substantial amount of money missing from the company.

On January 26, 2022, Brent Brown, the former CEO of Latitude 360, was arraigned (News4Jax) in federal court on 17 counts of failing to pay the IRS payroll taxes from his employees.

== Locations ==
On January 7, 2016 it was announced that the Indianapolis, Indiana and Jacksonville, Florida locations were closed due to the settlement of an eviction suit from the landlord. The company had been behind on rent since December 2012, and at the time of the suit owed $6 million in rent and associated fees. As part of the rapid closure, the employees were not paid their final paychecks. The Pittsburgh, Pennsylvania location was closed in March 2016. The establishment failed to pay its Allegheny County drink tax, and on February 29, 2016, a judge ruled that the company could be evicted from its premises in 30 days.

The Albany, New York location at Crossgates Mall was never opened; it was replaced by a Lucky Strike Lanes location.

- The 360 Grille & Bar was Latitude 360's sit-down restaurant; however, food could be purchased and eaten anywhere within the venue.
- Latitude 360 offered luxury bowling that used the latest Brunswick bowling programming, a 120-inch digital video wall, and sound system.
- The Cinegrille was Latitude 360's dine-in movie theater where consumers could dine while they watched a movie.
- Latitude 360 had a gaming area with redemption games and prizes.
- Latitude Live was a live performance theatre which sat 170-300+ people. Live bands and comedy acts were featured in this venue.
- The HD Sports Theater was similar to sports bars in Vegas.
- The Axis Bar and dance floor/stage featured weekend performances by regional bands and DJs.
- The Latitude LIT Cigar Lounge was a cocktail-style lounge with leather furniture, HD TVs, cocktails, and cigars.
