= Sam Pa =

Chinese mining magnate and fixer

- Sam Pa in 2013
- Born: February 28, 1958 (age 68)
- Disappeared: 2015
- Other names: Sampa; Samo; Sam King; SA Muxu; Xu Songhua; Xu Jinghua; Ghui Ka Leung; Samo Hui; Antonio Famtosonghiu; Sampo Menezes; Tsui Kyung-Wha
- Occupation: Businessman
- Organization: China International Fund (CIF)
- Spouse: Veronica Fung

Sam Pa is a business magnate believed to be the head of the 88 Queensway Group and numerous subsidiary companies that operate mining and resource concessions in a number of countries, notably across Africa. Pa has been the subject of controversy, allegedly propping up Robert Mugabe's ZANU-PF regime in Zimbabwe and securing business contacts on the back of a coup d'état in Madagascar and civil unrest in Guinea.

== History ==
Sam Pa is alleged to use a several different aliases. At least eight of these were listed in connection with Pa in an American Congressional report. These names include Sam Pa, Sampa, Samo, Sam King, Sa Muxu, Xu Songhua, Xu Jinghua, Ghui Ka Leung, while the United States Department of the Treasury also lists Samo Hui, Antonio Famtosonghiu Sampo Menezes and Tsui Kyung-Wha as aliases in connection with Zimbabwean sanctions.

It is unknown why Pa uses so many aliases. Attempts to research Pa's history prove inconclusive, which has led some to believe that he is a "princeling", the son of a well-connected original Chinese communist revolutionary. Reports also list one of Pa's aliases as having a Russian military background that spent time in Angola during the Angolan Civil War. It is believed that Pa first met the future Angolan President Jose Eduardo Dos Santos during his time with the Russian military. This was a relationship that he exploited after the Civil War to secure a monopoly over reconstruction projects, which allowed him to develop his business interests in China and buy a host of construction businesses such as China Steel 20 (Zhongtie 20), Guangxi Construction and Engineering, Guangxi Water and Electric, Sichuan Nanchong, Sichuan Uingshan, Fuikan Ningde, Jinghend International and others. It is also alleged by Chinese bloggers that Pa provided weapons and support during the Angolan Civil War.

== Situation in 2010 ==
Pa is said to be the President of the China International Fund (CIF) and named by an American Congressional report to be involved in what the report dubbed the "88 Queensway Group" of businesses. This is not the legal name of the group, but a nickname referring to the companies' registered address in Two Pacific Place, 88 Queensway, Admiralty, Hong Kong. Some of the businesses associated with the 88 Queensway Group include China Sonangol, Dayuan International (formerly Beiya International), and No 20 China Railways Bureau. However, it is unclear exactly how many businesses are involved in the 88 Queensway Group with over 30 companies registered to the same address with operations throughout Sub-Saharan Africa, Latin America, Southeast Asia and the United States.

Pa's involvement is often not listed in any company documents, but in a common offshore company formation practice he lists the woman believed to be his wife, Veronica Fung, as director in his place. Veronica Fung is listed as Director for at least 24 companies, including CIF and China Sonangol. Alongside Veronica Fung, Pa is also aided by the husband and wife team Lo Fung Hung and Wang Xiangfei, who also hold directorships on a number of Queensway businesses. Despite their titles of director, Lo and Wang have been described as "puppets" controlled by Pa.

As head of the China International Fund, Pa has traveled to a number of countries meeting high-ranking officials and presidents. Some noteworthy inclusions are his connections to Angolan President José Eduardo dos Santos, Zimbabwean President Robert Mugabe, Venezuelan President Hugo Chávez, Argentinean President Cristina Fernández de Kirchner and Guinean Prime Minister Jean-Marie Dore. It is also believed the Pa and CIF have business connections in Tanzania and Madagascar. Often Pa begins state level relationships at a time when a country is experiencing domestic troubles. For example, on 28 September 2009, 150 unarmed pro-democracy Guinean protestors were massacred by Guinean government troops—a week later CIF negotiated a US$7 billion deal with the regime. A similar situation occurred in Madagascar following a coup. It is thought that Pa, through CIF and its associated companies, has committed upwards of US$20 billion in investment funds, mainly in unstable African dictatorships.

One particular political connection Pa tries to keep quiet is that of his connections to the Chinese state. Commentators have stated that Pa and CIF's programmes "must have been approved by the Chinese Government". CIF and Sam Pa are positioned as a key interface in the relationship between the Angolan and Chinese states and the control of Angolan resources—all Angolan oil contracts for the Chinese State company Sinopec are controlled by CIF.

One of Pa's "puppet" directors, Wang Xiangfei, was previously a director of the China Everbright Group and currently is a non-executive director of China International Trust and Investment Company (CITIC Group), both state-owned companies in the People's Republic of China. Both China Everbright and CITIC are believed to be subordinate corporations of the PRC Ministry of State Security's Commission of Science, Technology and Industry for National Defense (COTSIND).

Another director of at least 14 companies with Pa and the 88 Queensway Group, Wu Yang, has links to the Chinese PRC Ministry of Public Security and Chinese Ministry of State Security (MSS). On company filings, Wu Yang lists his residential address as "No. 14 Dong Chang An Street, Beijing, China". This address is the headquarters for the Ministry of Public Safety (MPS), a domestic security service of the Chinese Government. Also located in this compound is a reception office for the Ministry of State Security (MSS), the primary state agency responsible for foreign intelligence activities.

== Reception ==
Sam Pa has been the subject of numerous press and internet blog reporting and his ties to Robert Mugabe's ZANU-PF were revealed in the Johannesburg Sunday Times. It is alleged that in return for diamonds and mineral resources to supply China's booming economy, Pa has provided funds and equipment to the secretive Zimbabwe Central Intelligence Organisation (CIO) to enable it to deliver an electoral victory for Mugabe and his party. Pa allegedly had been underwriting operations for the Zimbabwean Secret Service to influence the outcomes of polls in favor of ZANU-PF and thereby further secure his business dealings in Zimbabwe. In early 2010 Pa offered to match the salaries of the entire Zimbabwean Secret Service, Police and Army to ensure their support for ZANU-PF. In return, Pa's joint venture with the Zimbabwean Secret Service, Sino-Zim Development, was listed at the top of a classified ZANU-PF list of "special national interest projects".

Pa and his businesses such as CIF, China Sonangol and Sino-Zimbabwe have often been disassociated from by official Chinese representation. Chinese Foreign Minister Li Zhao Zing discouraged Argentinean President Kirchner from entering into any agreements with Sam Pa-associated businesses.

CIF and China Sonangol have had reports on their ability to plan and complete some of their projects due to difficulty in raising funds. Pa's work in Angola has been heavily criticised for non-completion, with some saying Pa's companies were "just playing a game and in the eyes of the Angolan Government have gone through process from belief to feeling cheated". Sam Pa's work on reconstructing the Benguela railway line attracted criticism from Angolan locals who quoted "The Chinese spent months getting the camp together and bringing in brand-new bulldozers. Then instead of beginning to repair the line, they dismantled it all, ate their dogs and left."

== Arrest ==
Pa was arrested at a hotel in Beijing on 8 October 2015 as part of Xi Jinping's anti-corruption campaign. As of 2024, his whereabouts were unknown.

In May 2017, the United States District Court for the Southern District of New York convicted Mahmoud Thiam of laundering $8.5 million of bribes paid by Sam Pa to him as minister of mines in Guinea in 2009 in order to award mining concessions to CIF.
