= Astylar =

Architecture without columns or pilasters

Astylar (from Gr. ἀ-, privative, and στῦλος, a column) is an architectural term given to design which uses neither columns nor pilasters for decorative purposes; thus the Riccardi and Strozzi palaces in Florence are astylar in their design, as opposed to Palladio's palaces at Vicenza, which are columnar.
