= Broad Street station (BMT Nassau Street Line) =

New York City Subway station in Manhattan

Broad Street
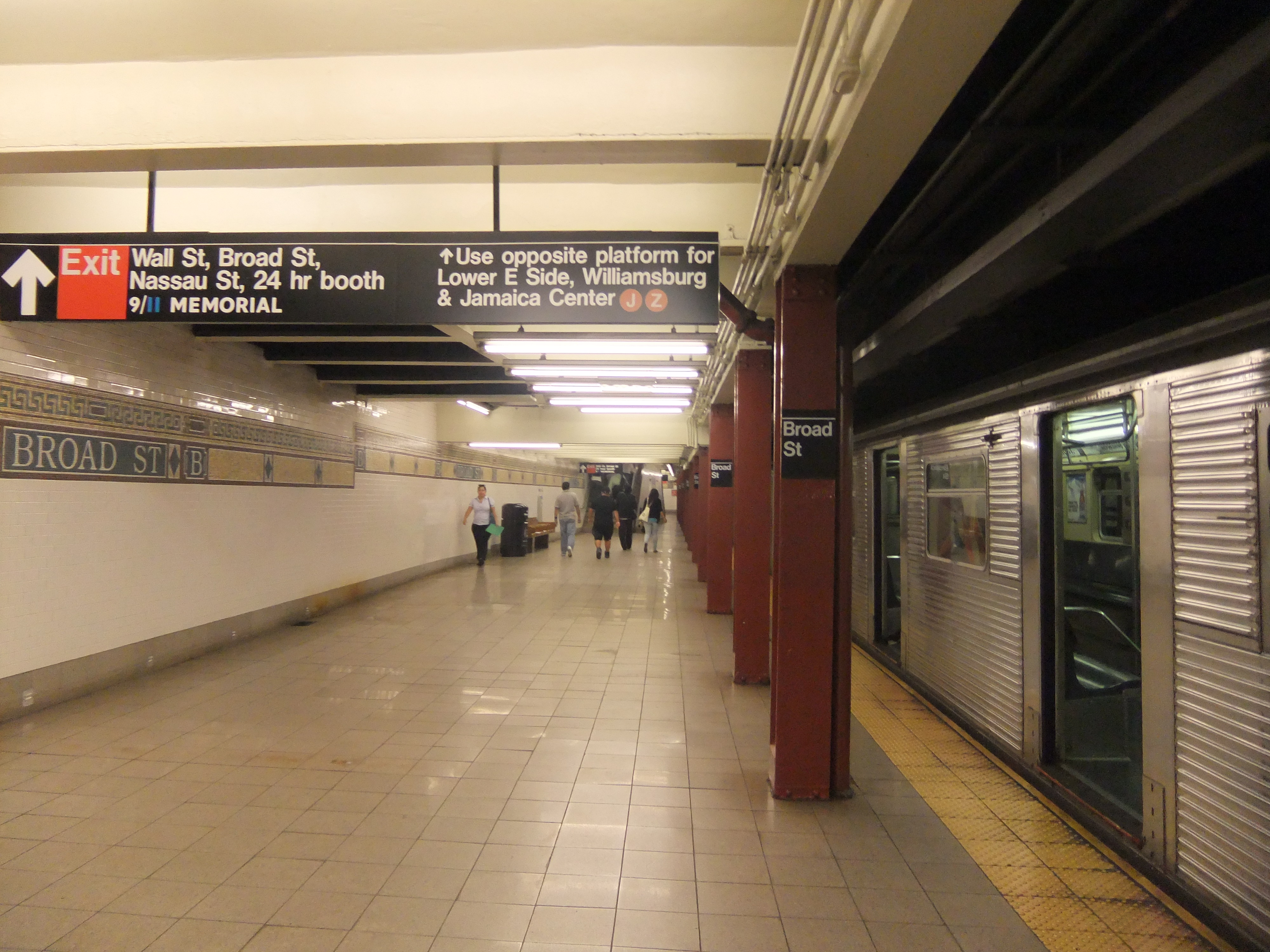
- Southbound/terminating platform

Station statistics
- Address: Broad Street and Wall Street; New York, New York
- Borough: Manhattan
- Locale: Financial District
- Coordinates: 40°42′25″N 74°00′39″W
- Division: B (BMT)
- Line: BMT Nassau Street Line
- Services: J (all times); Z (rush hours, peak direction)
- Transit: NYCT Bus: M15, M15 SBS, M55, SIM1, SIM1C, SIM2, SIM3C, SIM5, SIM15, SIM32, SIM33C, SIM34, SIM35, X27, X28; MTA Bus: BM1, BM2, BM3, BM4, QM7, QM8, QM11, QM25, QM65; Staten Island Ferry at Whitehall Terminal
- Structure: Underground
- Platforms: 2 side platforms
- Tracks: 2

Other information
- Opened: May 29, 1931; 95 years ago
- Accessible: No; planned

Traffic
- 2025: 1,399,459 ▲9%
- Rank: 240 out of 423
Services
Preceding station	New York City Subway	Following station
Fulton Street J Z toward Jamaica Center–York College	J/Z (New York City Subway service)	Terminus
Non-revenue services and lines
Preceding station	New York City Subway	Following station
	no service	Court Street Fourth Ave
Location
Location within New York City Subway
Location within New York City
Location within New York
Track layout
Street map
Station service legend
Symbol	Description
Stops all times	Stops all times
Stops rush hours in the peak direction only	Stops rush hours in the peak direction only

The Broad Street station is a station on the BMT Nassau Street Line of the New York City Subway at the intersection of Broad and Wall Streets in the Financial District of Manhattan. It serves as the southern terminal for J trains at all times and for Z trains during rush hours in the peak direction.

The station was built as part of the Dual Contracts, signed between the Brooklyn Rapid Transit Company (later reorganized as the Brooklyn–Manhattan Transit Corporation, or BMT) and the city in 1913. The Nassau Street Line was one of the last lines to be completed under the Dual Contracts, and construction did not proceed until James Walker was elected as mayor of New York City in 1926. This station opened on May 29, 1931, as part of the final portion of the Nassau Street Line. Despite being under Broad and Nassau Streets, with Wall Street as the cross-street, this station was named after Broad Street to prevent confusion with other stations. Between 1990 and 2015, Broad Street was only open on weekdays and weekday nights.

== History ==
=== Planning and construction ===
On March 19, 1913, the Brooklyn Rapid Transit Company (BRT; after 1923, the Brooklyn–Manhattan Transit Corporation or BMT) and the city signed Contract 4 of the Dual Contracts, which provided for the construction of certain lines, including the Nassau Street Line. In July 1915, the New York Public Service Commission received the rights to build subway entrances within five buildings near the intersection of Broad and Wall Streets, which would have served the proposed BRT station there. Among the buildings were the New York Stock Exchange Building, the Mills Building, and 23 Wall Street. Most of the BMT's Dual Contracts lines were completed by 1924, except for the Nassau Street Line. BMT chairman Gerhard Dahl was persistent at requesting that the city build the line, saying in 1923 that the BMT was willing to operate the line as soon as the city completed it. At the time, the BMT was planning to construct two stations on the Nassau Street Line, including one at the intersection of Wall and Broad Streets. However, mayor John Hylan refused to act during his final two years in office. BOT chairman John H. Delaney believed that the line was unnecessary because both of its planned stations would be extremely close to existing subway stations. Meanwhile, the BMT claimed that the city's failure to complete the line was overburdening other BMT lines. By January 1925, the BMT was asking its passengers to pressure Hylan into approving the remainder of the Nassau Street Line. Work did not commence until after James Walker succeeded Hylan as mayor at the end of 1925.

The city government agreed to build the Nassau Street Line in May 1927, after the BMT sued the city for $30 million. At the time, the city wanted to take over the BMT's lines but could not do so until all Dual Contracts lines were completed. The BOT received bids for the construction of the line that July, but it rejected every bid the next month because of concerns over the lowest bidder's ability to complete the work. That September, contractors again submitted bids to the BOT; some bidders offered to build the entire line, while others only offered to construct the segments of the line to the north or south of Liberty Street. The BOT awarded construction contracts for the line's construction two months later. The Marcus Contracting Company was hired to build the portion north of Liberty Street, including the Fulton Street station, for $4.7 million, while Moranti and Raymond were hired to build the portion to the south for $5.7 million. The New York City Board of Estimate approved the contracts in January 1928, allowing the builders to construct the line using the cut-and-cover method, despite merchants' requests that the line be constructed using tunneling shields.

The line was constructed 20 feet (6.1 m) below the active IRT Lexington Avenue Line, next to buildings along the narrow Nassau Street, and the project encountered difficulties such as quicksand. When the construction contracts were awarded, work had been projected to be completed in 39 months. Nassau Street is only 34 feet (10 m) wide, and the subway floor was only 20 feet (6.1 m) below building foundations. As a result, 89 buildings had to be underpinned to ensure that they would stay on their foundations. Construction had to be done 20 feet below the active IRT Lexington Avenue Line. An area filled with quicksand with water, which used to belong to a spring, was found between John Street and Broad Street. Additionally, the station underpinned the former Sub-Treasury building (now Federal Hall) at the northeast corner of Wall Street and Nassau Street; the city had to receive permission from the United States Congress to dig under the building, and it constructed a new foundation for that edifice. Construction was done at night so as to not disturb workers in the Financial District.

By early 1929, sixty percent of the work had been finished. The project was 80 percent complete by April 1930. Later that year, a federal judge ruled that the city government did not have to pay the BMT $30 million in damages for failing to construct the Nassau Street Line. The total construction cost was $10.072 million for 0.9 miles (1.4 km) of new tunnels, or $2,068 per foot ($6,780/m), which was three times the normal cost of construction at the time.

=== Operation ===
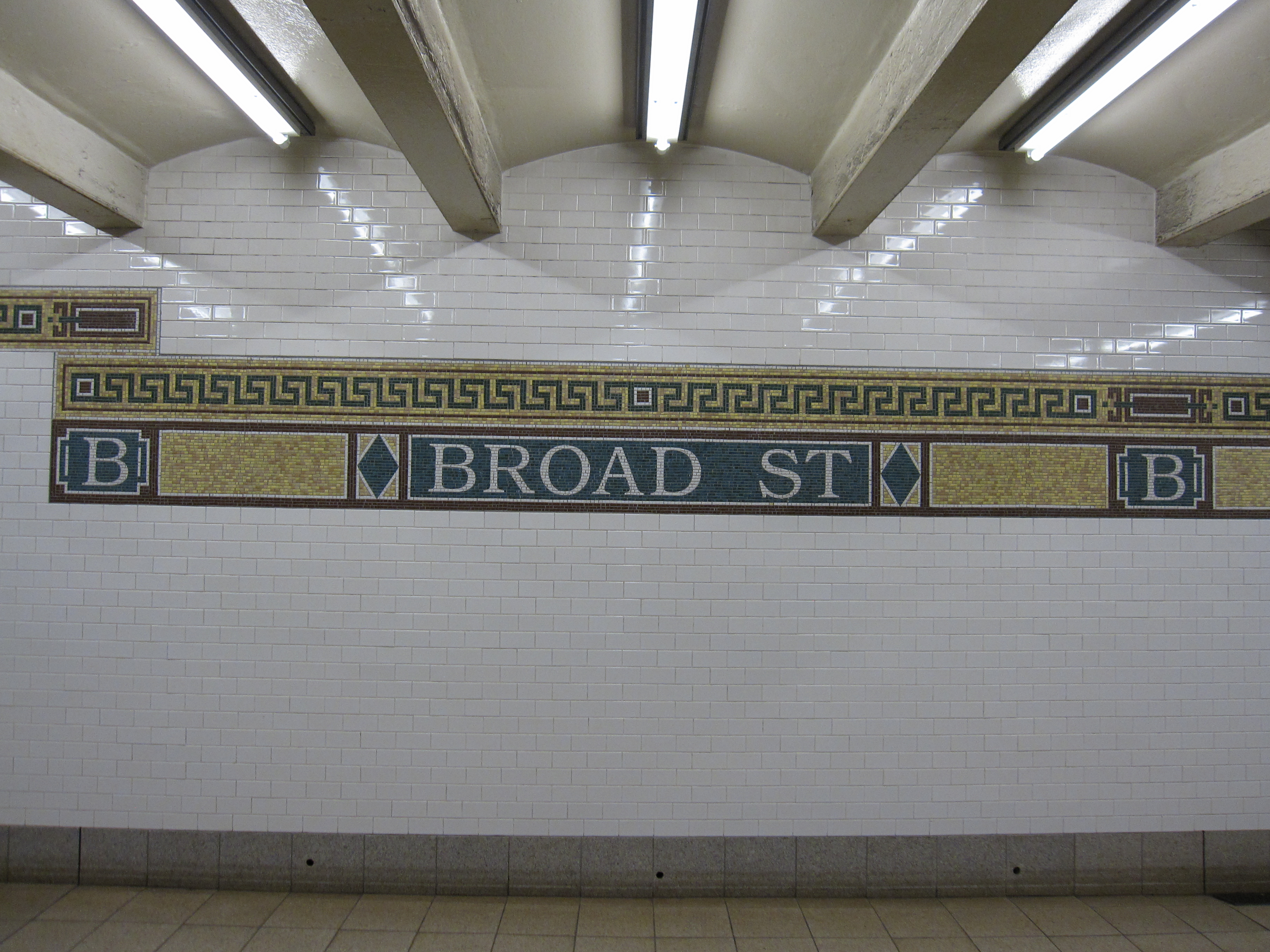
Grecian revival tablet and frieze circa 1996 from original Vickers design

The station opened on May 29, 1931, completing what was known as the "Nassau Street Loop". The loop ran from the line's previous terminus at Chambers Street, running through the Fulton Street and Broad Street stations before merging with the Montague Street Tunnel to Brooklyn. The completion of the line relieved congestion on several BMT lines to southern Brooklyn, which previously had to operate to Midtown Manhattan using the Broadway Line. When the line was completed, Culver Line trains began operating on the loop; previously, elevated Culver Line trains from Coney Island ran only as far as Ninth Avenue, where transfers were made to West End subway trains. The new line provided an additional ten percent capacity compared with existing service through DeKalb Avenue. Service on the Jamaica Line was extended to operate to this station.

The station is under Broad and Nassau Streets, with Wall Street as the cross-street, but was named after Broad Street to distinguish it from the two other Wall Street stations nearby, at Broadway and at William Street. When the station opened, it had 14 exits to nearby buildings. Banking firm J.P. Morgan & Co., which occupied a structure at 23 Wall Street (on the southwest corner with Broad and Nassau Streets), paid for the installation of bronze rails and stanchions on the subway entrance just outside its building. Other entrances were built to the basements of the Equitable Building and the Bankers Trust Company Building. In addition, there were street entrances outside the New York Stock Exchange Building; to the intersection of Broad Street and Exchange Place; and to the northwest corners of Nassau and Cedar Streets.

In April 1993, the New York State Legislature agreed to give the MTA $9.6 billion for capital improvements. Some of the funds would be used to renovate nearly one hundred New York City Subway stations, including Broad Street. From September 30, 1990, to June 14, 2015, the Broad and Fulton Street stations were closed during weekends, making them two of the only New York City Subway stations that lacked full-time service.

==== Proposed elevators ====
A proposed skyscraper at 45 Broad Street will provisionally include an entrance to the station that contains elevators, making the station compliant with the Americans with Disabilities Act of 1990. The plans call for two elevators, one for each platform, at the northeastern and southwestern corners of Broad Street and Exchange Place. The New York City Council approved the construction of the elevators in July 2018, and granted the developers an additional 71,391 square feet (6,632.4 m^{2}) in zoning rights in exchange for building the elevators.

Residents and tenants of 15 and 30 Broad Street opposed construction of glass-and-metal elevators, saying they posed a risk for terrorist attacks; the buildings' occupants hired a security consultant who determined they were a terrorist risk. However, the Metropolitan Transportation Authority hired its own security consultant who found they would not make the area more prone to terrorist attacks. Regular riders at the Broad Street station also advocated for the elevators because only seven of the 30 stations served by the J and Z trains were wheelchair-accessible as of 2025 (two of them each in Manhattan and Brooklyn and three more in Queens).

== Station layout ==
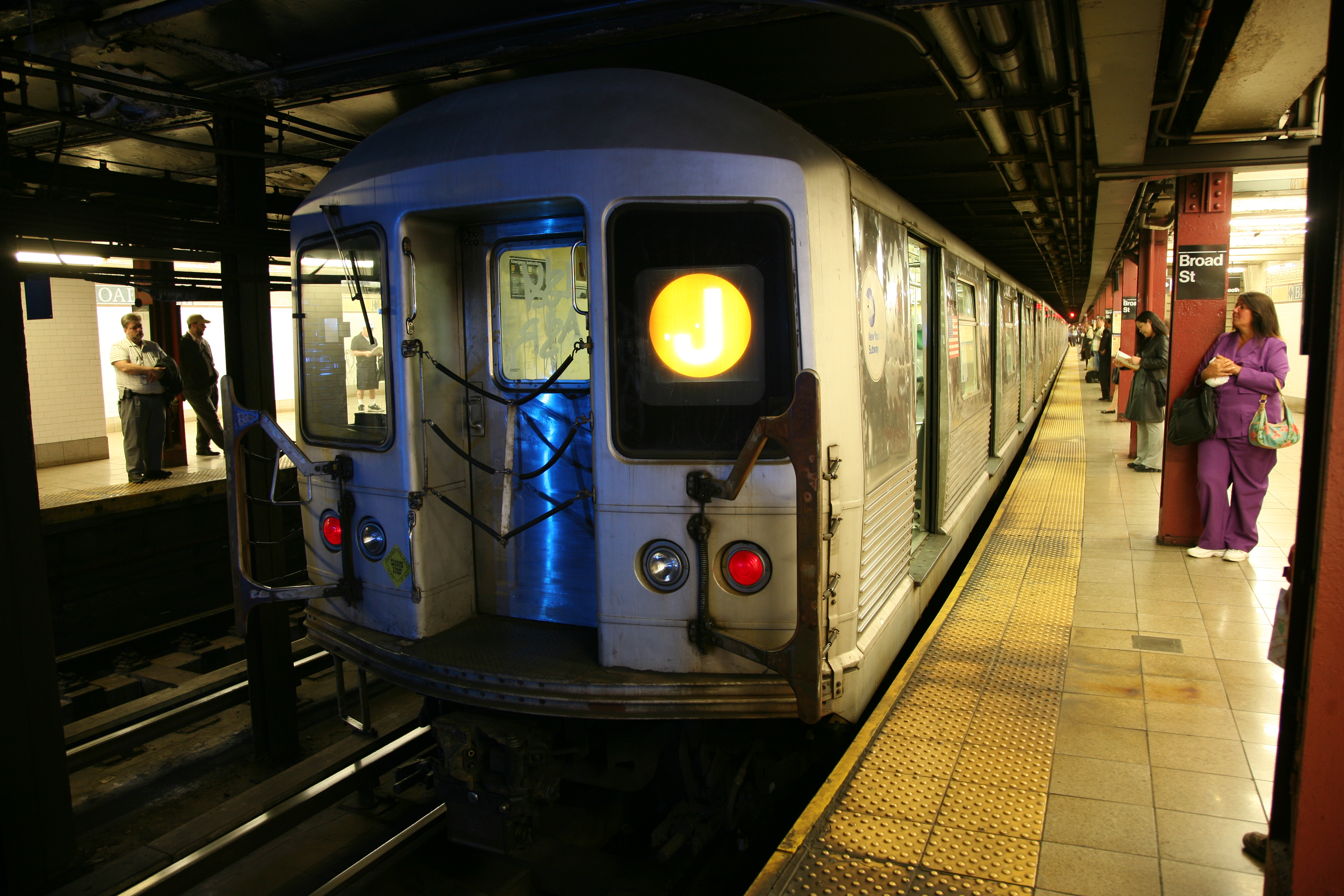
A consist of R42 cars in J service at Broad Street

This station has two tracks and two side platforms and is approximately 535 feet (163 m) long. The J train stops here at all times, while the Z train stops here during rush hours in the peak direction. The Broad Street station is the southern terminus of both routes; the next station to the north is Fulton Street. Fixed platform barriers, which are intended to prevent commuters falling to the tracks, are positioned near the platform edges. In contrast to the Fulton Street station, which is built on two levels because of the narrowness of Nassau Street, the Broad Street station is wide enough to accommodate both tracks on the same level. South of this station, there are two center stub tracks ending at bumper blocks used for laying-up and relaying trains. Trains terminate on the southbound track and continue to the center stub tracks, where they reverse direction. There is also a single switch north of the station to enable trains on the southbound track to return to the northbound track.

Further south, the two tracks of the BMT Nassau Street Line merge with the BMT Broadway Line via a flying junction as it enters the Montague Street Tunnel into Downtown Brooklyn. After the line merges with the Montague Street Tunnel, the next station to the south is Court Street. No regular service has used this connection since the M train was rerouted in June 2010.

The station originally had red tile bands, similar to those used on the Independent Subway System. This station was renovated in the late 1990s and a mosaic design was added to the platform walls. Beneath a small green and gold trim-line is a larger gold trim-line with a maroon border and white "B" and "BROAD ST" tablets on a blue-green background at regular intervals.

=== Exits ===
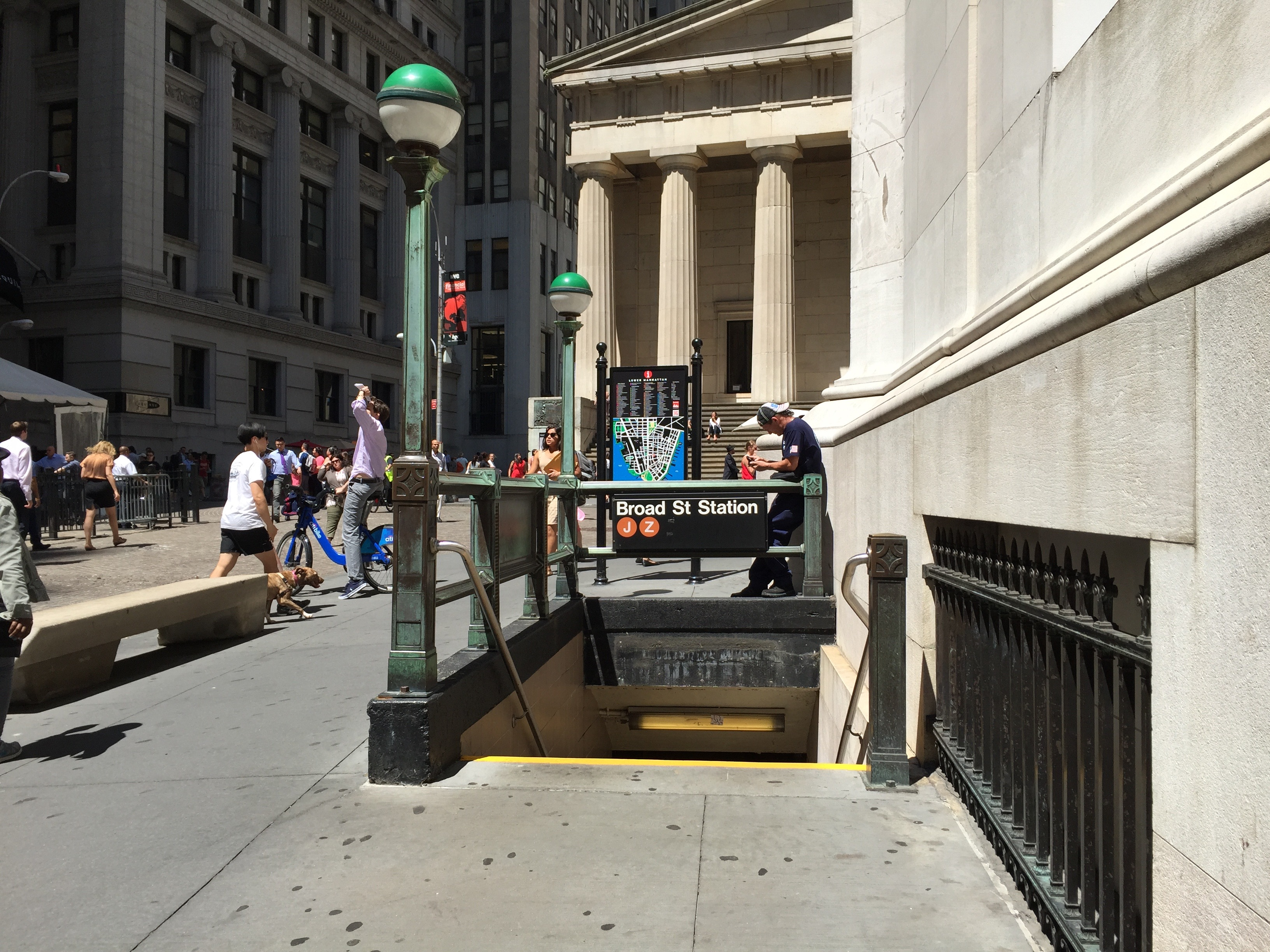
Entrance next to 23 Wall Street, following the restoration of full-time service to the station

This station has three entrance and exit areas, with eight total stairways. The full-time entrance/exit is at the north end above the platforms. Two staircases from each side go up to a mezzanine containing a turnstile bank and station agent's booth. Outside of fare control, two street stairs go up to the southeastern corner of Wall and Broad Streets (outside 23 Wall Street). Two more street stairs go up to the southwestern corner of the same intersection and lie outside of the New York Stock Exchange Building (NYSE). After the September 11 attacks in 2001, the stair facing away from Wall Street was closed off by the New York City Police Department, which had instituted a security zone around the NYSE. In 2012, the stair facing towards Wall Street was closed when the security zone was reorganized. In 2017, the two exits were proposed to be sealed as part of general improvements in that area, but no action was taken. In 2019, the MTA again proposed permanently closing and removing the stairways to allow the NYSE to improve the streetscape just outside the building.

The other two fare entrances/exits are unstaffed and at platform level. The northbound platform has a part-time bank of both regular and HEET turnstiles and three street stairs, one to the northeastern corner of Exchange Place and Broad Street (outside 15 Broad Street) and two along Broad Street between Exchange Place and Beaver Street (outside the Broad Exchange Building). The southbound platform has turnstiles that were originally HEET access, but were converted to exit-only following the elimination of through service at this station. Two staircases go to Broad Street between Exchange Place and Beaver Street, outside 30 Broad Street. A third on the southwestern corner of Exchange Place and Broad Street was closed and sealed. There is another exit-only staircase at the station leading to the northwestern corner of Broad Street and Exchange Place. It was previously closed by the New York City Police Department as well, but was reopened when security zone was reorganized.

Outside of fare control, the station's main entrance/exit has a long passage that is only open weekdays from 7:00 a.m. to 6:00 p.m. It runs north three blocks to the basement of 28 Liberty Street, where two sets of doors and a wide staircase lead to an unmarked entrance/exit at the east side of Nassau Street at Cedar Street. This entrance also provides access to the Wall Street/William Street station (2 and 3 trains) and the Wall Street/Broadway station (4 and 5 trains). The passage also has two closed exits; one led to the northwestern corner of Wall Street and Nassau Street and was closed by 1992. The other led to the northwestern corner of Cedar Street and Nassau Street, near 140 Broadway, but was closed by 1999 and has since been repurposed into an emergency exit. Halfway through the passage, a short staircase from the west side leads up to a narrower passageway that runs through the basement of the Equitable Building before two offset High Entrance/Exit Turnstiles provide entrance to the Wall Street/Broadway station. Inside fare control, the passage splits in half with each branch leading to either side platform of Wall Street. Free connections between the BMT Nassau Street Line and IRT Lexington Avenue Line are available at the next three stations north (Fulton Street, Chambers Street, and Canal Street).
