= Broad Street Subway =

Broad Street Subway can refer to the following:

- Newark Light Rail Broad Street Extension, in Newark, New Jersey, USA
- Broad Street Line, in Philadelphia, Pennsylvania, USA

The subway stations with the name "Broad Street" include:

- Broad Street station (BMT Nassau Street Line), in New York City, USA
- Newark Broad Street station, Newark, New Jersey, USA
