= Great New York City Fire of 1845 =

Fire and explosion in Manhattan

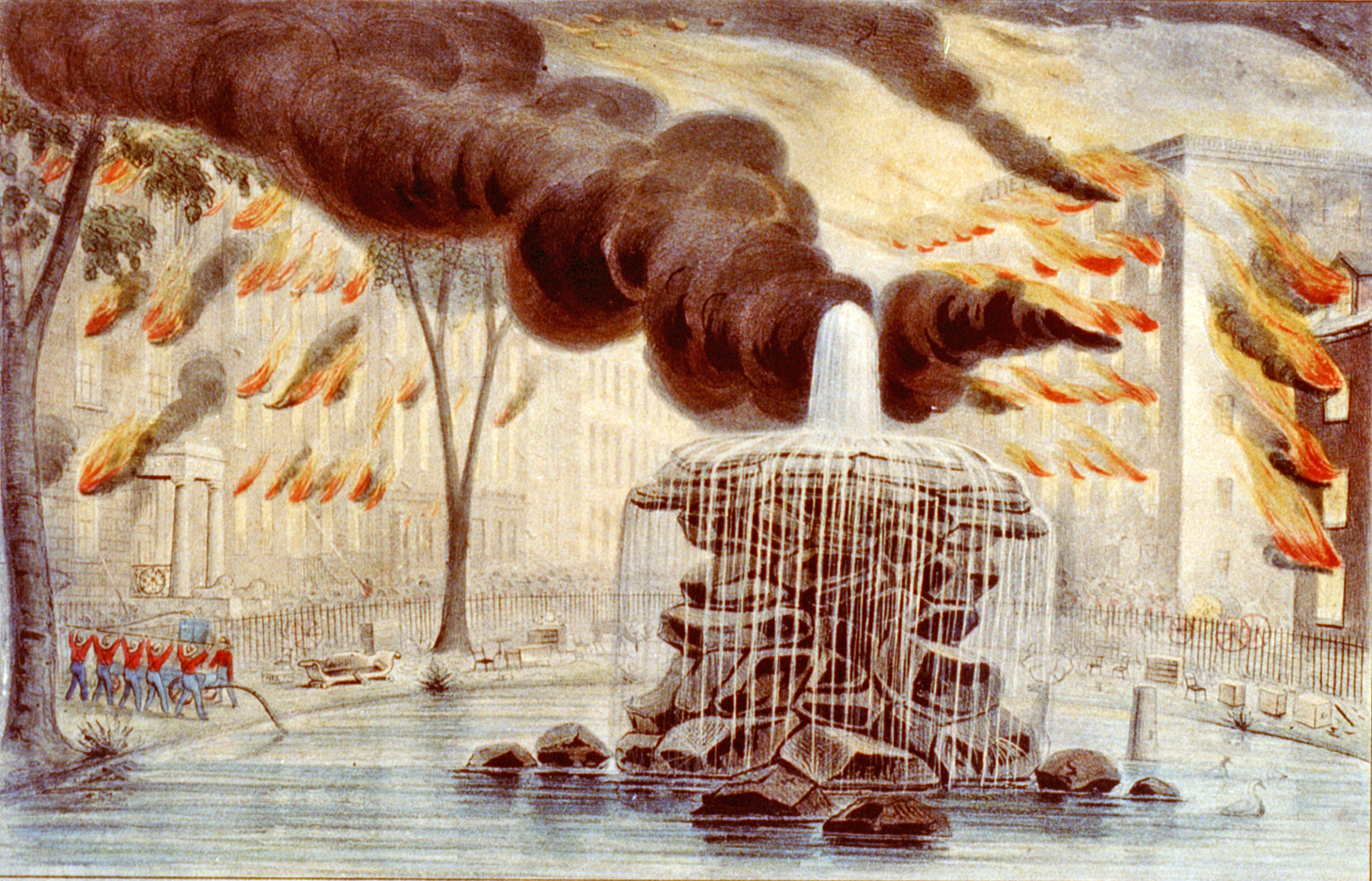
- Painting of the Great New York City Fire of 1845, seen from Bowling Green
- Date: July 19, 1845
- Location: Lower Manhattan, New York City; 40°42′22″N 74°0′43″W
- Outcome: 345 structures destroyed
- Deaths: 30

The Great New York City Fire of 1845 broke out on July 19, 1845, in Lower Manhattan, New York City. The fire started in a whale oil and candle manufacturing establishment and quickly spread to other wooden structures. It reached a warehouse at 38 Broad Street where combustible saltpeter was stored and caused a massive explosion that spread the fire even farther.

The fire destroyed 345 buildings in the southern part of what is now the Financial District, resulting in property damage estimated at the time between $5 million and $10 million (equivalent to between $173 million and $346 million in 2025). Four firefighters and 26 civilians died. The Great New York City Fire of 1845 was the last of three particularly devastating fires that affected the heart of Manhattan, the other two occurring in 1776 and 1835.

While very destructive, the 1845 fire confirmed the value of building codes restricting wood-frame construction, which had been implemented in 1815. Despite general improvements, the 1845 fire prompted public calls for a more proactive stance in fire prevention and firefighting, and the city established a reserve unit called the Exempt Fireman's Company.

== Origin ==
The fire started at about 2:30 a.m. on Saturday, July 19, 1845, on the third floor of J. L. Van Doren, Oil Merchant and Stearin Candle Manufacturer, known as a seller of whale oil, at 34 New Street in Manhattan, and spread quickly to adjoining buildings. The City Hall alarm bell began to ring at about 3:00 a.m., summoning firefighters.

Firefighters from the Fire Department of the City of New York (FDNY), at that time a volunteer organization, arrived under the command of Chief Engineer Cornelius Anderson. As the fire grew, the FDNY personnel were joined by retired fire chiefs from the city and crews from the Brooklyn, Newark, and Williamsburg fire departments. Firemen battling the blaze were aided by water flowing from the Croton Aqueduct, which had been completed in 1842. The fire either weakened in intensity or had been subdued by firefighters by 1:00 p.m. that day.

During the ten and a half hours that it burned, the fire had destroyed buildings from Broad Street below Wall Street to Stone Street, up Whitehall Street to Bowling Green, and up Broadway to Exchange Place. Thirty people in total were killed—including four firefighters and 26 civilians—and buildings were reported destroyed on Broadway, New Street, Broad Street, Exchange Place, Beaver Street, Marketfield Street, Whitehall Street, and South William Street. All told, the fire destroyed 345 buildings in the southern part of what is now the Financial District, resulting in property damage estimated at the time between $5 million and $10 million (equivalent to between $160 million and $319 million in 2024).

There were multiple reports of looting during the fire and in its aftermath, both of businesses and private residences. At least two elderly women reported being approached by young men who offered to help them move their belongings from their damaged buildings, only to have their valuables stolen.

== Warehouse explosion ==
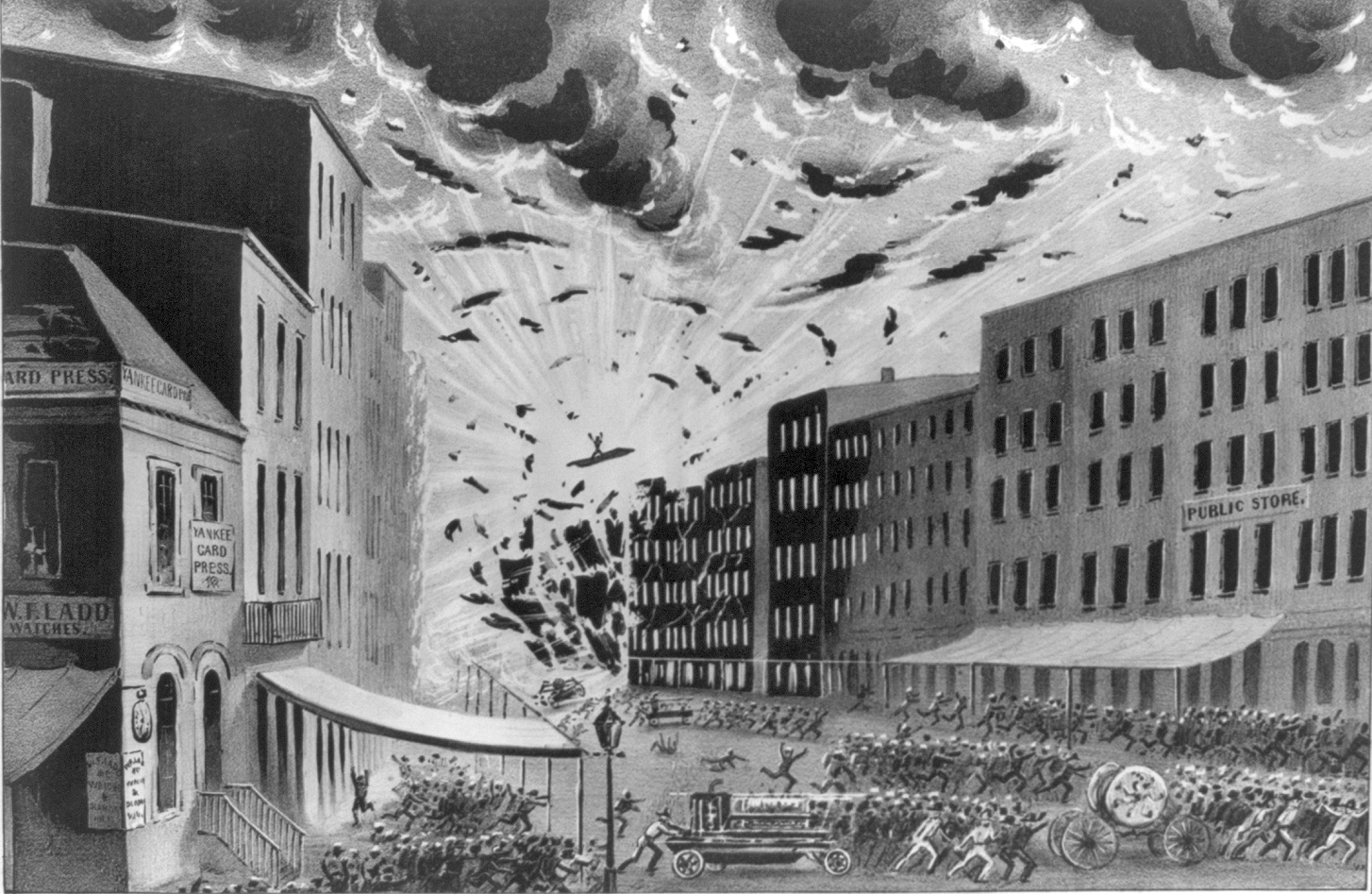
Explosion of a warehouse on Broad Street, July 19, 1845

In the fire's first two hours, it reached a large multi-story warehouse occupied by Crocker & Warren on Broad Street, where a large quantity of combustible saltpeter was stored.

When Engine Co. 22 arrived, it was ordered to pump water on the warehouse. The company's firefighters entered the warehouse and dragged a hose up a staircase to direct water onto the fourth floor. When heavy black smoke began coming down the stairway, Foreman Garrett B. Lane ordered his firemen to evacuate. Fireman Francis Hart Jr. became trapped while trying to collect the hose and was forced to flee to the roof and escape over neighboring rooftops.

At about 3:30 or 4:00 a.m., roughly five minutes after Engine Co. 22 evacuated, the building exploded. The explosion flattened six to eight buildings, blew in the fronts of the opposite houses on Broad Street, and wrenched shutters and doors from buildings at some distance from the immediate area. It propelled bricks and other missiles through the air, threw many people down who had gone as far as Beaver Street, and spread the fire far and wide so that the whole neighborhood was set ablaze. The explosion shattered windows a mile away and was heard as far away as Sandy Hook, New Jersey.

Engine Co. 22's vehicle was blown across Broad Street and eventually burned. Several members of the company were injured. Hart was thrown across a rooftop by the explosion but only sustained a minor ankle injury. Augustus L. Cowdrey of Engine Co. 42 and Dave Van Winkle of Engine Co. 5 were throwing water on an adjacent building when a second explosion occurred in the warehouse. The explosion threw Van Winkle into the street. Cowdrey was killed, his body never found. His company continued to search for him amid the rubble for two days. His name appears along with many others on a memorial in Trinity Churchyard in New York for volunteer firefighters who died in the line of duty.

The cause of the explosion was debated in the days immediately following the fire. Public speculation led to the arrest of Crocker and Warren, the occupants of the warehouse. The Daily Tribune reported that the explosions could not have occurred without the presence of gunpowder in addition to the saltpeter, and thus they were suspected of possessing gunpowder, which would have led to a murder charge. However, a later inquiry cleared Crocker and Warren of all charges, as no evidence of gunpowder was discovered.

There was some speculation that the explosion had been caused by the NY Gas Light Co.'s gasometer house, but Chief Engineer Cornelius Anderson released a statement the day of the fire stating that the explosion occurred before the flames ever reached the gas house.

== Aftermath ==
The Great New York City Fire of 1845 was the last of three particularly devastating fires that affected the heart of Manhattan, the other two occurring in 1776 and 1835. While very destructive, the 1845 fire confirmed the value of building codes restricting wood-frame construction. In 1815, city officials had banned the new construction of wood-frame structures in the densest areas of the city. The 1845 fire demonstrated the efficacy of these restrictions, as the progress of the fire was checked when it spread toward areas rebuilt after the 1835 fire with such materials as stone, masonry, and iron roofs and shutters. Despite general improvements, the 1845 fire prompted public calls for a more proactive stance in fire prevention and firefighting.

To strengthen the city's firefighting capabilities, the city established a reserve unit called the Exempt Fireman's Company, so called because it was made up of firemen who were exempt from militia and jury duty. The company was led by veteran fireman Zophar Mills, who had helped stop the 1835 fire from crossing Wall Street.
