= Garrat Noel =

18th century bookseller and educator

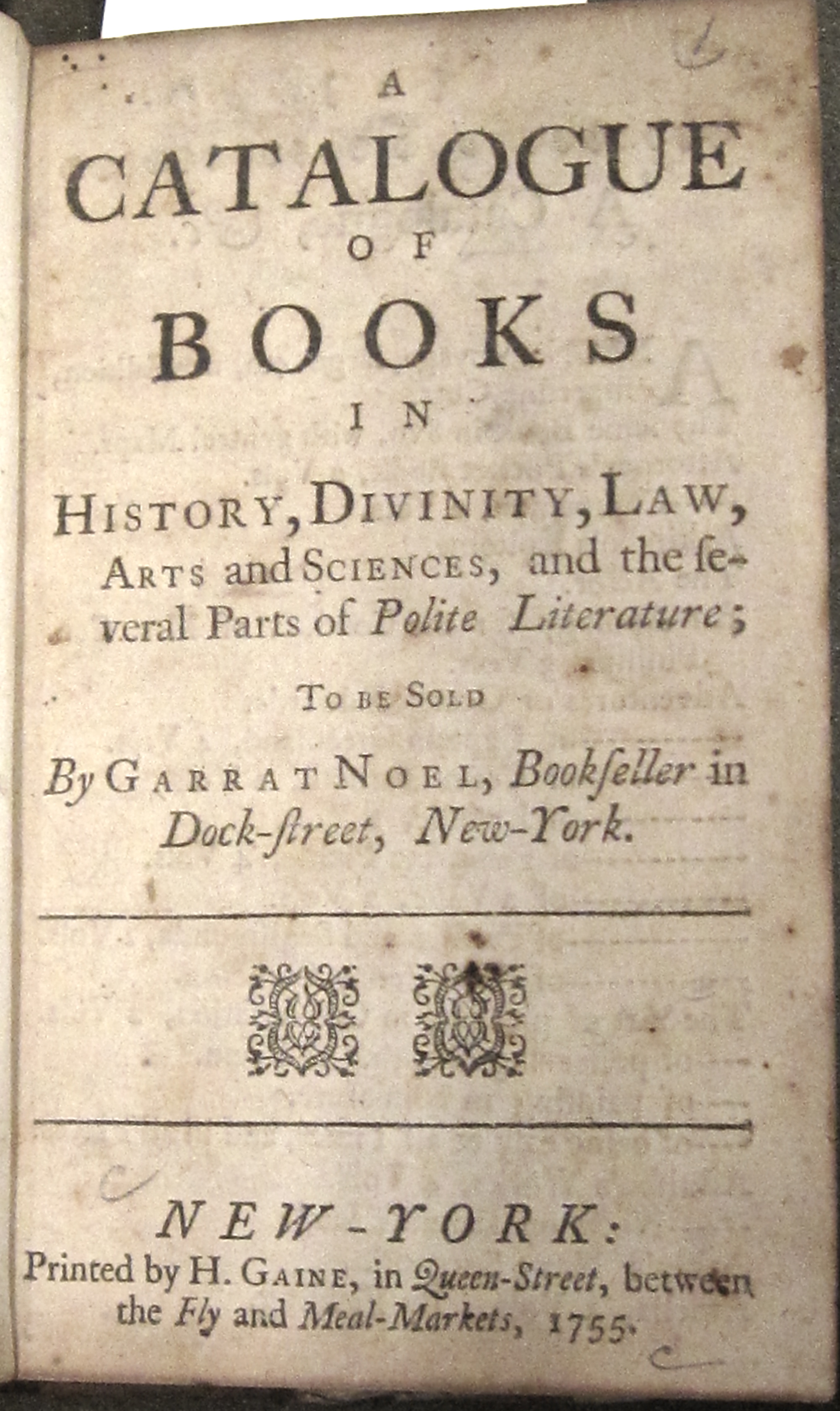
Noel's catalog, 1755 (Boston Public Library)

Garrat Noel (1706–1776) was a bookseller and educator in New York City, in the 18th century. He emigrated from Cádiz in 1750. In 1751 he worked as a "teacher of the Spanish tongue ... also ... reading, writing, arithmetick and merchants accompts." By 1752 he kept a shop on Broad Street, and in 1753 on Dock Street. From his shop Noel also operated a circulating library of "several thousand volumes of choice books, in history, divinity, travels, voyages, novels, &c."

In addition to books and periodicals Noel sold stationery and other sundries: "Playing cards by the dozen or single pack. Best ink powder and ink. Paper of all sorts, by the ream or quire, penknives, pencils, quils, pens, wax, and seals, ink-pots and pewter-stands, and boxes, paste-board files with laces, brass-wire files, blanks of all sorts, scales and dividers, and pocket compasses, pounce and pounce-boxes, memorandum books, fountain pens, ivory folders, leather paper cases, blank books for accounts of all sorts, alphabets, copy books, receipt books, 9 leaved carts of the Channel and West Indies. Likewise a fresh assortment of the famous tooth powder, Stoughton's Bitters, lotion water, smelling bottles, viper drops, Turlington and West's pectoral elixir, lavender drops, and lavender water."

In 1753 he carried in his shop "curious bustos, fit furniture for gentlmen's houses, in plaister of paris, plain, polished and burnished in gold, with black pedestals, all very fine drapery, viz. Shakespear and Milton, Homer and Virgil, Horace and Tully, Cicero and Plato, Caesar and Seneca, Prior and Congrave, Addison and Pope, Lock and Newton, Dryden and Gay, Venus and Apollo, Ovid and Julia. Likewise a parcel of pictures in the newest and genteelest taste."

Among the titles offered for sale by Noel in 1755:

- Behn's Plays
- Bowen's New Atlas
- Bysshe's Art of Poetry
- Francis Coventry's The History of a Lap Dog, Pompey the Little
- Echard's Gazetteer
- Fielding's Voyage to Lisbon
- The Gardner's Dictionary
- Harrison's House-keepers Pocket Companion
- Hartley's Observations on Man
- Edward Hatton's Mathematical Manual
- Eliza Haywood's Female Spectator
- Heylen's Help to English History
- Hibernicus's Letters
- The Hive: a Collection of Choice New Songs
- Hughes' Natural History of Barbados
- Hutcheson's Xenophon
- Independent Whig
- Alain-René Lesage's The Batchelor of Salamanca
- Noël-Antoine Pluche's History of the Heavens
- Potter's Antiquities of Greece
- The Tatler
- Wishart's Commentaries on the late War in Italy
- The World in Miniature
- The Young Lady Conducted

According to contemporary anecdotes, a customer once travelled to Noel's bookshop from "some distance up Hudson River" especially to purchase "Spanish bulls" advertised by Noel in the newspapers. The "old Scotchman" mistook the documents "for cattle."

Noel died in 1776 in Elizabethtown, New Jersey.

== See also ==
- Books in the United States
