= Mills Building (New York City) =

Former building in Manhattan, New York

Coordinates: 40.7064°N 74.011°W

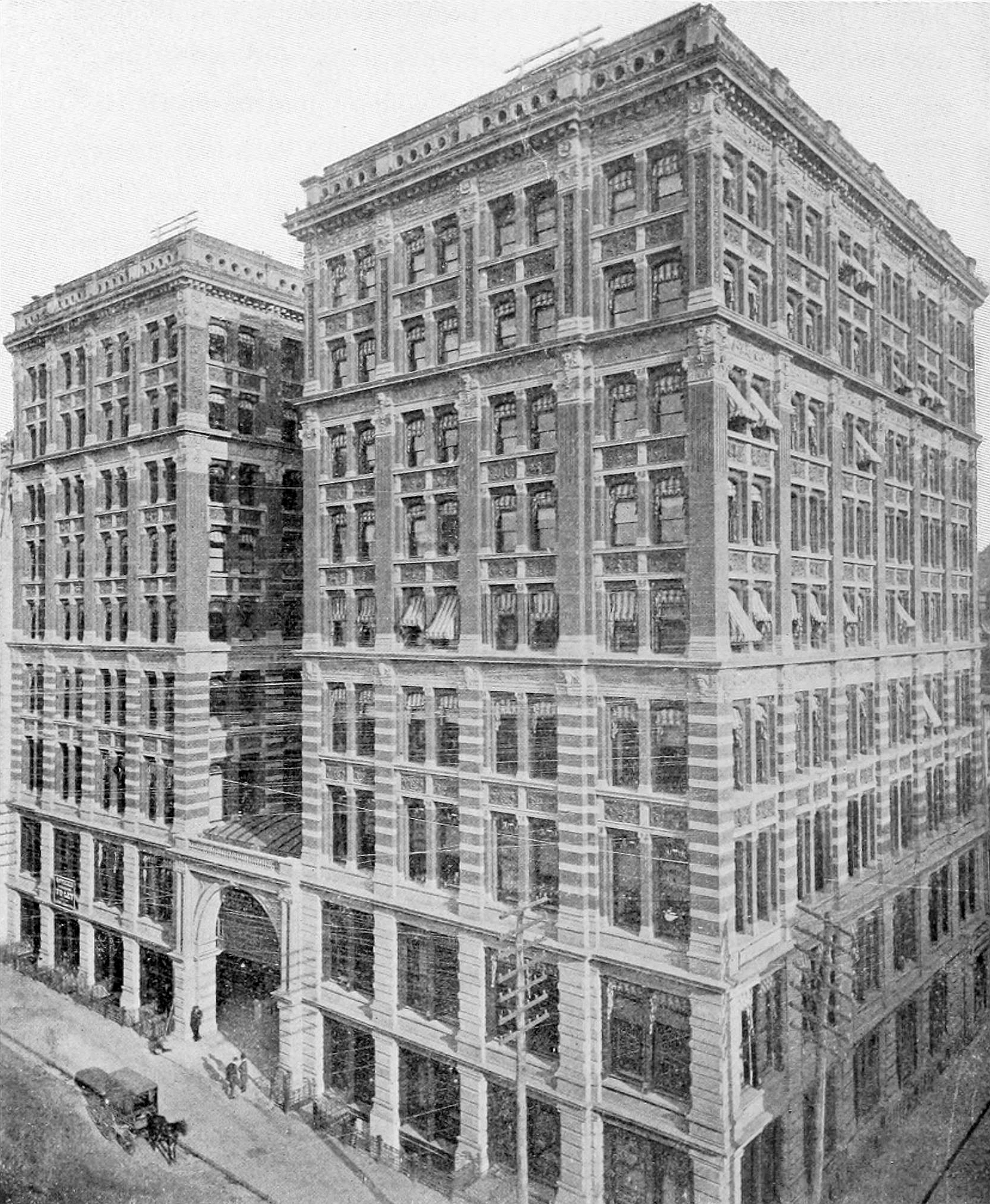
- Mills Building on Broad Street, New York (1882)
- Interactive map of the Mills Building area

General information
- Architectural style: Renaissance Revival architecture
- Location: Manhattan, New York City
- Opened: 1882
- Demolished: 1926

Design and construction
- Architect: George B. Post
- Main contractor: David H. King, Jr.

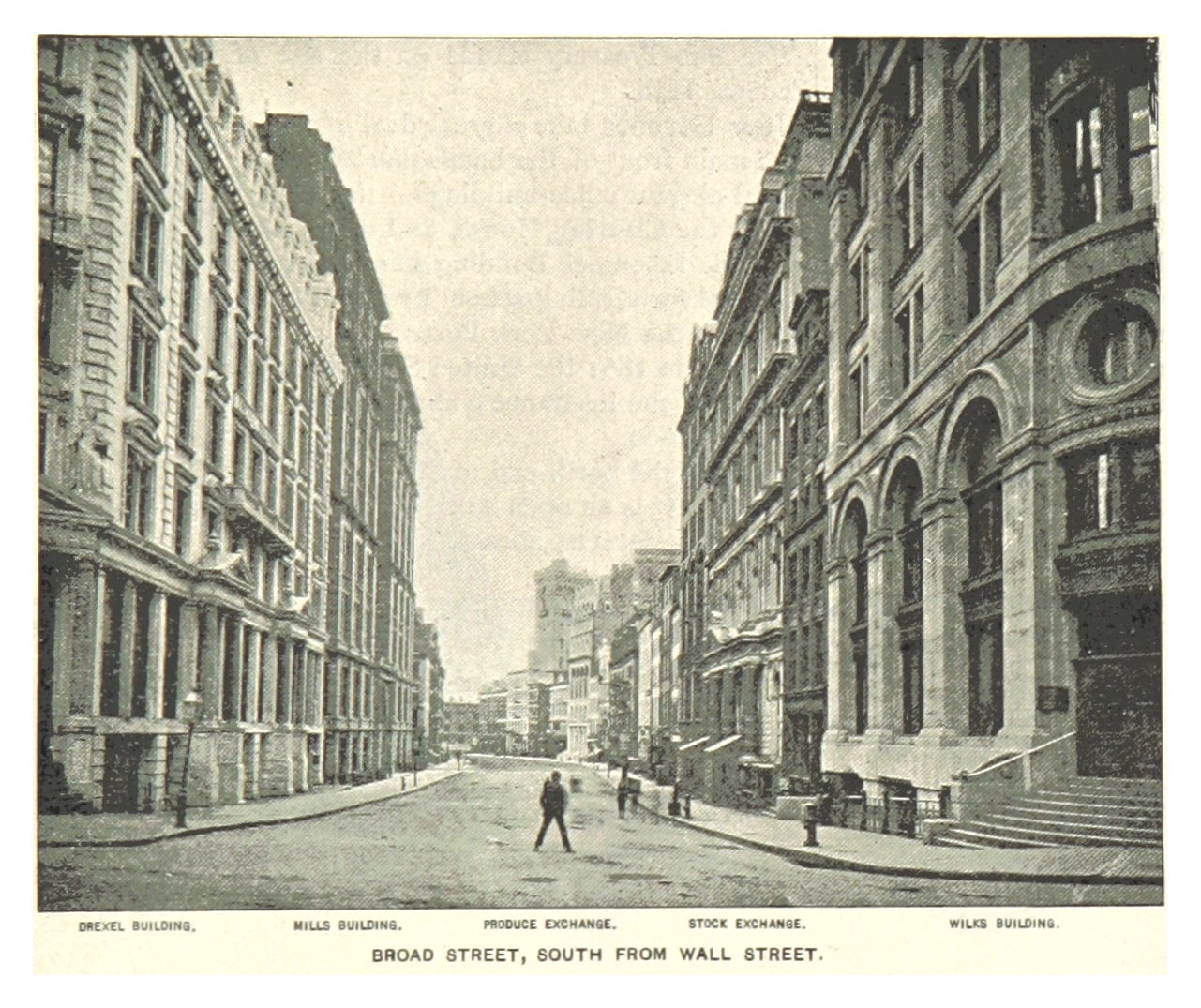
Broad Street in 1893. Mills Bldg is second on left

The Mills Building was a 10-story structure that stood at 15 Broad Street and Exchange Place in Manhattan, with an L-shaped extension to 35 Wall Street. It wrapped around the J. P. Morgan & Company Building at 23 Wall Street, on the corner of Broad and Wall Streets. George B. Post was the architect of the edifice.

D.O. Mills, a San Francisco, California banker, owned the property. Mills built a palatial home in New York City, while maintaining a villa in Millbrae, California.

== Construction ==
The Mills Building was completed in 1882. Wooden piles were driven down to support the edifice until it was found that it was too heavy for its foundation work. It rested on sandy soil, and the structure began to settle. Additional supports were driven down after a means of doing this was discovered. This was performed without the building having to be torn down. Finally a secure foundation was accomplished, although it was different from one composed of bedrock. In the future, this would be achieved by employing caisson foundations.

In 1908, there were plans to replace the Mills Building with a 1,000-foot-tall (300 m) skyscraper, which would be the world's tallest building.

== J.P. Morgan & Company lease ==
Beginning in 1920, the Mills Building was leased for 84 years for $27.3 million to J.P. Morgan & Company. The rent on the structure was fixed at $300,000 for the first 42 years, to increase $350,000 in 1962. The lease specified that a building of at least 25 stories had to be erected on the site of the Mills Building by May 1, 1928. The banking business had plans drawn by Trowbridge & Livingston for a 33-story edifice that would have cost $8 million to build.

In January 1925, the Mills Building lease was acquired by Equitable Trust. The firm built the 43-story 15 Broad Street on the site between 1926 and 1928.
