= Shaya Boymelgreen =

American real estate developer

- Born: JeShayahu Boymelgreen; 1951 (age 74–75); Israel
- Citizenship: Israel; United States
- Occupation: real estate developer
- Spouse: Sarah Boymelgreen
- Children: 8
- Website: http://www.boymelgreen.com/

Shaya Boymelgreen (born 1951) is an American real estate developer in New York City.

== Personal life ==
Born in Israel, Boymelgreen immigrated to New York in 1969 and worked in asbestos abatement and running a number of modern Judaica bookstores in Brooklyn, NY. In 1994, Shaya Boymelgreen began developing real estate with several small developments in Manhattan, under Boymelgreen Developers. In just over a decade, Boymelgreen transformed his family business into one of the largest and most active development companies in New York City. The company had more than 200 employees and an $8-billion portfolio that extended into major markets across the U.S. – including New York, Miami and Las Vegas. In the United States, Boymelgreen has developed more than 20,000 residential units. Boymelgreen’s company remains a family-owned and operated company. Boymelgreen identifies with the Chabad Lubavitch Hasidic Jewish community.

== Leviev Boymelgreen ==
In 2002, Boymelgreen entered a joint venture with Africa Israel Investments and the Leviev Global Group and formed Leviev Boymelgreen. Through the joint venture, Boymelgreen harnessed Leviev Boymelgreen’s collective financial strength, its global reach and real estate expertise to build a portfolio of residential, commercial and retail properties, with more than 40 projects completed.

Downtown by Philippe Starck is a 42-story tower and former headquarters of JP Morgan on Wall Street in New York City.

The Leviev Boymelgreen partnership was dissolved in 2007.

== LibertyPointe Bank ==
Boymelgreen opened LibertyPointe Bank in 2005, a new commercial bank. Within a few years Boymelgreen had opened several branches in Manhattan and Brooklyn.

Boymelgreen created Boymelgreen Capital in early 2006 focusing on buying, developing and managing real estate in Israel and around the world, either directly or through the acquisition of other entities.

== Azorim investment ==
Boymelgreen purchased a 64% stake in Azorim in September, 2006, a $500-million, publicly traded investment and development firm in Israel, with 120 employees and $730 million in assets. Azorim is one of Israel’s largest residential developers and a leader in construction and the marketing of residential developments and income generating assets.

Boymelgreen decided to concentrate his efforts outside of the United States where he expected higher returns. He identified Eastern Europe as an emerging market with residential and commercial development potential. Boymelgreen and Azorim acquired the controlling stake in Engel Group, (through its holding company Lagna Holdings), an Israeli-based international real estate company which specialized in development in Eastern Europe, Canada and Israel. Engel East Europe traded on the AIM in London and Engel Europe was traded in Israel.

Engel Group having activity in nine countries, including six shopping centers, 15,000 residential units developed, and projected sales of approximately $2 billion was considered one of the largest international developers in Eastern Europe. The acquisition would enable Boymelgreen and Azorim to utilize this infrastructure to establish large scale operations rapidly and eventually expand into other countries in the region.

Azorim expanded its investments in emerging international markets. India is one such market, where Mr. Boymelgreen saw investment opportunities based on the country’s current and projected growth. Azorim undertook two large scale residential developments in India, collaborating with local development partners. The company also pursued other investments in this market, exploring residential, commercial and retail development.

== 2008 financial crisis ==
During the 2008 financial crisis, Boymelgreen and the Engel group were at their peak of development throughout Europe. They were hit particularly hard as several projects in Warsaw, Poland and Kyiv, Ukraine were in the middle stages of construction. In 2011, Boymelgreen was also forced to sell his stakes in Azorim.

Simultaneously, in the United States the Federal Deposit Insurance Corporation (FDIC) altered its regulations and began requiring banks to have higher amounts of capital. Being unable to raise the capital needed, LibertyPointe Bank was handed to the FDIC, which was acquired by Valley National Bank. Meanwhile, numerous lawsuits were filed against Boymelgreen.
