= Lee, Higginson & Company Bank Building =

Commercial building in Manhattan, New York

- U.S. National Register of Historic Places
- U.S. Historic district – Contributing property
- New York State Register of Historic Places
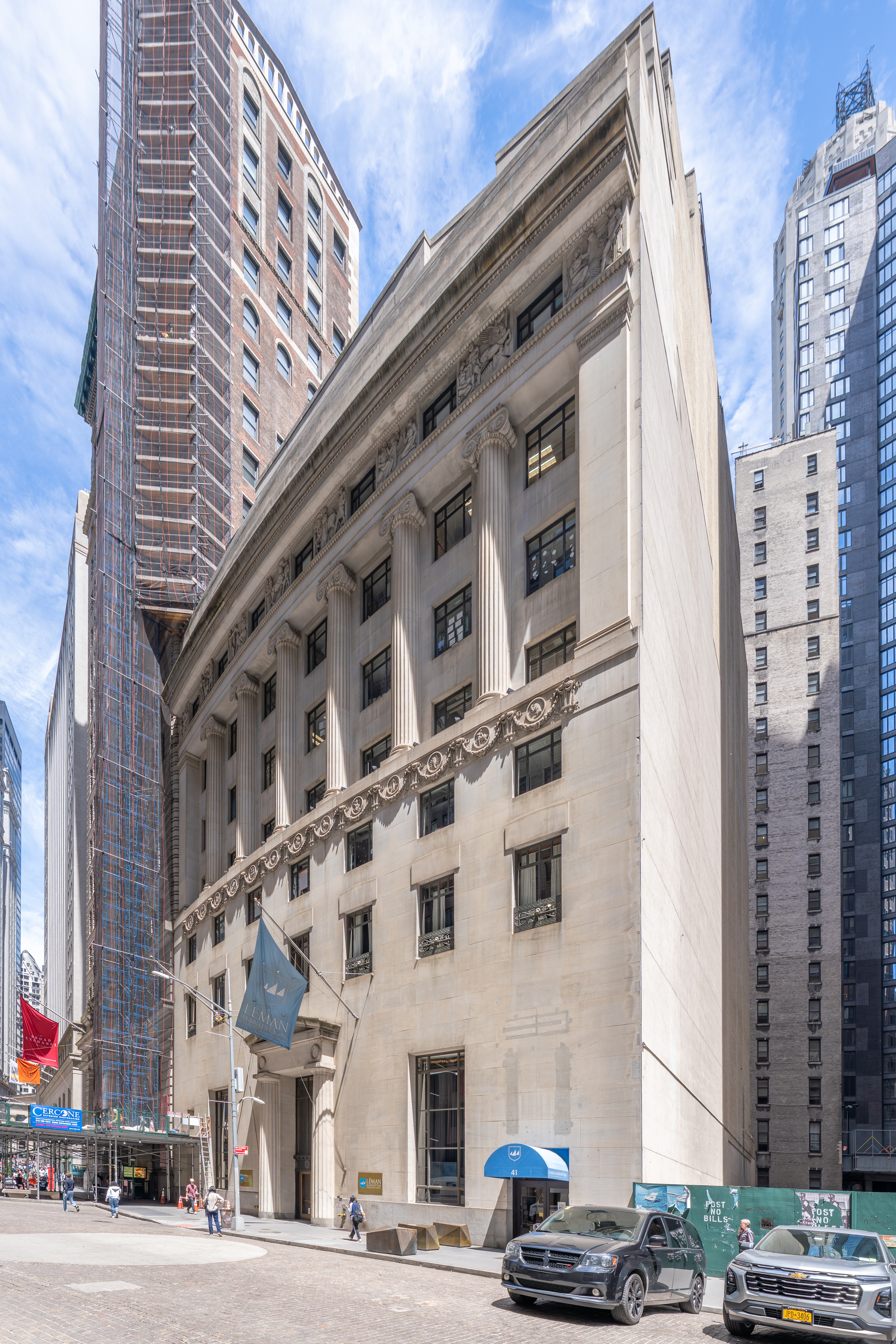
- (2026)
- Location: 41 Broad Street, New York, New York
- Coordinates: 40°42′20″N 74°00′41″W
- Area: less than one acre
- Built: 1928-1929
- Architect: Cross & Cross; Coale, Griffith B.; Friedlander, Leo, et al.
- Architectural style: Classical Revival
- Part of: Wall Street Historic District (ID07000063)
- NRHP reference No.: 06000476
- NYSRHP No.: 06101.008195

Significant dates
- Added to NRHP: June 7, 2006
- Designated CP: February 20, 2007
- Designated NYSRHP: April 20, 2006

The Lee, Higginson & Company Bank Building is a historic bank building located at 41 Broad Street in the Financial District of Lower Manhattan, New York City. The structure was designed by architects Cross & Cross and built in 1928–1929. It is a 10-story, Classical Revival style, with a top floor penthouse. It features a slightly curved front facade, architectural sculpture by Leo Friedlander, and murals by Griffith B. Coale.

It was added to the National Register of Historic Places on June 7, 2006. In 2007, it was designated as a contributing property to the Wall Street Historic District, a NRHP district.

== See also ==
- National Register of Historic Places listings in Manhattan below 14th Street
