= 45 Broad Street =

Planned residential building in Manhattan, New York

- Interactive map of the 45 Broad Street area

General information
- Status: On hold
- Type: Residential
- Location: Manhattan, New York
- Coordinates: 40°42′20″N 74°00′41″W
- Construction started: 2017
- Construction stopped: 2020
- Estimated completion: 2030

Technical details
- Floor count: 52
- Floor area: 221,000 ft^{2} (20,532 m^{2})

Design and construction
- Architect: Handel Architects

45 Broad Street is a residential building being constructed in the Financial District of Manhattan in New York City. The building was originally planned as Lower Manhattan's tallest residential tower. Excavation started in 2017, but as of 2020, construction is on hold. New signage at the site indicates that construction will resume shortly with Suffolk Construction as the prime contractor and the project is expected to be completed in Summer 2030.

== History ==
=== Site ===
Swig Equities acquired the 45 Broad Street site, as well as the adjacent Broad Exchange Building, in 2006. Swig planned to demolish a preexisting building at 45 Broad Street and part of the Broad Exchange Building to transfer air rights for a proposed development. Swig wished to build a Nobu Hotel for the site, which was backed by Robert De Niro. The building would have been designed by Moed de Armas and Shannon with a conventional glass curtain wall along with interiors by David Rockwell. The building would have contained a 13,000 square feet (1,200 m^{2}) retail base, 128 hotel rooms, and 77 "super-luxury" condominiums above the hotel on floors 41 through 62. The planned Nobu Hotel would have been 62 stories and 709 feet (216 m) in height and was planned for completion in 2010.

In January 2009, Swig defaulted on a $49.2 million mortgage from Lehman Brothers, leading to foreclosure on the property. In March 2012, Lehman took control of the property for $76.79 million.

In 2014, the parcel was placed on the market, and Madison Equities finalized their acquisition of the land in October of that year. AMS Acquisitions is also an investor in the project, and the building will be constructed by firm Pizzarotti-IBC.

=== Construction ===
Real estate site 6sqft released early renderings of the new plans for the site in January 2016. After the release of the renderings, Pizzarotti-IBC Rance MacFarland confirmed that the new structure would be a supertall, residential skyscraper catering to "entry- and mid-level buyers". More developed renderings were published by The Real Deal in February 2016. The building was originally designed by CetraRuddy. The building was to be mixed-use with 245 residences and a five-story retail base with 62,000 square feet (5,800 m^{2}) dedicated to commercial-retail use and 93,900 square feet (8,720 m^{2}) dedicated to a school. Amenities in the building were to include a fitness center with a pool, an outdoor garden, and several lounges. Windbreak levels were to puncture the facade on the 27th and 43rd floors, which would have 32-foot tall ceilings and terrace space.

Members of the New York real estate industry have expressed doubts that Madison will recoup costs, and the company has faced difficulty receiving funding for the project. These difficulties are in part due to the site's proximity to the New York Stock Exchange Building and the high-level security around that structure. However, the anticipated pricing of units in the building at just under $1 million up to $4 million has attracted additional investors including Gemdale (one of China's largest developers) given the softening super-luxury market. Construction work on the foundation began in April 2017, at which time the building's height was set at 1,115 feet (340 m), and excavation began in May 2018. The building was approved for construction in December 2019. However, construction was placed on hold in January 2020.

In March 2023, the project restarted under new developers, Madison Equities and Gemdale Properties, who hired Handel Architects to design a shorter, 52-story structure.

== Architecture ==
Handel Architects' plans called for a 52-story structure with 221,000 square feet (20,500 m^{2}) of space and 302 stories. Renderings of the revised plans indicate that the tower will have a metal-and-glass facade above a five-story base. The second story would contain a loggia, while the fifth-story setback would include an outdoor terrace.

=== Subway elevators ===
In July 2016, it was announced that the New York City Landmarks Preservation Commission had approved the construction of two new subway elevators outside the entrance to the building, available for public use. They will connect to the existing Broad Street station of the New York City Subway's J and Z trains. The design of the elevators is being overseen by Urbahn Architects. The plans call for two elevators, one for each platform, at the northeastern and southwestern corners of Broad Street and Exchange Place. The New York City Council approved the construction of the elevators in July 2018, and granted the developers 71,391 additional square feet in zoning rights in exchange for building the elevators. However, residents and tenants of 15 and 30 Broad Street opposed construction of glass-and-metal elevators, citing they posed a risk for terrorist attacks.
