= Continental Bank Building =

Office skyscraper in Manhattan, New York

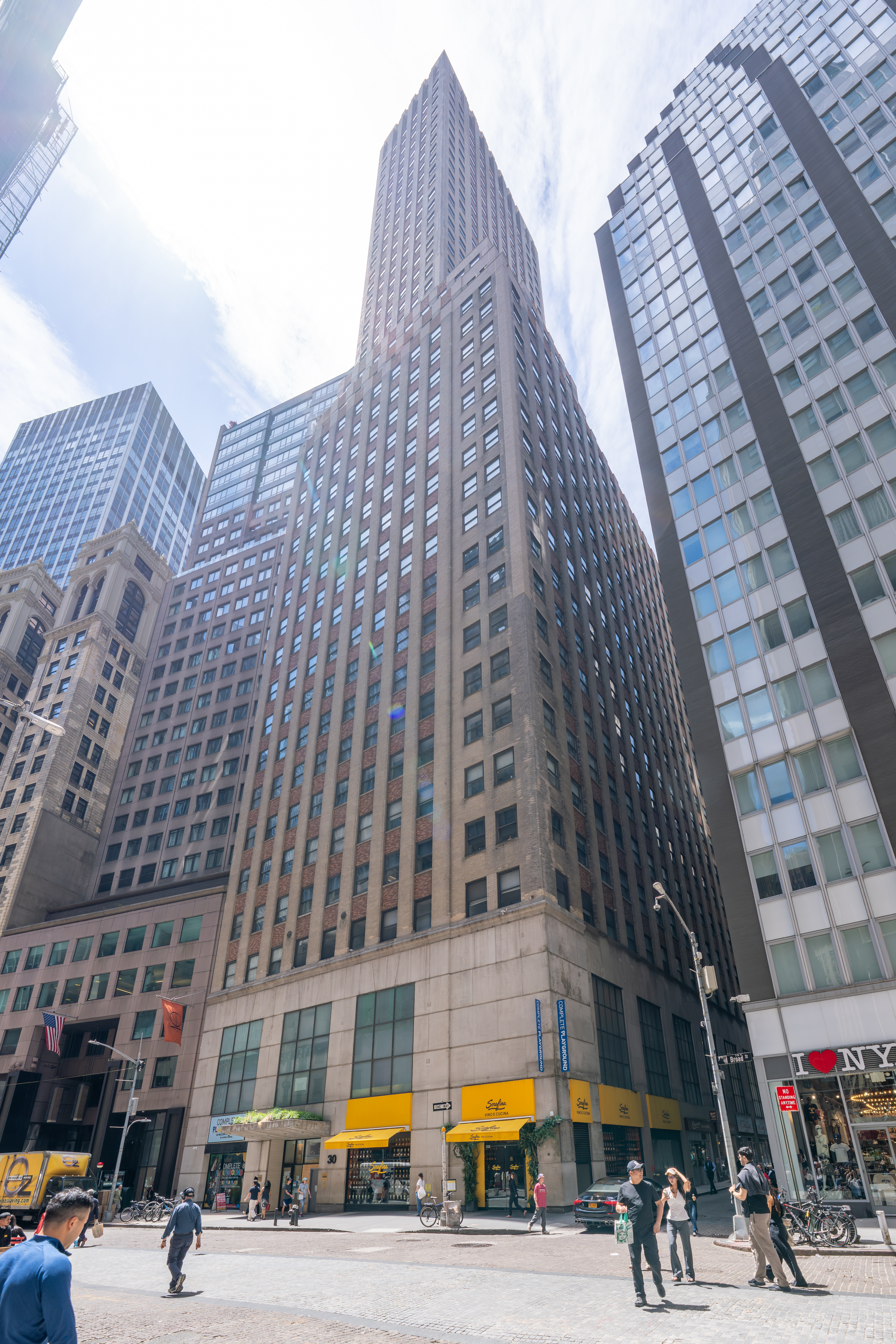
- Interactive map of the Continental Bank Building area

General information
- Type: Banking, Brokering
- Architectural style: art deco
- Location: 30 Broad Street, New York, New York, United States
- Coordinates: 40°42′21.99″N 74°0′41.56″W
- Construction started: 1931
- Opened: August 27, 1932
- Cost: $20 million

Height
- Height: 564 feet (172 m)

Technical details
- Floor count: 48
- Floor area: 300,000 square feet (28,000 m^{2})

Design and construction
- Architects: Morris, O’Connor; Cross and Cross

The Continental Bank Building is a 50-story Art Deco skyscraper at 30 Broad Street in the Financial District of Manhattan, New York City. It is next to the New York Stock Exchange Building.

== History ==
=== Origins ===
In 1929, a new 50-story building was announced at 30 Broad Street (location of the former 15-story Johnston Building) to house the Continental Bank and Trust Company and various brokers. The site extends along Broad Street at 87 feet 7 inches (26.70 m), the length of Exchange Place runs 149 feet 8.5 inches (45.631 m) from New Street, and runs 88 feet (27 m) along New Street. The building site was once owned by the Dutch Reformed Church which had erected the city's second almshouse on the site before 1659.

=== Architecture and construction ===
The estimated cost of the new building was $20 million. The project was the largest single cooperative building venture undertaken to that time. Cross and Cross were announced as the building's planners. An "unusual" feature of the building was a sub-basement clearing house where owner-tenants each have floor space and can transact business with other owner-tenants in the building by a system of pneumatic tubes to exchange receipts. Architects Morris and O’Connor completed drawings for the building in 1931.

The demolition of the Johnston building was planned from May 5 to July 13. The 15-story structure had exterior masonry that bore walls composed of granite (some pieces weighing as much as 10 tons) that were up to three feet thick at the lower walls. The exterior was ashlar granite while the interior was common brick backup laid in cement mortar. Its steel internal skeleton was only designed to carry the floor loads, because the exterior was self-supporting.

=== Opening and owners ===
The building opened for occupancy on April 27, 1932. The commercial real estate services company Cushman & Wakefield established a branch office here in 1932. The City Investing Company bought the building in 1943.

== Architecture ==
The building was designed as a skyscraper rising 48 stories, 564 feet (172 m) above street level with a "simple" architecture. According to the architects, the structure is designed to express straightforward business of the highest class without excessive ornamentation. The first three stories of the façade are clad in limestone with the remainder made up of light-colored brick and dark brick at the spandrels. The building footprint rises from street level to the 20th floor, where the first setback is made; another setback exists at the 23rd floor. The building tower then rises from the 24th to 48th floors. The top of the building is flat (having no ornament).

The building's lobby runs through from Broad Street to New Street with two elevator banks which serve the building, one set from the lobby to the 20th floor and the other from the lobby to floors 21 through 47. The 48th floor is accessed by stairs from floor 47. Total rentable space is announced as 300,000 square feet (28,000 m^{2}).

The building columns sit on new footings which rest upon rocks. The average depth of the new foundations is 46 feet (14 m) below Broad Street. However, the Broad Street side of the building rests on existing caissons. An adjoining structure along the southern property line required triple cantilever plate girders to provide headroom for the elevator doors. There are three floors below ground. The total building weight is estimated at 55,000 tons (7,000 tons of steel).

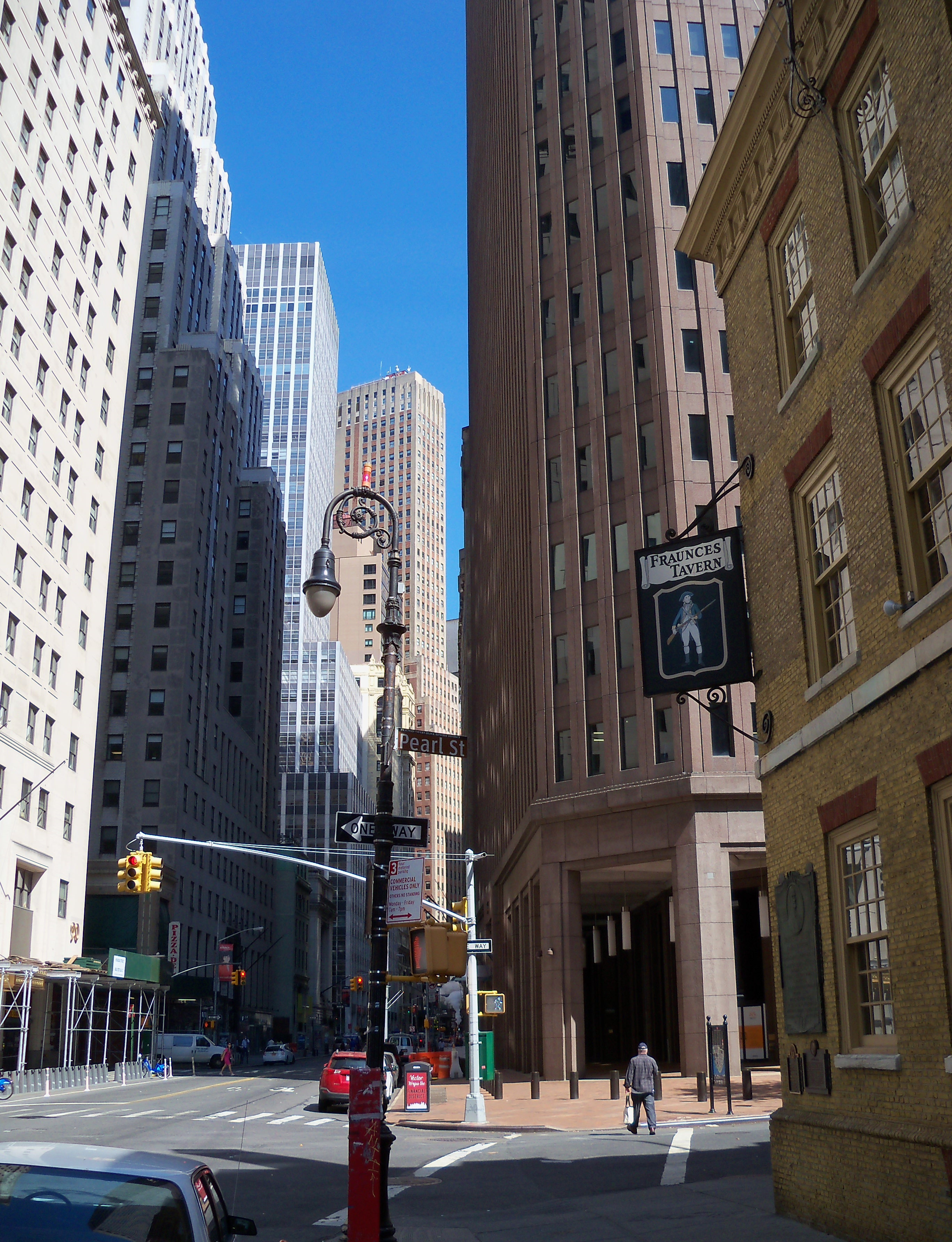
30 Broad Street in the center of the picture behind the streetlamp

== In popular culture ==
30 Broad Street appears as the "Larrabee Building" in the original 1954 version of the movie Sabrina, as the headquarters of the family business empire. Its address is prominent in a scene late in the movie with Audrey Hepburn standing on the sidewalk outside its entrance. The building and Broad Street are also seen in an early scene when William Holden parks his car out front.

The building is also used as a location in the opening scene of the 1954 film Executive Suite, also starring William Holden. A businessman walks out of the building, hails a taxi, then drops dead on the sidewalk, setting the movie's plot into motion.
