= 15 Broad Street =

Skyscraper in Manhattan, New York

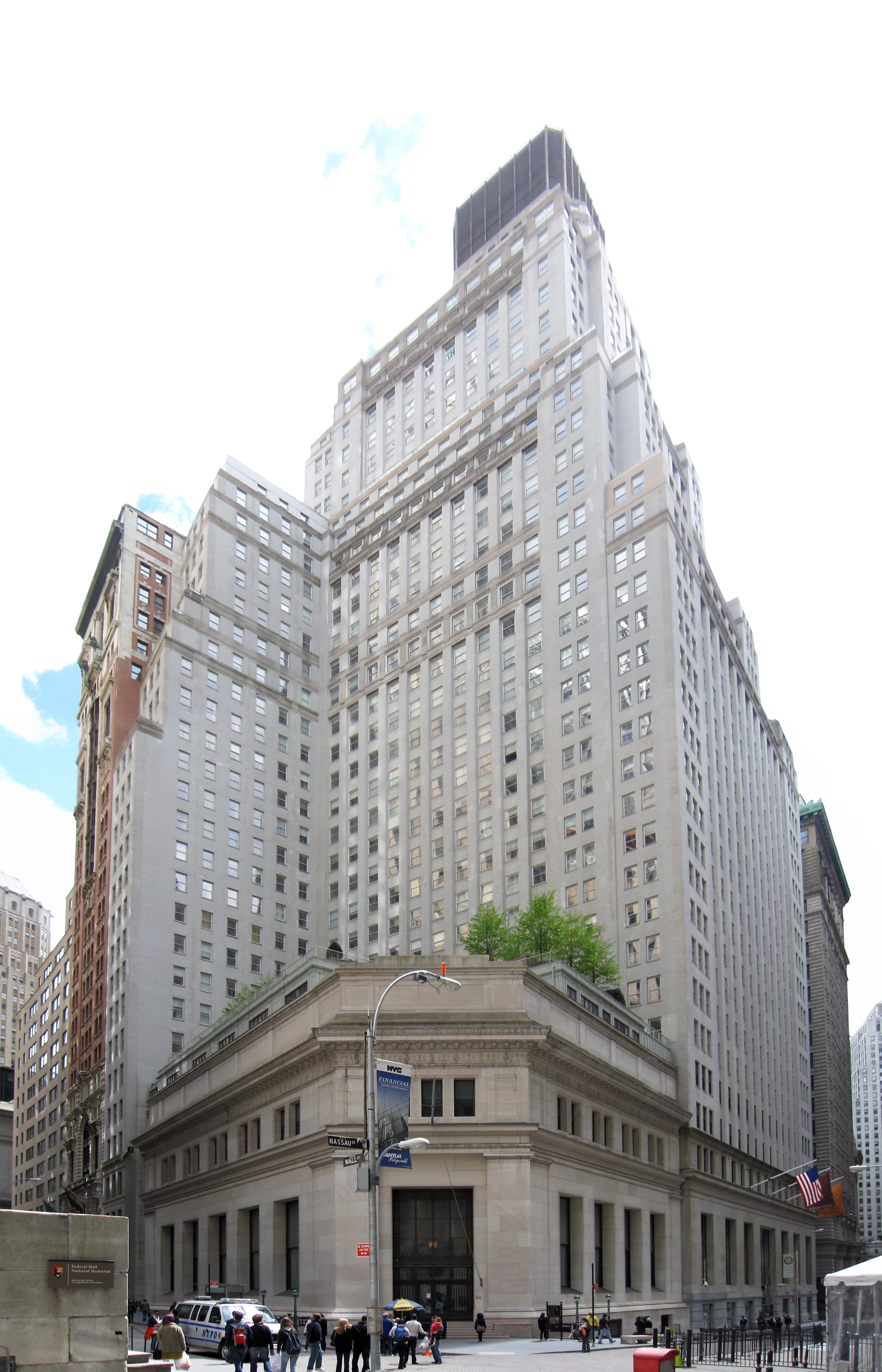
- Seen in the background; the smaller building in front at the street corner is 23 Wall Street
- Former names: Equitable Trust Building
- Alternative names: Downtown by Philippe Starck

General information
- Architectural style: Neoclassicism
- Location: Financial District, Manhattan, New York City, 15 Broad Street, New York, NY 10005
- Coordinates: 40°42′24″N 74°0′38″W
- Completed: 1928
- Renovated: 2005

Height
- Height: 551 feet (168 m)

Technical details
- Floor count: 43

Design and construction
- Architecture firm: Trowbridge & Livingston

15 Broad Street (formerly known as the Equitable Trust Building) is a residential condominium and former office building in the Financial District of Manhattan, New York City, on the eastern side of Broad Street between Wall Street and Exchange Place. It has entrances at 51 Exchange Place and 35 Wall Street.

It was completed in 1928 and ranked among the 20 largest office buildings in the world in 1931.

== Architecture ==
The building was built in the neoclassical style for the Equitable Trust Company and was therefore called the Equitable Trust Building. The architects were Trowbridge & Livingston, who also drew plans for the adjacent structures at 14 Wall Street, New York Stock Exchange Building annex, and 23 Wall Street. The builder was the Thompson–Starrett Co.

The layout of the building is L-shaped, wrapping around 23 Wall Street. The building is 540 feet high and has 43 floors. The assumed value in 1931 was $17,250,000. The facade is made out of grey brick stone, while the limestone base echoes the facade of neighboring 23 Wall Street. The rent area was 750,000 square feet (70,000 m^{2}); the interior was originally luxuriously fitted out.

== History ==
=== Construction and early years ===
15 Wall Street replaced the 10-story Mills Building (completed 1882) and another building on the site. The skyscraper contained a truss that spanned above 23 Wall Street. to allow the inclusion of this truss, J.P. Morgan & Co., which occupied the immediately adjoining 23 Wall Street, sold the air rights above that building to the Equitable Trust Company, for which 15 Broad Street was being constructed. To prevent damage to the older structure, heavy timbers were placed on 23 Wall Street's roof while the skyscraper was being built.

The building was completed in 1928. The Equitable Trust Co. was one of the units of the Chase National Bank organizations, one of the largest and most powerful banking institutions in the world at the time. The law firm Davis Polk & Wardwell was located in the predecessor building from around 1889 and moved out when it was demolished, but returned to the address into the newly completed building and stayed there until 1959.

=== First remodeling ===
In late 1955, J.P. Morgan & Co. arranged to purchase 15 Broad Street from the Chase Manhattan Bank, which then owned the building. Chase wanted to build a new headquarters at 28 Liberty Street and was selling 15 Broad Street to raise money for the project. Once the sale was concluded the following March, J.P. Morgan & Co. announced that Turner Construction would extensively renovate the building to plans by Rogers & Butler. The work involved adding air-conditioning, adding a ground-floor entrance at 35 Wall Street, and installing cooling towers on the roof. The work was to be complete in mid-1957. The building was also linked to 23 Wall Street as part of the project.

Morgan & Co. became the Morgan Guaranty Trust Company in 1959 following a merger with the Guaranty Trust Company. Morgan Guaranty considered constructing additional stories atop 23 Wall Street as well as replacing both structures with one headquarters. A major renovation commenced in the two buildings in 1962, in preparation for their conversion into a headquarters for Morgan Guaranty. The company's old headquarters at 140 Broadway was being demolished to make way for the Marine Midland Bank Building. The renovation was completed in 1964.

=== Condominium conversion ===
15 Broad Street and 23 Wall Street were sold in 2003 for $100 million to Africa Israel and Boymelgreen. The conversion came after plans to have the building demolished for a new stock exchange building were dropped. The building became a luxury condominium development called Downtown, designed by French product designer Philippe Starck along with project architect Ismael Leyva and developer A.I. & Boymelgreen, making it one of a growing number of residential buildings in the Financial District. Remodeling was largely completed at the end of May 2007.

According to Real Estate Weekly, by November 2006, 98% of the apartments had been sold. Prices for the 326 units ranged from about $335,000 for a studio to $4.6 million for a two-bedroom apartment with a terrace. The building is fitted with many amenities such as a gym, swimming pool, dance and yoga studio, squash court, bowling alley, business centre, movie theater, lounge and an in-house dry cleaning service amongst other things.

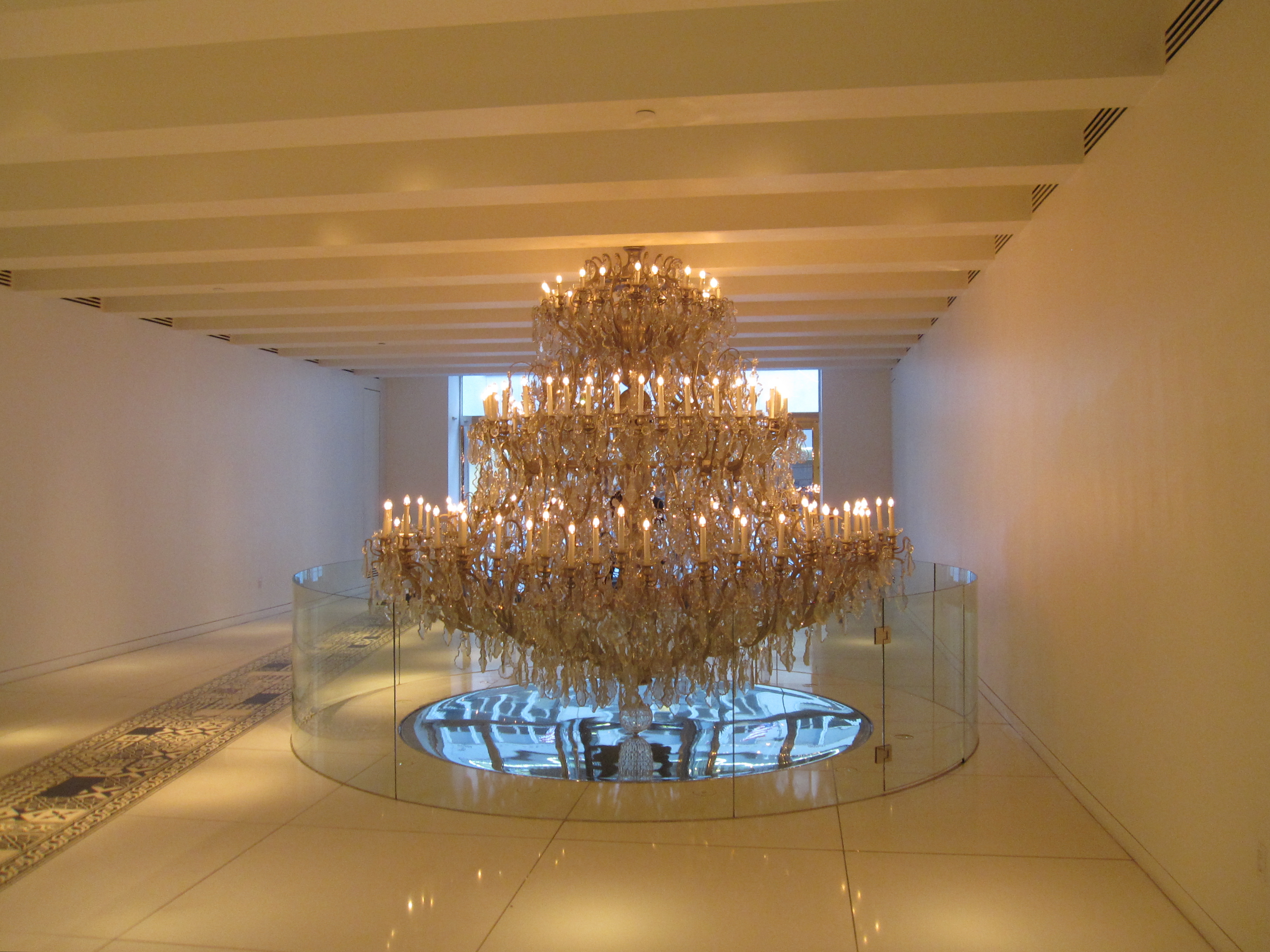
Crystal chandelier in the lobby of 15 Broad Street

The original 1,900-piece Louis Quinze chandelier that used to hang in the main hall of J. P. Morgan's 23 Wall Street was given by Morgan to be displayed in the lobby of 15 Broad Street. According to the architect Phlippe Starck, many pieces had come from Austria-Hungary before World War I and have been identified by him as Swarovski crystal. Starck made the roof of 23 Wall into a 5,000-square-foot (460 m^{2}) garden with children's pool and dining area, accessible to the residents of the development.
