= Exchange Place (Manhattan) =

Street in Manhattan, New York

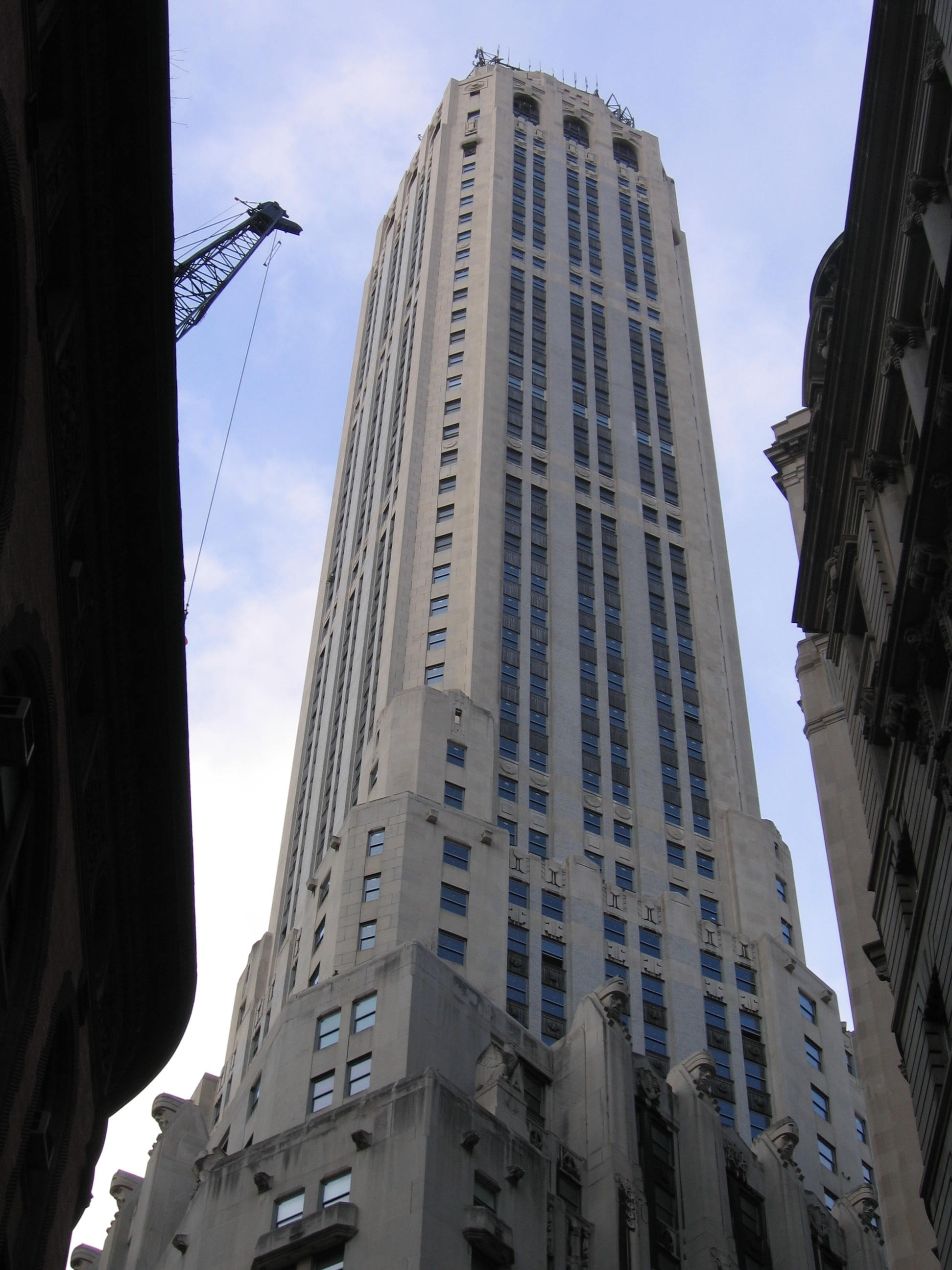
20 Exchange Place, located on the eastern end of Exchange Place

Exchange Place is a street in the Financial District of Lower Manhattan, New York City. The street runs five blocks between Trinity Place in the west and Hanover Street in the east.

Exchange Place was created by 1657 as part of the street plan for the Dutch colony of New Amsterdam (modern-day Lower Manhattan), as recorded in the Castello Plan. It is composed of parts of two colonial Dutch roads and survives largely as it existed in 1660, although it has been renamed multiple times and was extended in 1836. The current name, which dates from 1827, was derived from the New York Stock Exchange's presence near Exchange Place. Several points of interest are located along Exchange Place, including the New York Stock Exchange Building, 20 Exchange Place, and 55 Wall Street.

== History ==
Exchange Place was created by 1657, as outlined in the Castello Plan, a street map for the Dutch colony of New Amsterdam (modern-day Lower Manhattan); the street still survives largely as it existed in 1660. The street incorporates parts of two colonial Dutch roads: Heere Dwars Straet and Tuyn Straet. Heere Dwars Street (literally The Lord's Cross Street) ran two blocks between Broadway and Broad Street. Tuyn Street, named after gardens, ran one block from Broad Street to William Street. In colonial times, the area was swampland; to drain the swamp, a canal was dug from Exchange Place, along which Broad Street was subsequently built. The area surrounding Broad Street and Exchange Place was known as the "Schaap Weyte" or sheep pasture.

In 1692, a Dutch Reformed Church was erected at Exchange Place and Broad Street. The first church building was replaced in 1807, and the second church building burned down in 1835. The church's congregation sold off the site in the 1840s rather than rebuild it.

Tuyn Street was renamed Church Street in 1695 and Garden Street in 1797. Garden Street and Oyster Pasty Alley were renamed Exchange Place in 1827, after the Merchants Exchange Building at Wall and William Streets was built that year. In 1827, at the petition of property owners, the part of Garden Street between William Street and Pearl Street was named Exchange Place. An 1831 engraving in George Melksham Bourne's Views of New York is titled "Exchange Place, Looking to Hanover Street." The street's last extension to Hanover Street was made in 1836. By the 1830s, the demand for commercial space had increased significantly on Exchange Place and surrounding streets. Many residential buildings on the street were subsequently demolished, and commercial buildings were erected in their place. Exchange Place was a center for financial activity; in 1867, it was reported that $1.6 million had been stolen from one of the banks on Exchange Place. The 1939 WPA Guide to New York City stated that Exchange Place, together with Wall and Broad Streets, formed the core of Manhattan's Financial District.

== Notable buildings ==
Exchange Place contains several landmarks and other structures along its route. 1 Wall Street, a New York City designated landmark, is located on the north side of the street between Broadway and New Street. The New York Stock Exchange Building at 8–18 Broad Street, a National Historic Landmark and New York City designated landmark, is on the north side of Exchange Place between New and Broad Streets. The Broad Exchange Building is located at the southeast corner of Broad Street and Exchange Place, while the Continental Bank Building is on the southwest corner of that intersection and 15 Broad Street is on the northeast corner. The easternmost block of Exchange Place is taken up by two buildings: 55 Wall Street (a National Register of Historic Places listing and New York City landmark) on the north side and 20 Exchange Place (a New York City landmark) on the south side. In addition, the New York City Subway's Broad Street station, serving the J and Z trains, has entrances at Exchange Place and Broad Street.
