= James Otis Post =

American architect (1873–1951)

- Born: August 4, 1873; Bernardsville, New Jersey, US
- Died: April 21, 1951 (aged 77); Waltham, Massachusetts, US
- Education: Columbia University; École des Beaux-Arts
- Occupation: Architect
- Partner(s): George B. Post; William Stone Post
- Parent: George B. Post
- Practice: George B. Post and Sons

James Otis Post (August 4, 1873 – April 21, 1951) was an American architect. He worked with his father, George B. Post, and his brother, William Stone Post, in the New York City firm George B. Post and Sons.

== Early life ==
Post was born in Bernardsville, New Jersey, on August 4, 1873. He was the son of Alice Madilda Stone and George B. Post, a New York City architect known for designing skyscrapers.

Post received a B.Arch at Columbia University in 1895. While at Columbia, he was a member of the fraternity of Delta Psi (St. Anthony Hall). He also studied at the École des Beaux-Arts in Paris, France, receiving a diploma in 1900.

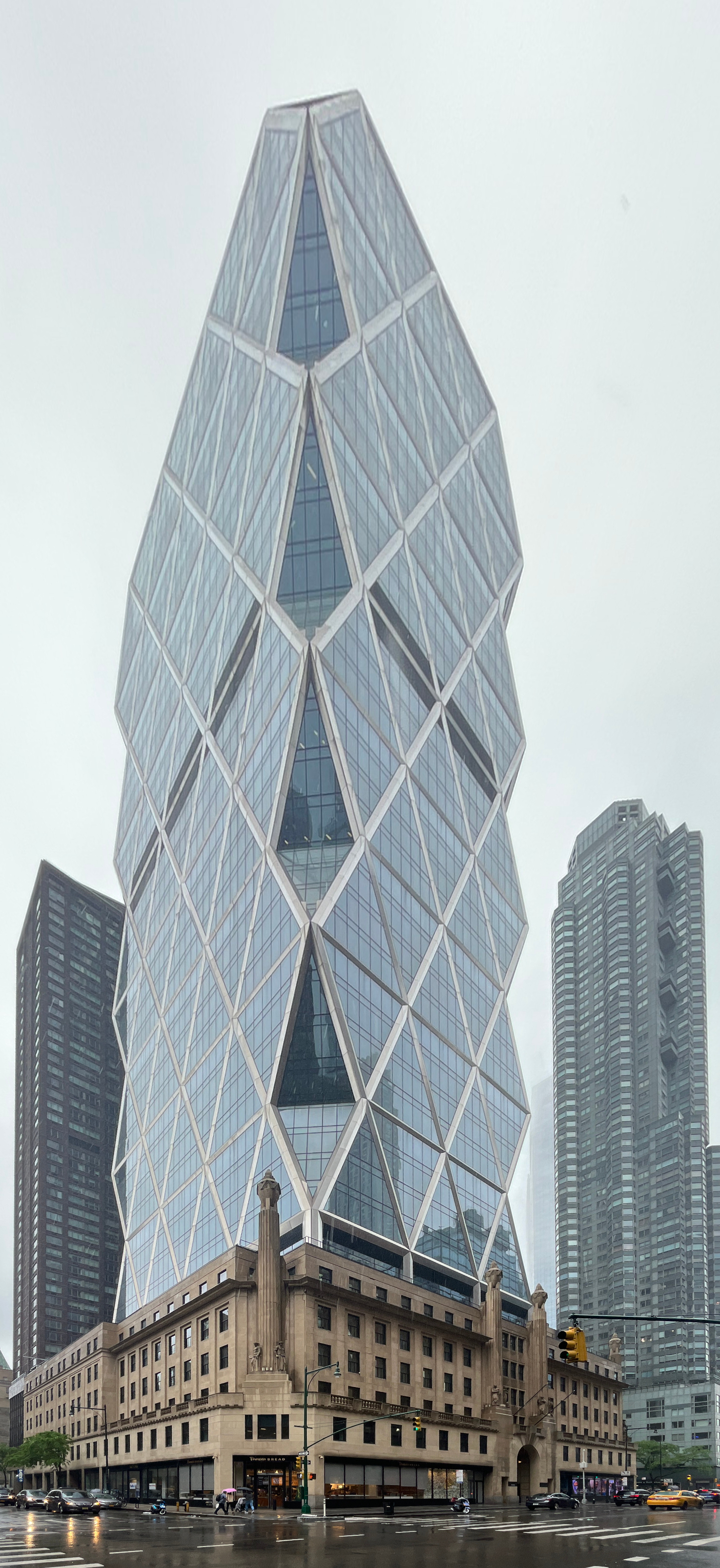
International Magazine Building, now called Hearst Tower

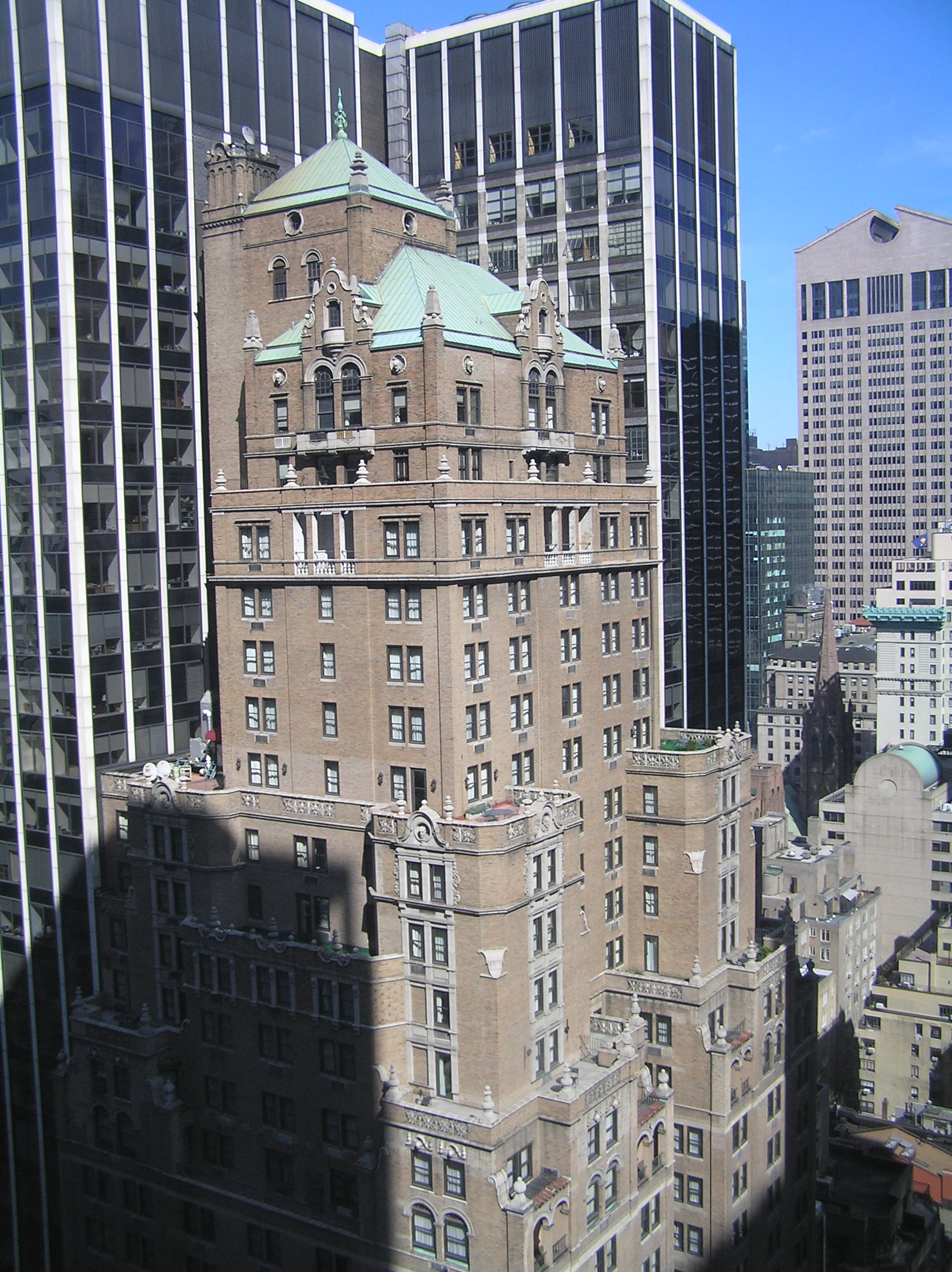
Warwick Hotel

== Career ==
In 1901, Post joined his father and his brother, William Stone Post, in the New York City firm George B. Post and Sons. He became a partner in the firm in 1904. Post managed the firm's offices in New York and Cleveland, Ohio. Some of his projects include the Cleveland Trust Company home office, the International Magazine Building, the National Town and Country Club, Roosevelt Hotel, the Stillman Theatre in Cleveland, the Warwick Hotel, and Wisconsin State Capitol.

Post was a consultant on the construction of cantonments for the Chief Engineer of the Army during World War I. He also helped design Cradock, Virginia for the United States Housing Bureau in 1918.

Post worked on designs for Statler Hotels in Boston, Massachusetts; Buffalo, New York; Cleveland, Ohio; Detroit, Michigan; and St. Louis, Missouri. His numerous hospital projects included Mount Sinai Hospital in Cleveland, Ohio; the Massena Municipal Hospital in Massena, New York; St. Mary's Hospital for Children in Bayside, Queens, New York; the Samaritan Hospital in Troy, New York; and the Stamford Hospital in Stamford, Connecticut.

Post was a fellow in the American Institute of Architects. He was a founder and the first president of the Beaux-Arts Institute of Design and chaired the education committee of the Society of Beaux Arts Architects. He was a member of the Committee of Architects and Engineers of the Institutions and Agencies of the State of New Jersey. He was also secretary of the American section of the International Congress of Architects.

== Personal life ==
Post married Dorothea Miller in 1918. Their sons were James Otis Post Jr., Edward Everett Post, and Richard Oliver Post.

Post lived at 101 Park Avenue in New York City. He belonged to the Beaux Arts Club, the Morris County Golf Club, the Morristown Club in New Jersey, the Racquet and Tennis Club, the Somerset Hills Country Club in New Jersey, the Union Club of Cleveland, the Union Club of the City of New York, the Union League Club, and the Virginia Club of Norfolk. He also served in Squadron A of the New York National Guard.

Later in life, Post lived with his son Edward in Cold Spring Harbor, New York. Post died after a long illness on April 21, 1951, in Waltham, Massachusetts.
