= Carl Roters =

American artist

Carl George Roters (1898–1989) was an American artist.

== Life ==
He was born in Brooklyn. He apprenticed with illustrator Edward A. Wilson. He lectured in Fine Arts at the Stevens Institute of Technology.

In 1938, he created a mural for Consolidated Edison at the New York World's Fair. He was commissioned to do murals for the Metropolitan Life Insurance Company, the Hotel Syracuse, and the Marine Midland Trust Company, and Monmouth College. In 1946, he joined the faculty of Syracuse University.

In 1954–1955, he won a competition to paint historic murals for the Jackson Lake Lodge In 1959, he installed the “Rendezvous Murals”, in the Jackson Lake Lodge.

Roters spent summers in Jackson Hole until he retired from Syracuse University when he retired there.

== Family ==
He was a partner of Nina Clemens Gabrilowitsch, the last living descendant of Mark Twain. In 1941, he married Ramona Morgan.
