= William Stone Post =

American architect (1866–1940)

- Born: May 10, 1866; New York City, New York, US
- Died: July 8, 1940 (aged 74); Bernardsville, New Jersey, US
- Education: Columbia University
- Occupation: Architect
- Partner(s): James Otis Post, George B. Post
- Parent: George B. Post
- Practice: George B. Post & Sons
- Buildings: Hotel Syracuse; National Town and Country Club; New York Stock Exchange Building; Roosevelt Hotel; Wisconsin State Capitol
- Projects: City College of New York

William Stone Post (May 10, 1866 – July 8, 1940) was an American architect. He is most noted for his work on City College of New York, the Wisconsin State Capitol, the National Town and Country Club, and the New York Stock Exchange Building.

== Early life ==
Post was born on May 10, 1866, in New York City. His parents were Alice Matilda Stone and George B. Post, an architect known for designing skyscrapers. In 1884, he graduated from St. Mark's School in Southborough, Massachusetts.

Post studied architecture and graduated from the Columbia University School and Arts and School of Mines in 1890 with a Ph.B. While at Columbia, he was a member of the fraternity of Delta Psi (St. Anthony Hall). After college, he traveled in Europe for a year.

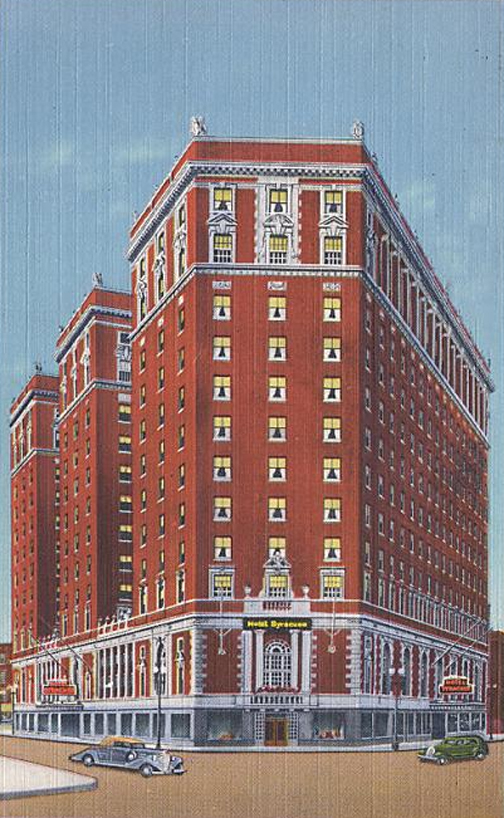
Hotel Syracuse

== Career ==
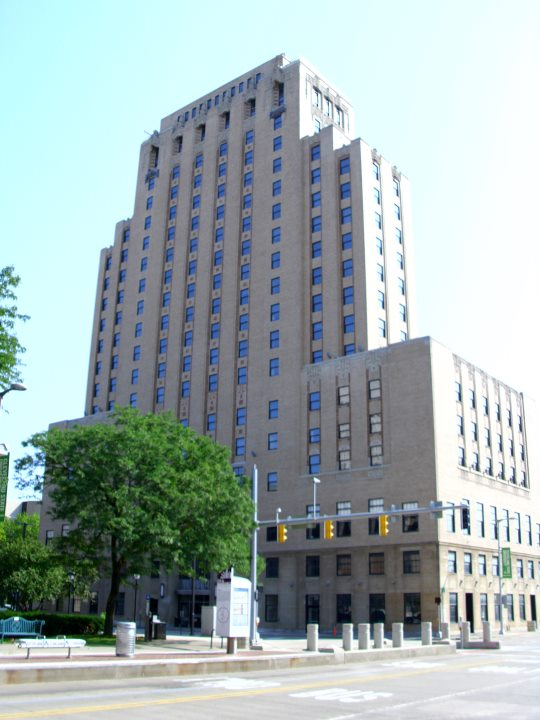
National Town and Country Club, now called Fenn Tower

Post joined the architectural firm George B. Post & Son. He became a partner in 1904, with the firm becoming George B. Post & Sons. His father and his brother, James Otis Post, also practiced with this firm.

Post collaborated with his father to design the New York Stock Exchange Building and the Wisconsin State Capitol. Post created and general plan and designed the buildings for City College of New York. His main focus was on hotels, designing the Roosevelt Hotel in New York City; Hotel Syracuse in Syracuse, New York; and hotels for the Statler Hotels in Boston, Massachusetts; Buffalo, New York; Cleveland, Ohio; Detroit, Michigan; and St. Louis, Missouri. Post also designed several other buildings in Cleveland, including Wade Park Manor (1923), Fenway Hall (1923), and the National Town and Country Club (1930).

Post retired in 1930 from George B. Post & Sons in 1930. He was a fellow of the American Institute of Architects and a member of the Architectural League of New York and the New York chapter of AIA.

== Personal life ==
Post lived in Bernardsville, New Jersey from circa 1902 until he died. He married Lillian Hood on June 14, 1884. She was the daughter of John Bell Hood, who was a lieutenant general in the Confederate States Army. The couple had three daughters.

Post was a member of the Century Club and the National Arts Club.

Post died from pneumonia in Bernardsville on July 8, 1940, at the age of 74.

== Selected projects ==
- New York Stock Exchange Building in Manhattan, New York (1903) - U.S. National Historic Landmark
- City College of New York in New York City, New York (c. 1906)
- Hotel Statler in Cleveland, Ohio (1912)
- Wisconsin State Capitol in Madison, Wisconsin (1917) - National Register of Historic Places
- Wade Park Manor in Cleveland, Ohio (1923)
- Fenway Hall Hotel in Cleveland, Ohio (1923)
- Roosevelt Hotel in Manhattan, New York (1924)
- Hotel Syracuse in Syracuse, New York (1924) - National Register of Historic Places
- National Town and Country Club (now Fenn Tower) in Cleveland, Ohio (1930) - National Register of Historic Places
