= Marriott Syracuse Downtown =

- Hotel Syracuse (Marriott Syracuse Downtown)
- U.S. National Register of Historic Places
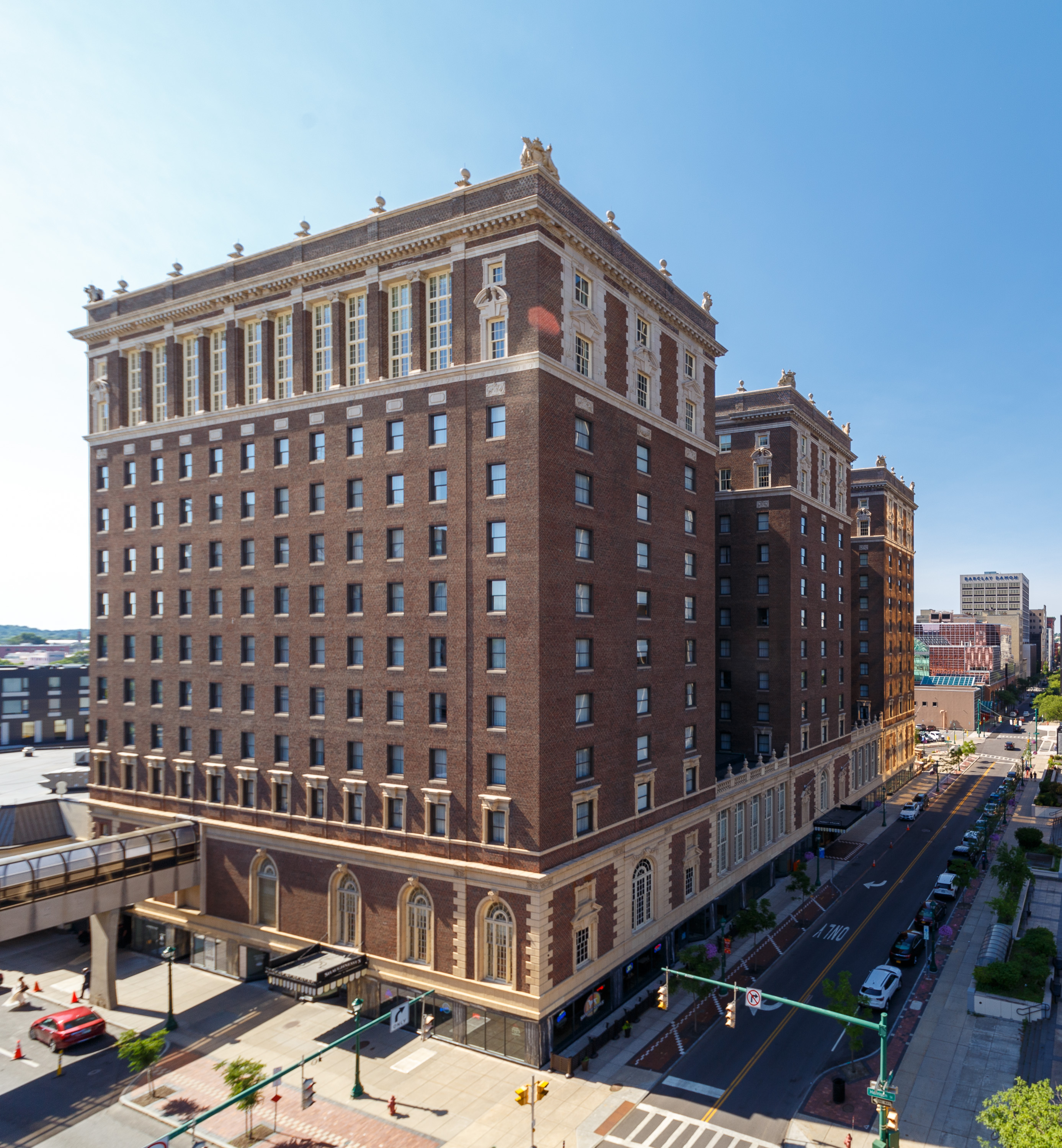

- Location within New York Location within the United States
- Location: 100 E. Onondaga St., Syracuse, New York
- Coordinates: 43°2′40.9″N 76°9′4.3″W
- Built: 1924
- Architect: William Stone Post
- Architectural style: Renaissance
- NRHP reference No.: 08000141
- Added to NRHP: March 5, 2008

The Marriott Syracuse Downtown is a historic hotel located at 100 E. Onondaga St., Syracuse, New York. It was built in 1924 as the Hotel Syracuse and was completely restored in 2016, when it joined the Marriott chain.

== Architecture ==
It is significant in that it is "an excellent example of an early 20th century modern hotel designed by one of the leading hotel designers of the day." It was designed by William Stone Post of George B. Post & Sons of New York City in 1921.

== History ==
Ground was broken for the building in 1922 and the Hotel Syracuse opened for business on August 16, 1924. Among its first guests that day was child star Jackie Coogan. The hotel celebrated its official opening a month later, on September 18, 1924, with its first event, a dinner for stockholders in the Grand Ballroom. In 1927, Charles Lindbergh visited the hotel to talk about his historic trans-Atlantic flight from New York to Paris in the Spirit of St. Louis.

In 1980 the hotel was renamed the Hilton at Syracuse Square. It was expanded with an extension containing the Imperial Ballroom and a new tower wing designed by William B. Tabler. The hotel left Hilton in the 1990s and returned to its original name. The massive 790-room Hotel Syracuse eventually found itself battling bankruptcy and closed in 2004.

=== Decade of closure ===
In December 2004, the city announced that a million-dollar payment by the chief creditor of the Hotel Syracuse would settle the unpaid property taxes dispute. This allowed the hotel to emerge from bankruptcy.

In August 2005, the Israeli firm GMUL agreed to buy the Hotel Syracuse and its garage and renovate the property into a new four-star hotel and condos. More detailed plans became public in December 2005, listing the following plans for the complex: 54 condominiums located in the 1980 tower, 155-room business hotel, 150 Apartments, Restoration of banquet facilities and street-level store-fronts, Rehabilitation of the complex's parking garage, Pool and gym

In May 2006, the Hotel Syracuse was sold to another Israeli company, AMERIS Holdings Ltd, as part of a larger package deal, which included other assets acquired from GMUL. AMERIS Holdings Ltd, controlled by Levi Kushnir and his son Elad, has a large portfolio of development across the globe and specifically in the USA. The new owners reconfigured some of the previous plans. Rather than selling condominiums in the tower, the condo portion of the project was to be shifted into the historic building. When ownership changed in 2006, Ameris Holdings ltd. reopened the banquet facilities, which had been closed for several years. Shortly after, the garage was fully renovated (Opened September 1, 2007), and the complex hosted some large-scale events, including the Syracuse Film Festival in April 2007. In July 2007, work began on converting the 1980 tower to apartments. Then-mayor Matt Driscoll committed to turning Onondaga Street near the hotel complex into a park, in order to push the development along. Hotel Syracuse was added to the National Register of Historic Places in 2008.

Ameris went bankrupt later in 2008, however, and work on the apartment tower was halted when about eighty percent complete. The 1980 tower, renamed Symphony Tower, was eventually severed from the rest of the building and sold to the Hayner Hoyt Corporation for $1.4 million in 2012. That sale was the focus of litigation for many years, and as of 2022, the Symphony Tower remains vacant.

=== Restoration ===
On April 14, 2013, Boston-based Pyramid Hotel Group made an offer of an undisclosed amount to the City of Syracuse to renovate and reopen the Hotel Syracuse. The City of Syracuse began a seizure process against the hotel's Israeli owners, GML, for $500,000 in unpaid taxes.

Ed Riley, senior vice president of project management for Pyramid Hotel Group, said that if the deal were to go through, the hotel would be reopened with 260–280 rooms. He estimated that a renovation would take 14–16 months, and cost over $60 million. Riley said the hotel's rooms are too small and badly outdated. They would need to be renovated and enlarged, with all-new bathrooms installed. He said the hotel's spacious lobby and its ballrooms need updating but are in relatively good shape and would be preserved. City officials have been pushing for a hotel to complement the 99,000 square foot Nicholas J. Pirro Convention Center. Hotel Syracuse is located a block and a half away; a revamped Hotel Syracuse could serve as a convention center hotel.

In 2014 Ed Riley acquired the Hotel Syracuse. In 2015 he began a $57 million restoration project in which gave the hotel 261 new guest rooms and returned all the major historic spaces to their former grandeur. On June 25, 2015, while restoration work was continuing, the hotel was renamed Marriott Syracuse Downtown. During the renovations, the hotel's main entrance was shifted from 500 S. Warren St. to the other side of the building, 100 E. Onondaga St. The hotel reopened on August 19, 2016. It was then also inducted into Historic Hotels of America, the official program of the National Trust for Historic Preservation, not long thereafter.

== See also ==
- Downtown Syracuse
