= Pontiac Hotel =

- U.S. National Register of Historic Places
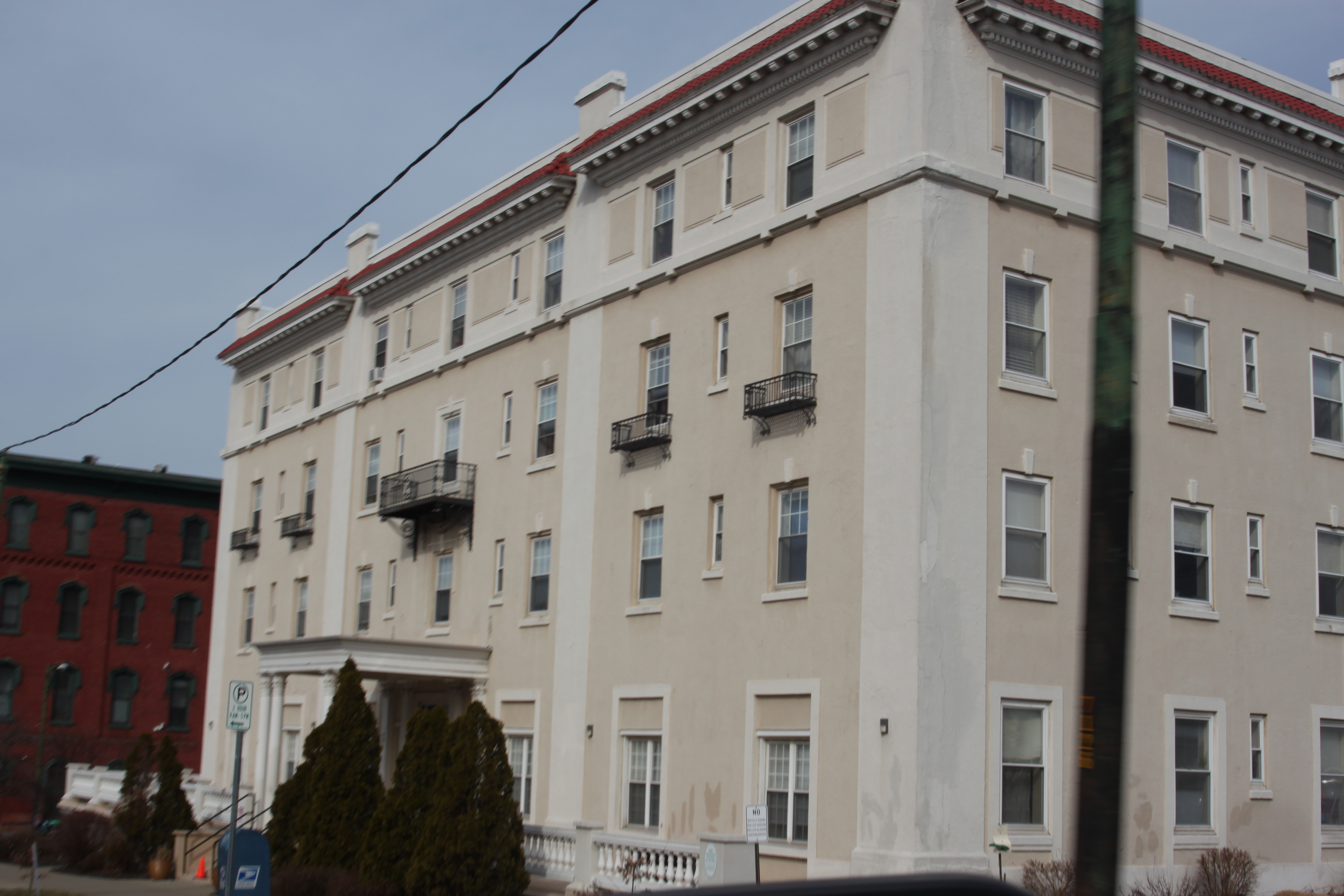
- Pontiac Hotel, February 2024

- Location within New York Location within the United States
- Location: W. 1st St., Oswego, New York
- Coordinates: 43°26′14″N 76°30′37″W
- Area: 0.6 acres (0.24 ha)
- Built: 1912
- Architect: Post, George B. and Sons
- Architectural style: Late 19th And 20th Century Revivals, Classical & Mission
- NRHP reference No.: 83001758
- Added to NRHP: July 21, 1983

Pontiac Hotel is an historic hotel located at Oswego in Oswego County, New York. It was built in 1912 and designed by the office of architect George B. Post (1837–1913). It was originally a four-story, U-shaped structure; in 1955 a one-story ballroom was added at the rear of the structure in the exterior courtyard. It features both Classical and Mission style details. The most distinctive interior feature is a 40-foot-diameter (12 m) rotunda centrally located on the main level. In the 1980s the structure was converted from hotel use to house 70 apartment units for the elderly.

It was listed on the National Register of Historic Places in 1983.
