= Roosevelt Hotel (Manhattan) =

Building in Manhattan, New York

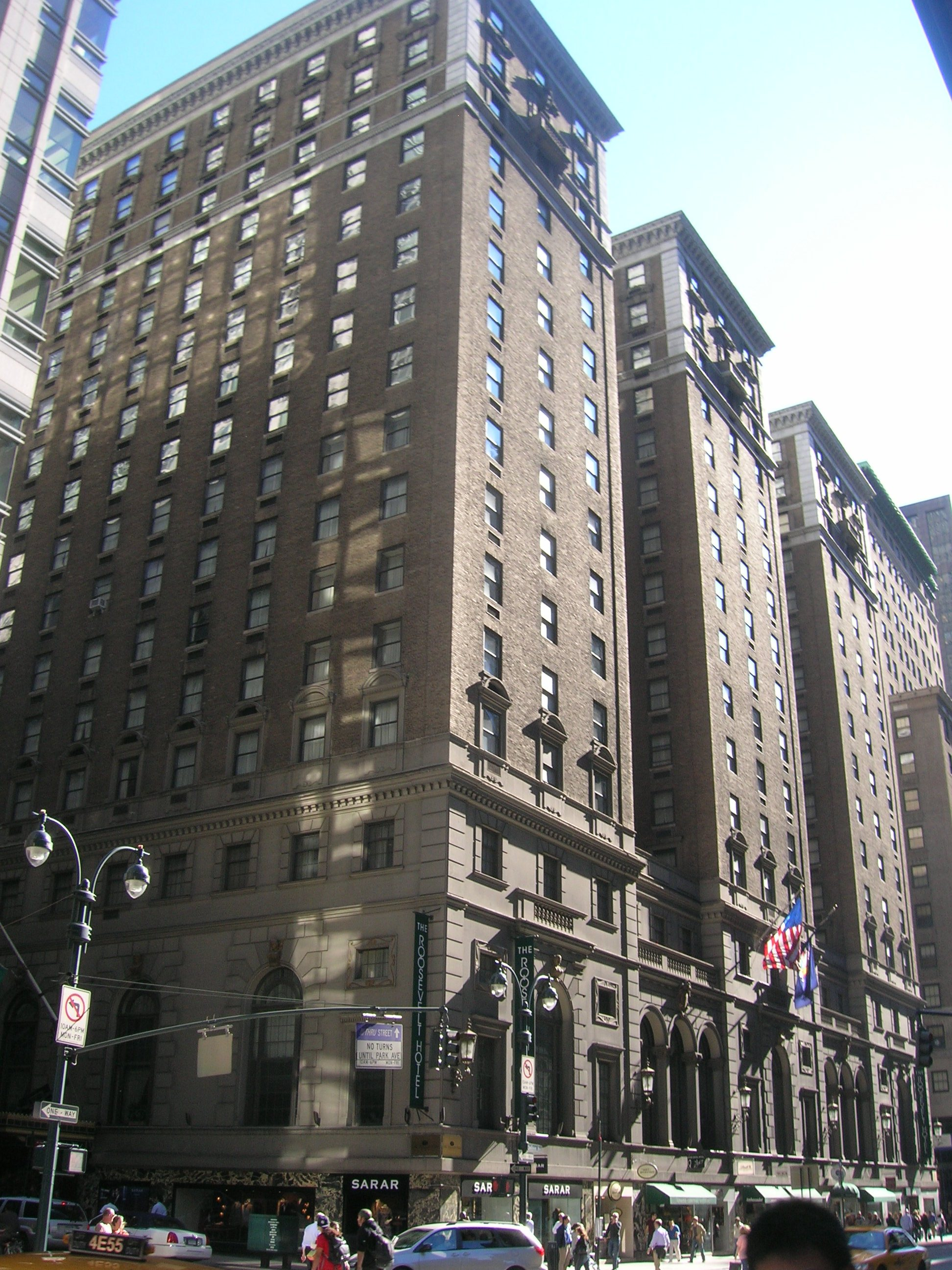

General information
- Location: Manhattan, New York City, 45 East 45th Street
- Coordinates: 40°45′17″N 73°58′39″W
- Opening: September 22, 1924
- Owner: Government of Pakistan

Design and construction
- Architects: William Stone Post; George B. Post & Sons

Other information
- Number of rooms: 1,025
- Number of restaurants: 2

Website
- www.theroosevelthotel.com

The Roosevelt Hotel is a former hotel at 45 East 45th Street in the Midtown Manhattan neighborhood of New York City. Named in honor of U.S. president Theodore Roosevelt, the hotel was developed by the New York Central Railroad and the New York, New Haven and Hartford Railroad and opened in 1924. The 19-story structure was designed by William Stone Post of George B. Post & Son with an Italian Renaissance Revival-style facade, as well as interiors that resembled historical American buildings. The Roosevelt Hotel is one of several large hotels developed around Grand Central Terminal as part of Terminal City. Since 2000, Pakistan International Airlines (PIA) has owned the structure.

The building contains setbacks to comply with the 1916 Zoning Resolution, as well as light courts above the third story on Madison Avenue. The hotel was mostly constructed above Grand Central Terminal's railroad tracks, and different structural frameworks were used in the lower and upper stories. The ground level largely contained stores, and the lobby, dining rooms, and other public rooms were one floor above ground. The third through 18th floors contained 1,025 rooms. When the Roosevelt opened, it contained several novel features, including a kennel for guests' pets, a child-care service, and an in-house doctor.

The Roosevelt Hotel opened on September 22, 1924, and was originally operated by New York United Hotels Inc., a subsidiary of the United Hotels Company. After New York United Hotels went bankrupt in 1934, Roosevelt Hotels Inc. took over the hotel. Hilton Hotels took over management of the Roosevelt in 1943, eventually acquiring full ownership of the hotel, and sold it to the Hotel Corporation of America in 1956 following an antitrust lawsuit. Realty Hotels, a holding company run by the New York Central, took over the hotel in 1964. Paul Milstein acquired the hotel in 1978 and leased the hotel to PIA the following year. PIA and Prince Faisal bin Khalid bin Abdulaziz Al Saud bought the hotel in 2000, and PIA then acquired Prince Faisal's ownership stake. The hotel closed in 2020 due to continued financial losses associated with the COVID-19 pandemic. It reopened in 2023 as a shelter for asylum seekers, in which capacity it operated for two years.

== Site ==
The Roosevelt Hotel is at 45 East 45th Street in the Midtown Manhattan neighborhood of New York City. It occupies an entire city block bounded by Madison Avenue to the west, 46th Street to the north, Vanderbilt Avenue to the east, and 45th Street to the south. The land lot covers about 43,313 ft^{2} (4,023.9 m^{2}) with a frontage of 200.83 ft (61.21 m) on either avenue and 215.67 ft (65.74 m) on either street. Nearby buildings include 383 Madison Avenue to the north, 245 Park Avenue to the northeast, the Helmsley Building to the east, the MetLife Building and Grand Central Terminal to the southeast, and the Yale Club of New York City Building to the southeast.

The hotel was built above Grand Central Terminal's underground railroad tracks. It was one of several structures built above the railroad tracks during the early 20th century. Other such structures included the Hotel Marguery to the north, the New York Central Building (now Helmsley Building) to the east, and the Yale Club and Biltmore Hotel to the south.

== Architecture ==
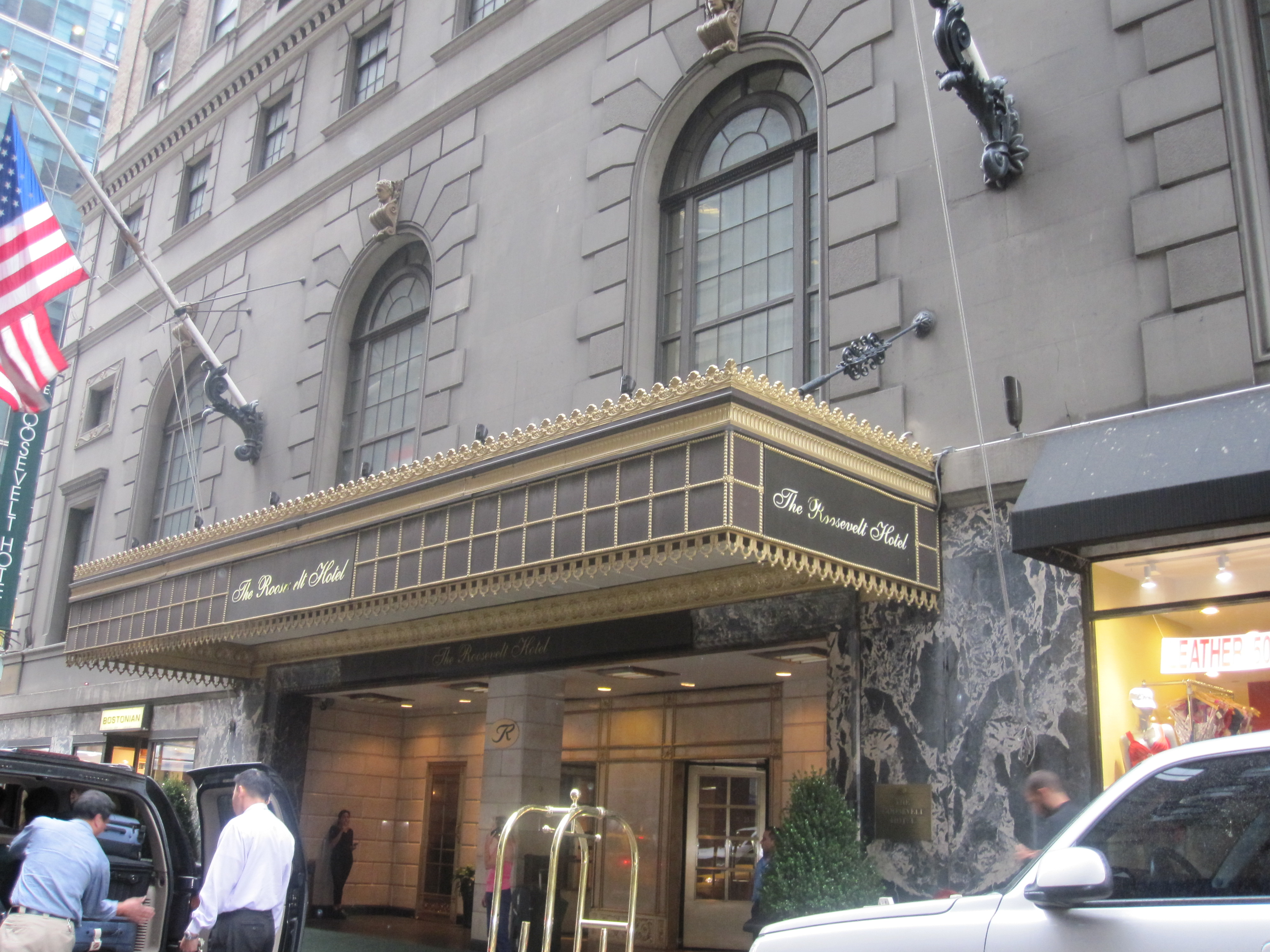
Marquee and entranceway

The Roosevelt Hotel was designed by William Stone Post of the architectural firm of George B. Post & Son for its original operator, the United Hotels Company. The hotel building is 19 stories high, and there are also three basement levels. Some contemporary sources describe the hotel as being 22 stories high, although this figure includes mezzanines and the ground story. According to plans published by Architecture and Building magazine, the hotel building is 250 feet (76 m) tall.

=== Form and facade ===
The hotel building contains setbacks to comply with the 1916 Zoning Resolution; it was one of the first major hotels in New York City to be developed after the resolution was enacted. The first three stories of the hotel occupy nearly the entire site. To the west, on the Madison Avenue elevation of the facade, there are two light courts above the third story, and there is a setback above the 18th story. To the east, on the Vanderbilt Avenue elevation, there is a light court at the center, as well as setbacks above the 11th, 15th, and 18th stories. On the 12th story, the rooms on the eastern wing contained French doors, which opened out onto roof gardens. Many of the rooms on the 16th through 18th stories also opened onto roof gardens.

When the Roosevelt opened, it was characterized as having an Italian Renaissance Revival-style exterior. The hotel has a facade of Indiana limestone with terracotta trim, while the main exterior walls are made of light colored brick. The main entrance to the hotel was placed on 45th Street, though there were additional guest entrances on 46th Street and on Vanderbilt Avenue. Near the northern end of the Vanderbilt Avenue elevation was a service entrance. The ground level contained storefronts on three sides. The lowest horizontal course of the facade is made of black Belgian marble. The walls of the first story are made of grand antique marble from southern France, framing the storefronts. One contemporary writer described the ground-level storefronts as one of the "novel and salient features" of the hotel.

=== Structural features ===
The structure uses 10,000 short tons (8,900 long tons; 9,100 t) of steel. The frame could carry a total load of 560,000 short tons (500,000 long tons; 510,000 t), and the strongest individual column in the superstructure was capable of carrying 2,000 short tons (1,800 long tons; 1,800 t). About two-thirds of the building's foundation sits above two levels of Metro-North Railroad (Note: Though historically operated by the New York Central Railroad, the tracks have since become part of the Metro-North Railroad.) tracks just north of Grand Central Terminal, rather than being attached to the bedrock itself. To avoid interfering with the railroad tracks under the hotel, most of the pillars in the steel superstructure are placed high above ground. With few exceptions, the hotel building and the tracks beneath it are supported by different frameworks. The foundations of the hotel building are all constructed atop vibration-absorbing lead pads.

The first story includes several spaces designed without columns, such as the main lobby, palm court, dining room, and breakfast rooms. The second story is surrounded by large trusses, creating large clear spans above the first story; the trusses are encased within thick partitions. Each of the trusses carries up to 1,500 short tons (1,300 long tons; 1,400 t). Typically, the space between the trusses would have been usable only as storage space. By creating door openings between the trusses' diagonals, the hotel's structural engineers were able to add a full second story between the trusses. The trusses also redistribute the loads from the upper stories, since different sets of columns are used above and below the second story. The upper chords of each truss, corresponding to the second-story ceiling, contain footings for the upper-story columns, which rise 17 stories. The upper chords are divided into 50-foot (15 m) sections, each of which contains footings for two columns.

On the third through 18th floors, each story contains central corridors surrounded by guestrooms. The slab-to-slab height of each story is 10 feet 2 inches (3.10 m), although the ceilings in each room are 8 feet 2 inches (2.5 m) high. The superstructure is divided into square modules, each with two guestrooms, two bathrooms, and two dressing rooms. There are steel columns at each corner of each guestroom, which are hidden within partitions. The side walls of each corridor contain girders, which are also placed within partitions. The easternmost portions of each story, as well as the exterior wall on Vanderbilt Avenue, are cantilevered 4 feet (1.2 m) past the outermost set of columns. There are additional girders just below each of the upper-story setbacks; these girders support the columns above the setbacks.

=== Mechanical features ===
Near the center of the hotel were six passenger elevators, five service elevators, and one freight elevator. Garbage and laundry chutes were placed next to the service elevators. The Roosevelt Hotel produced much of its own steam, in contrast to other buildings in the area, which purchased steam from the New York Central Railroad because they did not have space for mechanical equipment. The Roosevelt purchased high-pressure steam from the railroad, but the hotel generated its own low-pressure steam using exhaust from engine generators, compressors, and auxiliaries.

On the second floor, there was a telephone exchange with 75 trunk lines and a telephone switchboard with 98 lines. The Roosevelt originally contained teletype machines, which at the time of the hotel's opening were a novelty. When the hotel opened, its telephone booths were directly connected to the ventilation system; before air conditioning became popular, the ventilation system provided cool air to the booths during the summer.

=== Interior ===
The Roosevelt Hotel's interior was described as being in an "early American" style. Many of the public rooms were intended to resemble 18th- and 19th-century buildings in the former Thirteen Colonies. For instance, the hotel included replicas of decorative details from 18th- and 19th-century mansions, such as Homewood in Baltimore, Maryland; the Octagon House in Washington, D.C.; Gordon House in Savannah, Georgia; and Gibbs House in Charleston, South Carolina. The early American style was also chosen for practical reasons, as it was cheaper than any other architectural style, especially given the high costs of developing the hotel above the railroad tracks. Unlike most buildings in the U.S., the first floor was one story above the ground floor.

The Roosevelt had 30,000 square feet (2,800 m^{2}) of meeting and exhibit space, including two ballrooms and 17 additional meeting rooms ranging in size from 300 to 1,100 square feet (28 to 102 m^{2}). It had a business center, a concierge, fitness center, safety deposit boxes, valet laundry, valet or self-parking, and 15 retail tenants. The hotel originally had about 658,000 square feet (61,100 m^{2}), of which 69 percent was revenue-producing space such as storefronts, restaurants, and guestrooms. Some of the Roosevelt's "utility spaces" (such as the beauty parlor, barber shop, and the Victorian-style Turkish baths) were placed above ground, rather than in the basement, as was common in older hotels. Members of the public could visit the lobby even if they were not guests of the hotel, and the lobby became a popular tourist attraction.

==== Basements ====
Floor plans of the Roosevelt's basements, facing east

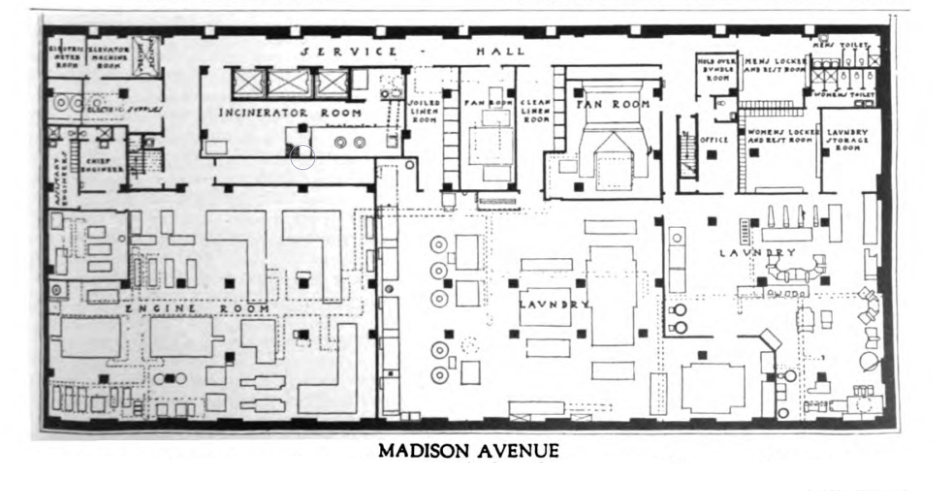
Third basement

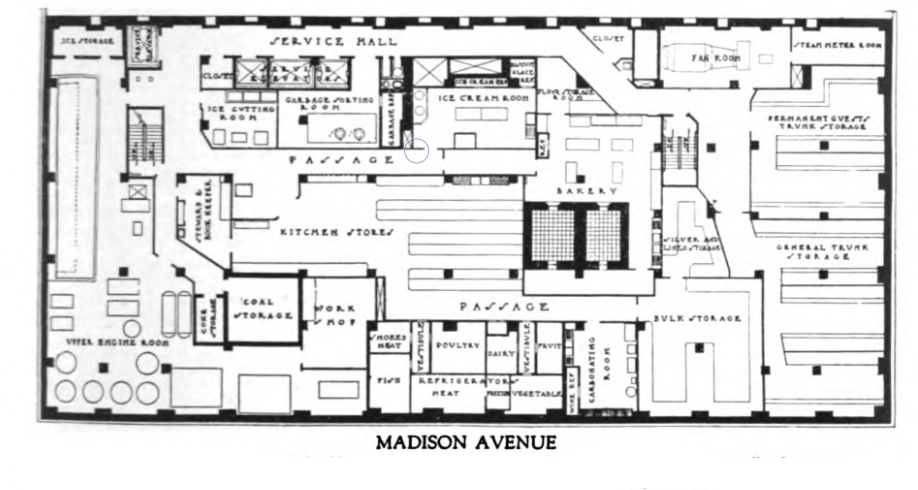
Second basement

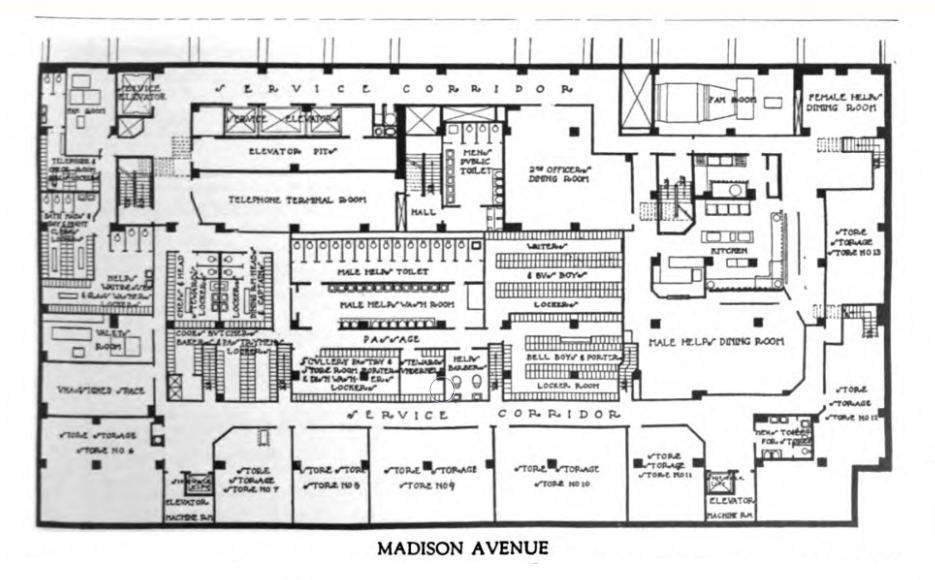
First basement

The hotel had three basements, which were excavated out of the underlying bedrock. Due to the presence of the railroad tracks, the basement levels cover only the western portion of the site; each basement level covered approximately 20,000 square feet (1,900 m^{2}). The lowest level was the third basement, which contained a heating plant, engine room, fan room, and guest laundry. The second basement contained a staff bakery, ice-making machines, and various storage rooms for housekeeping. There was also a garbage-sorting room and an incineration room in the second basement. The first basement included storage space for the ground-level storefronts, in addition to a kitchen, cafeteria, locker room, and service facilities for the hotel's staff. There were separate dining rooms for male staff, female staff, and the second officers (who helped manage the hotel) on the first basement level.

The first basement formerly contained a passageway leading directly to Grand Central Terminal. This passageway also connected the hotel to the New York City Subway's Grand Central–42nd Street station via the terminal's corridors. Additional passageways connected with other buildings such as the Biltmore and Commodore hotels, the Yale Club Building, the Graybar Building, and the Chrysler Building. The entrance to the passageway was from the first story, next to the elevators. The corridor was closed by the late 20th century, and the gate between the hotel and Grand Central Terminal was permanently locked by the beginning of the 21st century. A clothing store moved into the space formerly occupied by the passageway's entrance in 2008, and the corridor was sealed off around 2014.

==== Ground story ====
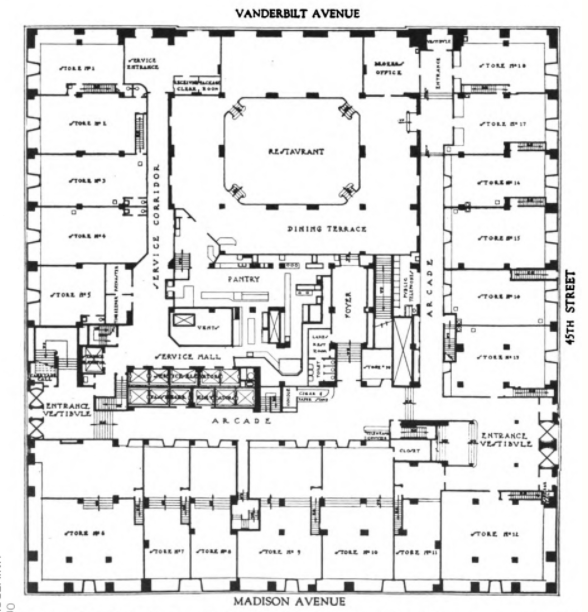
Ground story plan

The ground level covered about 42,000 square feet (3,900 m^{2}) and contained the shops, as well as a restaurant and pantry. Immediately past the vestibule, a stairway ascended from the arcade to the first-floor lobby; this staircase was decorated with iron panels from New York City Hall. An arcade led between the 45th Street entrance to the south and the 46th Street entrance to the north. The arcade was decorated with sidelights, inspired by those in 18th- and 19th-century residence. A small flight of stairs led up from the arcade's northern end to the 46th Street entrance. Near the southern end of the ground story, another passageway led from the arcade east to the Vanderbilt Avenue entrance. A service lobby, at the northeast corner of the ground floor, led to the service and freight elevators.

Also at ground level were storefronts along Madison Avenue, 45th Street, and 46th Street. There were 18 storefronts in total, consisting of six on Madison Avenue, seven on 45th Street, and five on 46th Street. The storefronts on Madison Avenue and 45th Street could be accessed both from the street and from passageways inside the hotel. The storefronts could also be accessed from the first story and the mezzanine due to the intricate floor layout.

East of the arcade was a vestibule leading to a grill room on Vanderbilt Avenue; this vestibule was designed in a similar style to St. Paul's Chapel in lower Manhattan. The grill room was at the center of the Vanderbilt Avenue elevation and contained a dance floor surrounded by a slightly raised dining area. Originally known as the Vanderbilt Avenue Room or the Mayflower Grill, the grill room was subsequently known as the Roosevelt Grill, serving American food and regional specialties for breakfast. There was a pantry directly next to the grill room, below a kitchen on the first floor. The pantry contained a serving counter built atop a structural beam, which could not be removed because it spanned a set of railroad tracks. Before the hotel closed in 2020, the ground story also contained the Vander Bar, a bistro serving craft beers.

==== First story and mezzanine ====
Floor plans of the Roosevelt's first story, mezzanine, and second story, facing east

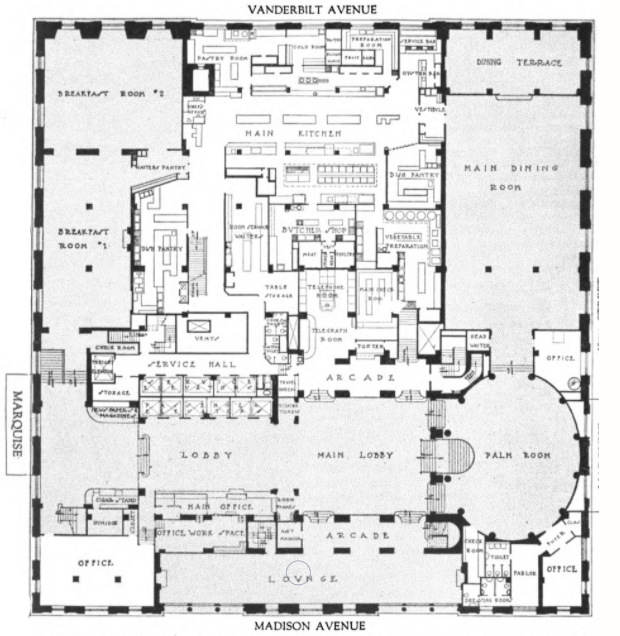
First story

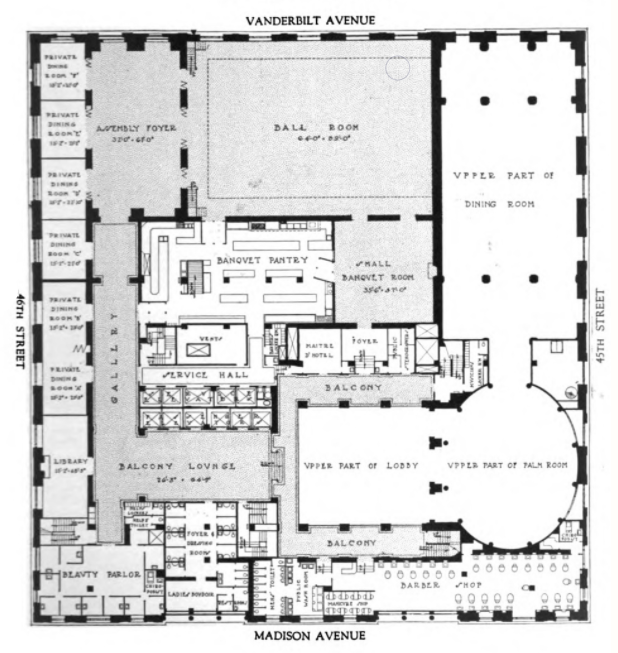
Mezzanine

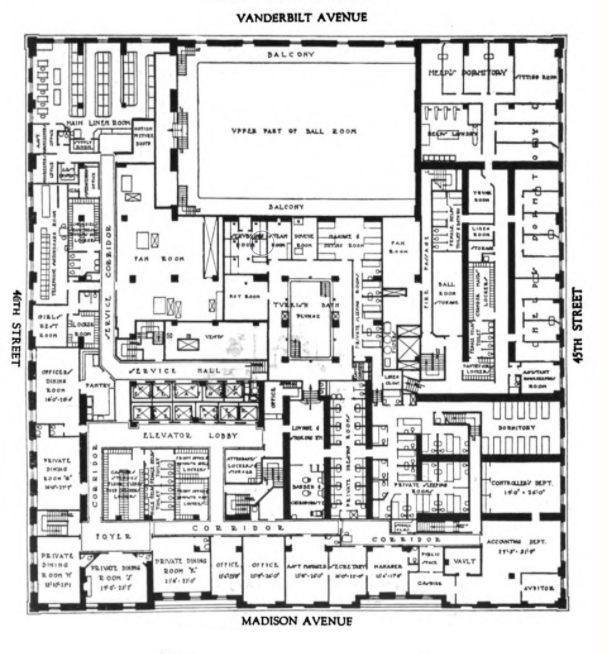
Second story

The first floor was the same size as the ground story and contained most of the public rooms. The main lobby was a double-height space, which had travertine walls and pilasters, as well as a plaster coffered ceiling painted in ivory and gold. Leading west from the main lobby, a small set of stairs led up to a lounge overlooking Madison Avenue, on the western side of the first floor. Known as the Madison Club Lounge, it measured 20 feet (6.1 m) wide and was patterned after a house in Coventry, Connecticut. The lounge was furnished in the Colonial style.

An arcade led east of the main lobby, with a check room, porter's room, telephone room, and telegraph office. North of the main lobby was a "working lobby", which contained a reception desk on the western wall and passenger elevators on the eastern wall. To the north of the working lobby, a short flight of steps led up to a foyer for the Colonial Room, the hotel's breakfast room. The foyer's northern wall contained a life-size portrait of Theodore Roosevelt at its center. There was another lounge west of the foyer, named the John Alden Room; it contained fireplace mantels topped by large paintings that depicted romantic scenes from Henry Wadsworth Longfellow's poem Evangeline.

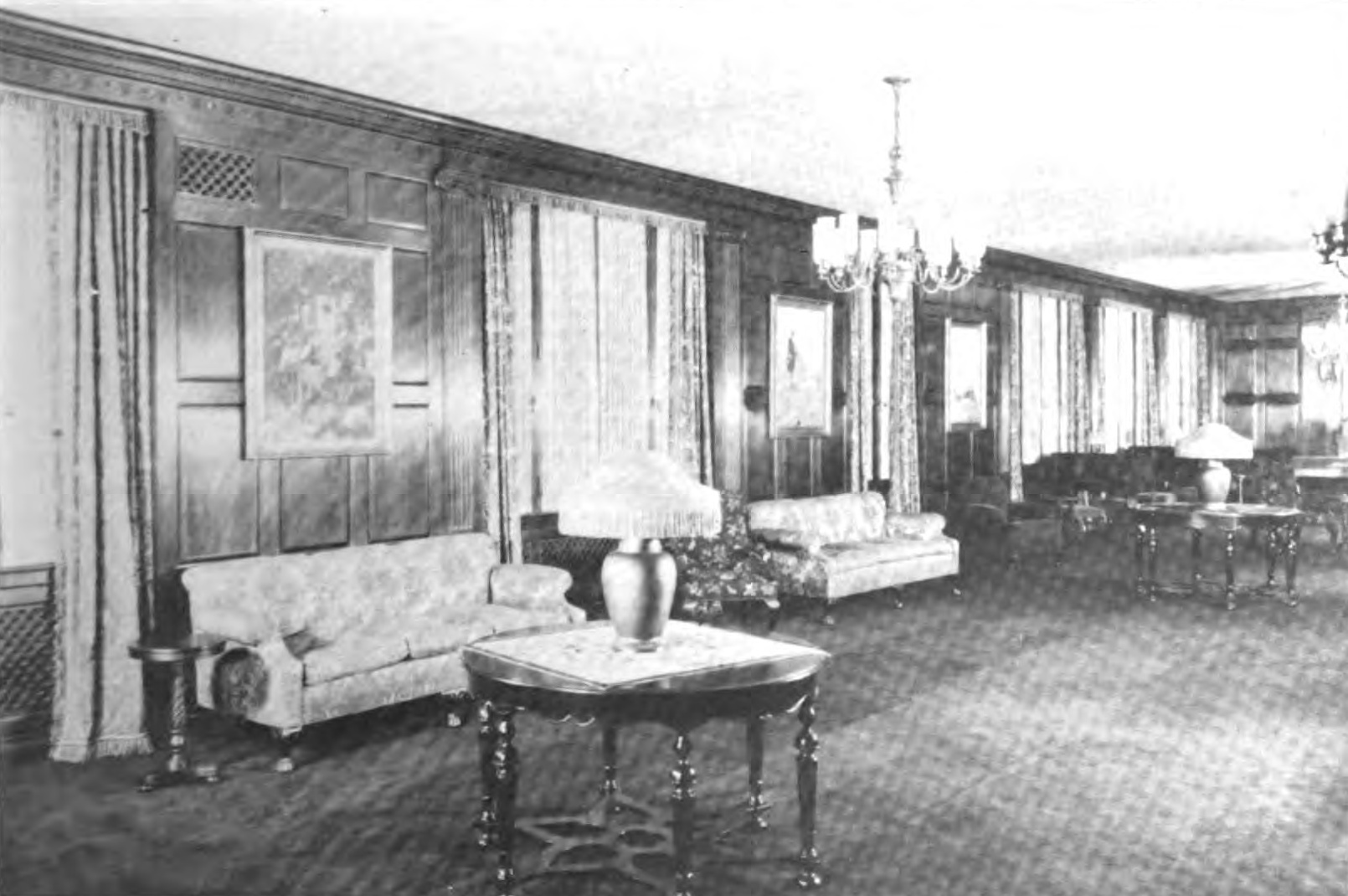
The John Alden Room on the first story

A palm room, main dining room, and dining terrace were on the south side of the first floor. The palm room was a triple-height elliptical tea room just south of, and a few steps above, the lobby. Designed in the Adam style, the palm room was the only public room on the first floor not designed in an early American style. Three steps led up from the palm room to the dining room, named for Hendrik Hudson. The main dining room was patterned after the mayor's office at New York City Hall. The dining room was furnished in the Chippendale style, and it contained three murals by N. C. Wyeth, which depicted Hudson's ship Halve Maen. To the north were a pair of breakfast rooms, named for Pilgrim settlers John Alden and Myles Standish. The breakfast rooms were decorated with Colonial-style wallpaper and woodwork.

There was a kitchen on the eastern side of the first floor, surrounded on three sides by the main dining room and breakfast rooms. The kitchen was divided into multiple sections, including a dishwashing division, butcher's shop, refrigeration room, waiters' pantry, and room-service pantry. The kitchen was directly above the ground-floor grill room and directly below the mezzanine-level ballrooms, allowing food to be delivered quickly to these rooms. Dumbwaiters and stairs led to pantries at ground level and on the mezzanine.

There was a mezzanine level directly above the first floor, spanning 30,000 square feet (2,800 m^{2}). At the mezzanine level, a balcony overlooked the main lobby on three sides; it had an iron balustrade salvaged from an old residence on Irving Place in Manhattan. This balcony was accessed by a lounge directly above the working lobby. Also at the mezzanine level were a gallery and assembly room on 46th Street, as well as a ballroom that faced Vanderbilt Avenue. The double-height ballroom was originally known as the Colonial Ballroom; it later became the Grand Ballroom, which could fit 400 guests.

The Colonial Ballroom included architectural details inspired by Southern mansions, a movie projection screen, and three Arthur Crisp murals that depicted scenes from the fairy tale Cinderella. Next to the Colonial Ballroom was the Terrace Ballroom, which could fit 175 guests. The north side of the mezzanine had six private dining rooms, served by a pantry directly above the kitchen. There was also a library dedicated in memory of Theodore Roosevelt. In addition, the west side of the mezzanine had a barber shop, a beauty parlor, and bathrooms.

==== Upper-story amenity spaces ====
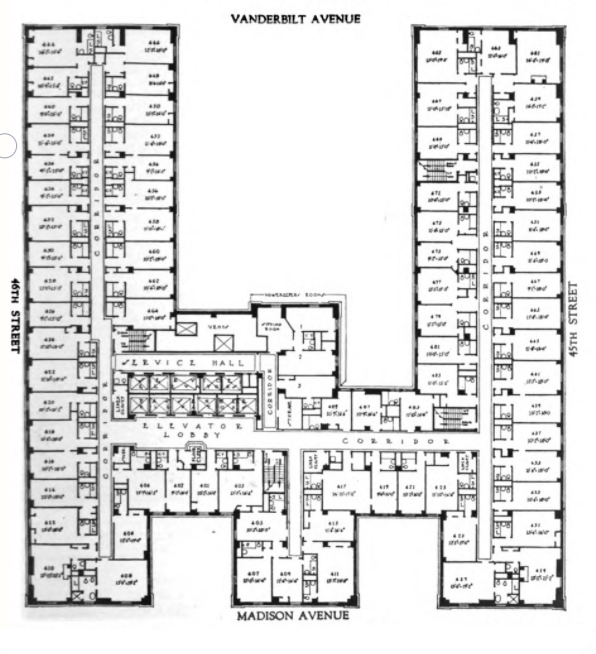
A typical floor plan inside the Roosevelt Hotel

The second floor covered 37,000 square feet (3,400 m^{2}) and was surrounded by the trusses above the first story. It contained several small dining rooms and hotel offices. The dining rooms were placed along both Madison Avenue and 46th Street, while the executive offices and accounting department faced Madison Avenue. There was also a linen room, a fan room, and maids' dormitories on the second floor. At the center of the second floor was a Turkish bath. The maids' dormitories were connected to the housekeeper's and assistant housekeeper's offices via a passageway under the Turkish bath.

Connecting with the Turkish bath were 50 guest booths, which were furnished as dressing rooms and were rented at a discount compared to the guestrooms. The booths were intended for guests who wanted to stay for only a few hours, and they also provided temporary guest accommodations when no guestrooms were available. Half of the booths contained cots. On the far eastern end of the second floor, a balcony overlooked the ballroom on three sides.

The guestrooms started on the third story, although part of this story contained a roof garden and ventilation fans for the upper stories. The third floor also contained a health clinic, which consisted of separate waiting rooms for guests and servants, as well as restrooms, treatment rooms, and suites for the hotel's in-house doctors. Above the 16th-story setback at the southeast corner of the building was a children's nursery, which contained a play area known as the Teddy Bear Cave. During sunny days, children were allowed to play on the adjacent rooftop. This made the Roosevelt among the first hotels in New York City with a health club and childcare center.

The 19th floor covered 14,000 square feet (1,300 m^{2}). It contained the hotel's paint, carpentry, print locksmith's, and electricians' departments, as well as dormitories for female staff. There was also a "guest valet room", where guests could iron and dry-clean their clothes. Above the 19th story was storage space for furniture, as well as a water tank with a capacity of 35,000 U.S. gallons (130,000 L). The rooftop also contained a dog kennel, the first such facility at any hotel in New York City. In 2008, the Mad46 bar opened on the hotel's 19th floor, with its own entrance from the street.

==== Rooms ====
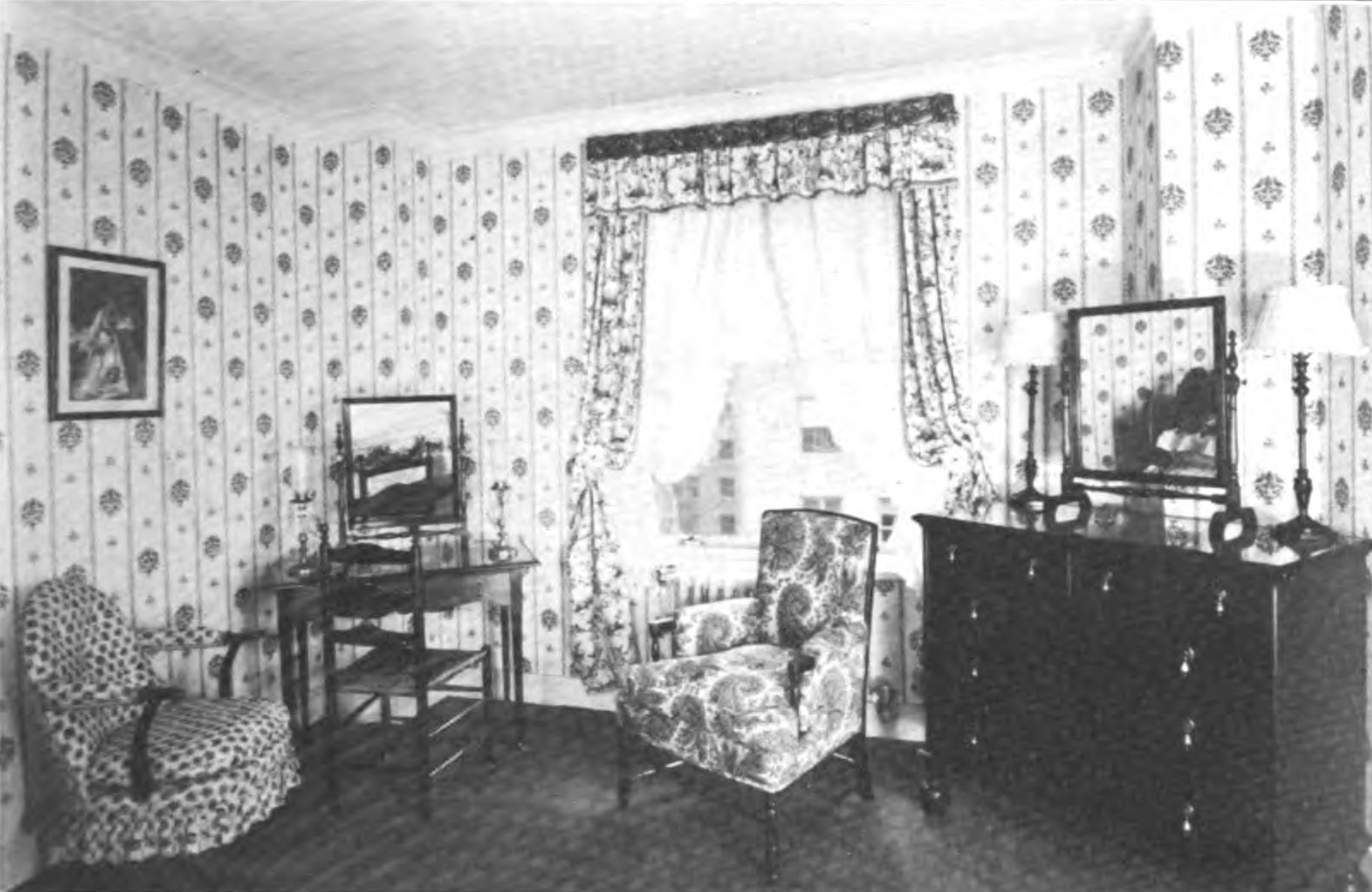
View of a guestroom at the hotel's opening

The Roosevelt Hotel had been planned with 1,107 rooms on the third through 18th stories, which covered a total area of 433,000 square feet (40,200 m^{2}). By the time the hotel closed, it had 1,025 rooms, although other sources cited the hotel as having 1,015 rooms. On each of the guestroom stories, the elevators opened onto a 12-foot-wide (3.7 m) elevator lobby with a floor clerk's desk. Corridors connected the elevator lobby to the guestroom; each corridor measured 6 to 7.5 feet (1.8 to 2.3 m) wide, the standard width of a carpet at the time. Rooms were arranged around the corridors on each story. Each room faced either the street or a light court, while the bathrooms in each room were placed near the corridor. On average, single bedrooms measured 11 by 18 feet (3.4 by 5.5 m), while twin bedrooms measured 12.5 by 18 feet (3.8 by 5.5 m).

Originally, the rooms were decorated with molded wall panels; narrow metal trim, painted to match the tinted walls; and metal doors, finished in mahogany or walnut. The wallpaper, draperies and curtains, mirrors, furniture, and color scheme were all generally designed in the Colonial style. The Lincoln Furniture Company manufactured the original walnut furniture, while Alexander Smith & Sons manufactured the green carpets in each room. Some of the rooms also contained period furniture designed in the Adam style or the William and Mary style. Each bathroom had ceramic tiles and mechanical ventilation, and about half of the guest bathrooms had shower heads; these were all novel features at the time of the hotel's construction. By the 21st century, the rooms were decorated in a style reminiscent of 1920s architecture, with a red, gold, and white palette.

As built, there were a total of four "royal suites" on the topmost stories. Each of these contained a drawing room; a dining room; three bedrooms with their own baths; a dressing room; a maids' room; and a pantry. These royal suites were decorated in the Colonial style, with furniture, wallpaper, four-poster beds, lights, and other furnishings. One of the suites, the Presidential Suite, had four bedrooms, a kitchen, formal living and dining areas, and a wrap-around terrace. This was the only unit in the hotel with a terrace.

== History ==
In the 19th century, New York Central Railroad lines north of Grand Central Depot in Midtown Manhattan were served exclusively by steam locomotives, and the rising traffic soon caused accumulations of smoke and soot in the Park Avenue Tunnel, the only approach to the depot. After a fatal crash in 1902, the New York state legislature passed a law to ban all steam trains in Manhattan by 1908. New York Central's vice president William J. Wilgus proposed electrifying the line and building a new electric-train terminal underground, a plan that was implemented almost in its entirety. The old Grand Central Depot was torn down in phases and replaced by the current Grand Central Terminal. Construction on Grand Central Terminal started in 1903, and the new terminal was opened on February 2, 1913. Passenger traffic on the commuter lines into Grand Central more than doubled in the years following the terminal's completion.

The terminal spurred development in the surrounding area, particularly in Terminal City, a commercial and office district created above where the tracks were covered. Terminal City soon became Manhattan's most desirable commercial and office district. A 1920 New York Times article said, "With its hotels, office buildings, apartments and underground streets it not only is a wonderful railroad terminal, but also a great civic centre." The Roosevelt was one of several hotels developed in Terminal City, along with other hostelries such as the Commodore, the Biltmore, and the Barclay.

=== United Hotels and Roosevelt Hotels Inc. operation ===
==== Construction and opening ====
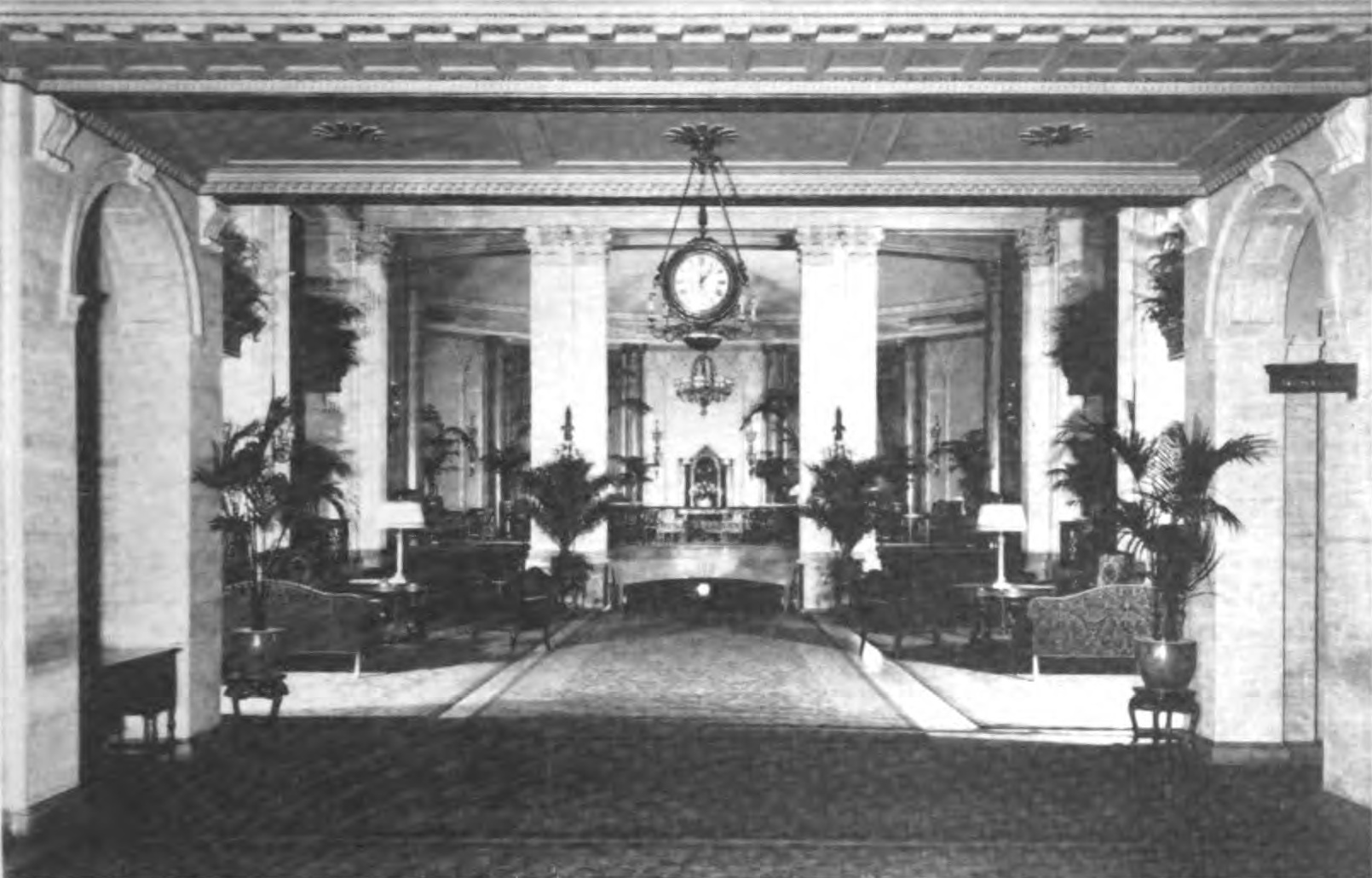
View of main lobby

The New York State Realty and Terminal Company, a division of New York Central, leased the city block bounded by Madison Avenue, 46th Street, Vanderbilt Avenue, and 45th Street to the United Hotels Company of America in June 1922. United Hotels had leased the site for 21 years, with options to renew the lease twice, and was planning a 15-story hotel there. The building alone was projected to cost $8 million, while the land and furnishings were to cost another $10 million. United Hotels announced the next month that the hotel would be named the Roosevelt and that it had awarded a general construction contract to the Thompson–Starrett Company. Niagara Falls businessman Frank A. Dudley oversaw the hotel's development, along with F. W. Rockwell.

The hotel was named for Theodore Roosevelt, the former president of the United States who had died shortly before the hotel was announced. The hotel's operators intended for it to be a tribute to the late president. According to Hotel Monthly magazine, the Roosevelt name was not only intended "to keep away from the gorgeous and extravagant", it also justified why the interior design was patterned after colonial American mansions. The Roosevelt was one of several large buildings developed around Grand Central Terminal in the early 1920s, along with other structures such as the Pershing Square Building and the Bowery Savings Bank Building.

Construction started on November 18, 1922, when workers began demolishing the old Tiffany Studios at Madison Avenue and 45th Street. Workers simultaneously started erecting the hotel's foundations. At the time, the Roosevelt was one of several hotels with over 1,000 rooms that were being developed across the United States. To finance the Roosevelt's construction, in December 1922, United Hotels Company of America subsidiary New York United Hotels Inc. received a $3.5 million loan. Early the following year, New York United Hotels Inc. began issuing gold bonds for the same amount. By early 1923, half of the storefronts had already been leased; the tenants included several women's clothing shops. The Roosevelt Hotel opened on September 22, 1924, with a party attended by 1,500 guests. It had cost $12 million (equivalent to $225,437,000 in 2025) in total. Edward Clinton Fogg was hired as the Roosevelt's first managing director.

==== Early years ====
In December 1925, various members of the Roosevelt family dedicated a plaque in the lobby, honoring Theodore Roosevelt; the plaque depicted a Ding Darling cartoon that had appeared in the New-York Tribune after the former president died. To provide further financing for the Roosevelt, United Hotels issued $5.5 million in debentures in early 1927. Meanwhile, Hugo Gernsback started the radio station WRNY in June 1925 from a room on the Roosevelt's 18th floor. WRNY's transmitter, originally located on the 18th floor, was moved to the roof in 1926. WRNY relocated its transmitter to New Jersey in August 1929, and the radio station moved its studios to 57th Street the next month. United Hotels merged with Bowman-Biltmore Hotels in mid-1929, and John McEntee Bowman took over the Roosevelt's operation.

By 1931, the Roosevelt Hotel had trouble paying rent on the site, and New York United Hotels notified the hotel's bondholders that it would not be able to pay interest on the bonds. This prompted one bondholder to file a lawsuit in the New York Supreme Court in April 1932, claiming that New York United Hotels was insolvent and asking the court to appoint a receiver for the Roosevelt Hotel. New York United Hotels denied the allegations, and a state court dismissed the case because it had been brought by a minority bondholder. Within three months, 95 percent of New York United Hotels' bondholders had agreed to a reorganization plan for the hotel. The remaining bondholders sought a receiver for the hotel, but the New York Supreme Court again denied this petition.

The Delaware Court of Chancery appointed three receivers for the hotel in December 1933, and several men proposed reorganizing New York United Hotels Inc. later the same month. The receivers paid an orchestra $2,500 per week to give daily performances in the grill room. Three minor bondholders filed another bankruptcy petition against the Roosevelt in January 1934, and a federal court approved a plan to reorganize the assets of New York United Hotels Inc.

A corporation called Roosevelt Hotels Inc. offered to buy the hotel for $25,000 in March 1934, saying that New York Central held the hotel's mortgage and that the leasehold was worthless because the hotel's rent was overdue. Despite protests from bondholders, a federal judge approved Roosevelt Hotels Inc.'s bid, as there had not been any other offers for the hotel. Shortly afterward, New York Central agreed to drop its dispossession proceedings against New York United Hotels as part of the reorganization plan. The hotel company would replace all of its common stock, and the railroad would receive $1.3 million in new debentures. Another dining room at the Roosevelt also opened in 1934. Roosevelt Hotels Inc. signed a new lease for the hotel with the New York State Realty and Terminal Company in 1940.

=== Hilton management ===
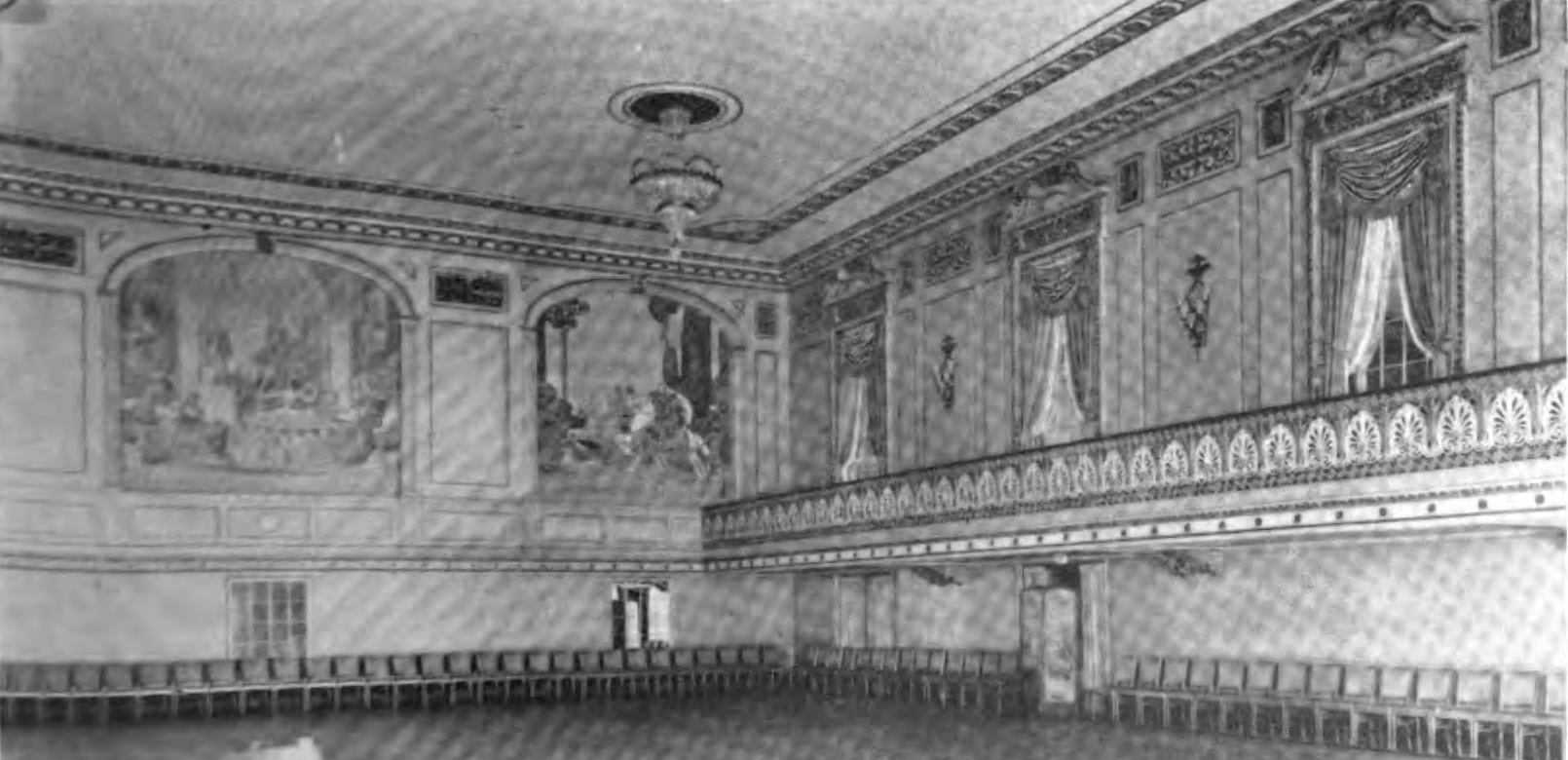
View of Cinderella Ballroom

Hilton Hotels took over management of the Roosevelt in June 1943, when Conrad Hilton bought the majority of the outstanding common stock in Roosevelt Hotel Inc. The Roosevelt became the Hilton chain's first hotel east of Texas, although Conrad Hilton expressed interest in purchasing more hotels in New York City. Simultaneously, New York Central renewed Roosevelt Hotel Inc.'s lease for another 21 years. Conrad Hilton called it "a fine hotel with grand spaces" and made the Roosevelt's Presidential Suite his home. The hotel had a staff shortage by 1945, prompting hotel officials to request that guests make their own beds. In November 1947, the Roosevelt added TV sets to 40 rooms on the seventh through ninth floors, becoming the first hotel in the United States to provide permanent TVs in guestrooms.

Hilton Hotels appointed Frank G. Wangeman as the hotel's general manager in 1951. Wangeman oversaw a $75,000 renovation of the hotel in mid-1952, adding 10,000 square feet (930 m^{2}) by relocating a luncheon club from the 16th floor and consolidating some departments. In addition, the hotel's employee dormitories were converted to guestrooms, as an increasing number of employees had their own residences. The same year, the Realty Luncheon Club of New York moved into a clubhouse next to the Colonial Room. Roosevelt Hotel Inc.'s minority shareholders agreed in October 1952 to sell their stakes to Hilton Hotels, which purchased the hotel outright on December 31, 1952. Edward L. Buckley, who subsequently took over as the Roosevelt's general manager, announced in 1955 that the guestrooms would be renovated for $200,000. Hilton was installing air conditioners in all of the hotel's guestrooms by early 1956.

=== Hotel Corporation of America ownership ===
After Hilton Hotels purchased the Statler Hotels chain in 1954, it owned large hotels in many major cities, including the Roosevelt, the Plaza, the Waldorf-Astoria, the New Yorker, and the Hotel Statler in New York City. Consequently, the federal government filed an antitrust action against Hilton in April 1955. To resolve the suit, Hilton agreed to sell three hotels in February 1956 – the Hotel Jefferson in St. Louis, the Mayflower Hotel in Washington D.C., and either the Roosevelt or the New Yorker in New York. Hilton ultimately sold the Roosevelt to the Hotel Corporation of America (HCA) on February 29, 1956, for $2.13 million. HCA paid $750,000 as a down payment and assumed Hilton's leasehold on the site, which ran through 1964. HCA leased the land from the New Haven Railroad and the New York Central Railroad, the latter of which received most of the income from the site.

When HCA purchased the hotel, workers were still installing air conditioning and televisions. By mid-1956, there was air conditioning in all public areas and 600 guest rooms, and there were televisions in 500 guest rooms. HCA announced plans to renovate the Roosevelt in late 1956, spending $8 million over the next eight years. The first part of the renovation to be completed was the Rib Room, which opened as a luncheon room at the end of that year. In 1962, amid competition from other hotels, the Biltmore, Commodore, and Roosevelt hotels formed an alliance to attract conventions with 1,500 to 5,000 guests. The alliance allowed the three hotels to host a single convention across 4,000 guestrooms, 90 meeting rooms, 15 restaurants, and 50,000 square feet (4,600 m^{2}) of exhibit space.

=== Realty Hotels ownership ===
By early 1964, the trustees of the insolvent New Haven Railroad expressed interest in taking over the hotel and leasing it to Realty Hotels, a holding company jointly run by the New Haven and the New York Central. Realty Hotels took over the hotel from HCA that April. During the 1960s, Realty Hotels replaced about half of the manually operated elevators at the Barclay, Biltmore, Commodore, and Roosevelt, and it renovated these hotels as part of a $22 million modernization program. Realty Hotels' president said the renovations had helped attract new and returning customers to the hotels. The People's Republic of China delegation to the United Nations moved into the hotel's 14th floor in 1971, at which point the hotel's popularity had begun to decline. The next year, the Riese Brothers Organization leased the first-floor dining rooms. The Barclay, Biltmore, Commodore, and Roosevelt began showing in-room movies in 1972. The Roosevelt Grill became the La Difference restaurant in 1977.

The New York Central had experienced financial decline during the 1960s, merging with the Pennsylvania Railroad in 1968 to form the Penn Central Railroad. Penn Central continued to face financial issues and failed to make mortgage payments. By late 1970, the Roosevelt Hotel was facing foreclosure, as were several other buildings that Penn Central owned around Grand Central Terminal. After Penn Central went bankrupt that year, the company sought to sell its properties, including the land below the Roosevelt Hotel. The buildings were placed for auction in October 1971. Penn Central received two bids for the hotel, including a low bid of $9 million from UGP Properties, but both offers were rejected. The proceedings were delayed for several years. Penn Central subsequently withdrew its offer to sell Realty Hotels' properties, including the Roosevelt. Instead, Penn Central spent $4.5 million renovating the Biltmore, Barclay, and Roosevelt hotels in 1976.

=== Milstein ownership and PIA lease ===
In April 1978, Penn Central requested permission from a federal district court to sell the Biltmore, Barclay, and Roosevelt hotels for $45 million to Loews Hotels. A consortium of Middle Eastern investors subsequently offered to buy the hotels for $50 million. Loews raised its offer for the three hotels to $55 million, and a federal judge approved the sale at the beginning of June 1978. Carter B. Horsley wrote that Loews's purchase of the three hotels "may save their future". At the time, the hotel had 1,076 rooms, and Loews was contemplating closing the Roosevelt Hotel and using it as an office building. Instead Loews resold the Biltmore and the Roosevelt to developer Paul Milstein in July 1978 for $30 million, and Milstein began considering converting the two hotels into apartment buildings.

In March 1979, Milstein leased the Roosevelt to Pakistan International Airlines (PIA) through the latter's investment arm PIA Investments Ltd. PIA partnered with Prince Faisal bin Khalid bin Abdulaziz Al Saud in the transaction. The lease cost an estimated $35 million and was to run for 20 years. Prince Faisal and PIA were to pay $2.7 million to $4 million annually in rent, and they also obtained an option to acquire the hotel after 20 years at a set price of $36.5 million. The hotel's Colonial Room was destroyed during a fire in July 1980. Turner Construction renovated the hotel's interior in the late 1980s. Soon afterward, during the early 1990s recession in the United States, the Roosevelt began advertising to large associations and group conventions, which paid more than weekend visitors and tourists did. In addition, a mosque was founded within the Roosevelt's basement in the 1990s; The New York Times reported in 1998 that the mosque attracted hundreds of congregants each week.

During the first sixteen years of PIA's lease, the hotel lost $70 million worth of business because its facilities were outdated. As a result, PIA closed the hotel for an extensive renovation on July 1, 1995, and the hotel building was temporarily covered in scaffolding. PIA planned to rebrand the hotel as the Radisson Roosevelt. The hotel had 1,031 rooms at the time of its closure, but PIA expanded the capacity slightly to 1,040 rooms. During the renovation, various decorations were taken out of storage and reinstalled, and parts of the hotel were retrofitted to accommodate disabled guests. The Roosevelt Hotel was one of several hotels in midtown Manhattan that were renovated in the 1990s. Though the project was initially planned to be completed in mid-1996 at a cost of $55 million, it ultimately cost $65 million (equivalent to $100,927,000 in 2025). The Roosevelt's operators began hiring employees in early 1997, receiving thousands of job applications for 700 positions. When the hotel reopened in June, some of the public rooms were still undergoing renovations.

=== PIA ownership ===
==== 1990s to 2010s ====
After the renovation was completed, the Roosevelt again became profitable; by 2000, the hotel had an 84.8 percent occupancy rate and was earning $29 million annually. PIA exercised its option to purchase the hotel for $36.5 million in 1999, under the terms of its lease. By then, the Milstein family claimed that the hotel's value had increased to $250 million, and a legal battle resulted. The Milsteins agreed to sell the hotel only if PIA paid off a mortgage loan that the Milsteins had taken out on the hotel; this added $23 million to the $36.5 million sale price, for a total of $59.5 million. After New York state judge Ira Gammerman ruled in PIA's favor in 2000, the Milsteins were required to adhere to the 1979 agreement and repay PIA and Prince Faisal the additional $23 million. By 2002, the hotel's occupancy rate had declined to 75 percent, and its annual profits had decreased to $12 million.

PIA announced in February 2003 that it would place the hotel for sale. The airline wanted to sell the Roosevelt along with the Hôtel Scribe in Paris, but PIA delayed the sale by several months because of the Iraq War. Several developers, including Donald Trump, Harry Macklowe, The Related Companies, and Vornado Realty Trust, expressed interest in buying the Roosevelt. Pakistani president Pervez Musharraf indicated later that year that the sale might be delayed. At the time, there were rumors that the Roosevelt might be converted into an office building. Instead of selling the building, PIA spent around $3 million on relatively minor renovations. By the mid-2000s, there was increasing demand for the hotel's exhibition space. In 2005, PIA bought out most of its Saudi partner's stake in the Roosevelt and the Scribe, in exchange for $40 million and PIA's share of the Riyadh Minhal Hotel (a Holiday Inn located on property owned by the prince). After this transaction, Prince Faisal owned 1 percent of the hotel, while PIA owned 99 percent.

PIA announced in July 2007 that it was putting the hotel up for sale once again, although several members of the Pakistan Senate opposed the sale. At the time, the airline had recorded a loss of $96 million during the first nine months of that year. Ultimately, the increasing profitability of the hotel resulted in the sale being abandoned in late 2007. By the following year, amid a decline in guests caused by the 2008 financial crisis, the Roosevelt's managers started offering discounted room rates. The hotel's managers also added a bar on the 19th floor, known as Mad46, in 2008. The next year, an indoor lounge was added to the hotel's bar. By early 2010, Pakistani politicians were again contemplating placing the Roosevelt Hotel for sale. Instead, the Roosevelt underwent an $8.2 million renovation in 2011; the project included refurnishing each of the 1,015 units and the Madison Club Lounge. By then, The Wall Street Journal described the Roosevelt as "a midprice destination for tourists and industry conference organizers".

After East Midtown was rezoned in 2014, city officials said a skyscraper could be developed on the site of the Roosevelt Hotel, although PIA had not proposed a new building there. PIA proposed selling the Roosevelt yet again in 2017 as part of a plan to raise $3.5 billion. Venture capitalist Shahal M. Khan expressed interest in buying the hotel, telling The Real Deal magazine that he planned to offer at least $500 million. Pakistani prime minister Shahid Khaqan Abbasi rejected PIA's attempt to sell the hotel in December 2017. Early the next year, PIA officials indicated that they were considering leasing out the hotel for three or four decades. PIA refinanced the Roosevelt in 2018, obtaining a $105 million mortgage loan from JPMorgan Chase.

==== Closure ====
With the onset of the COVID-19 pandemic in New York City in March 2020, most of the hotel's employees were furloughed, and occupancy rates dropped significantly. By that July, officials of the Aviation Division of Pakistan indicated that the hotel might have to be closed permanently that December, as the hotel was losing $37 million per year. The same month, Pakistan's Cabinet Committee on Privatization decided to run the hotel through a joint venture rather than privatizing it. Trump, who at that time was U.S. president, subsequently expressed interest in buying the hotel from PIA. In September, Pakistan's Economic Coordination Council gave $142 million to the Roosevelt Hotel Corporation to settle outstanding debts and pay severance to employees. The next month, PIA announced that the hotel would permanently close due to continued financial losses associated with the pandemic. At the time, nearly three-quarters of New York City's luxury hotels had not reopened.

The hotel closed on December 18, 2020. The Pakistani Air Ministry refused to divulge its plans for the Roosevelt, which was boarded up, although the ministry said it was not planning to sell the hotel. One year after the Roosevelt closed, PIA had still not paid $7 million in severance to the hotel's workers, as was required by New York City law. This prompted the Hotel Trades Council to file a lawsuit against the New York City government, claiming that the city had failed to enforce the law. By November 2021, PIA was paying severance to roughly 500 workers that had been furloughed. However, the airline was seeking an injunction against another city law, which required hotels with more than 100 rooms to pay each employee up to $500 per week while they were closed. The following April, a federal judge denied PIA's request for an injunction.

By early 2022, Australian mining firm Tethyan Copper sought to acquire the hotel after the Pakistani government reneged on a mineral-rights agreement with them. In addition, local politicians were advocating for the New York City Landmarks Preservation Commission to designate the hotel building as a landmark. The Qatar Investment Authority also showed interest in purchasing the hotel in August, offering to buy a 25 percent stake. At the time, Pakistan's aviation minister Ghulam Sarwar Khan denied reports that PIA was planning to sell some shares in the hotel to Qatar. By that September, Pakistani officials were considering either reopening the hotel or leasing it out as a mixed-use development. Pakistani officials indicated in early 2023 that they would not sell the hotel but, instead, planned to form a joint venture to operate the hotel. The hotel's future was still uncertain because PIA and Tethyan were still involved in a lawsuit over the hotel.

==== Use as shelter ====
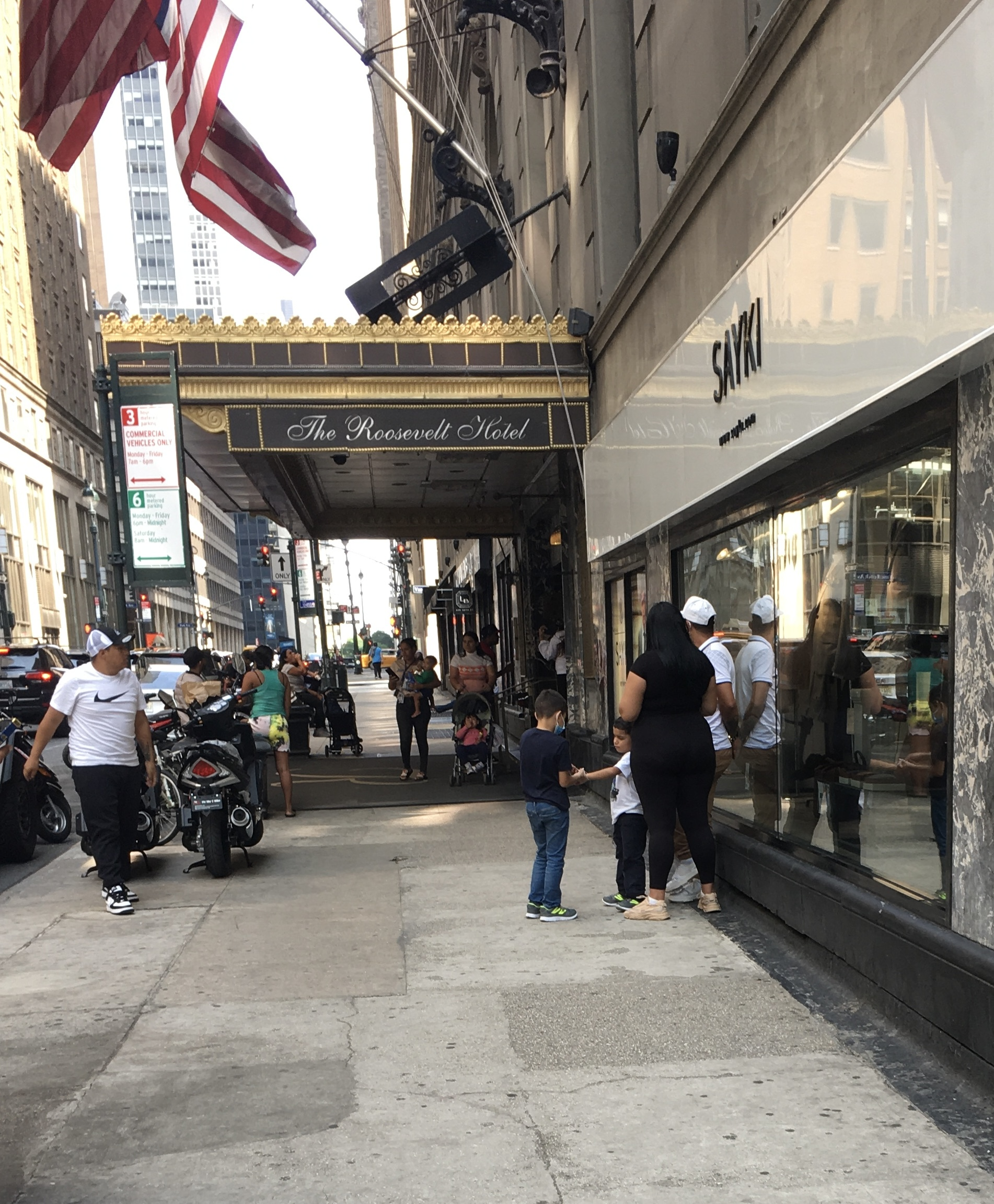
Roosevelt Hotel with some migrant asylum seekers outside it, June 2023

News sources reported in May 2023 that the New York City government was planning to use the hotel as temporary migrant housing, amid a sharp increase in the number of asylum seekers traveling to the city. The Pakistani cabinet gave its approval for the deal shortly thereafter, and signed a 3-year contract. The hotel, the city's ninth Humanitarian Emergency Response and Relief Center, was operated by DocGo. A welcome center opened at the hotel on May 15 of that year, along with the first 175 rooms in the shelter, which was ultimately supposed to contain 850 rooms. The lobby was converted into an "arrival center", where medical workers, case workers, and translators assisted migrants. The Hotel and Gaming Trades Council labor union, which represents Roosevelt Hotel employees, negotiated a settlement to reopen the Roosevelt Hotel. Within three months of the processing center's opening, so many asylum seekers had gone to the hotel that some migrants had to sleep on the sidewalk while waiting for a room.

By late 2023, the hotel processed 300 to 500 migrants a day and was home to about 3,000 migrants. Pakistani officials reviewed four proposals for the redevelopment of the Roosevelt Hotel in September 2023, and they selected Jones Lang LaSalle in February 2024 as the site's real estate brokerage. By April 2024, the migrant intake center had served 130,000 people. Following the reelection of Donald Trump as U.S. president in 2024, members of his administration expressed concerns that gang members and criminals were being housed at the hotel, citing several violent incidents there. Local residents also raised concerns about quality of life issues regarding the hotel's migrants.

Adams announced in February 2025 that the shelter would close in June, and most of the employees were laid off the next month. The shelter's closure negatively impacted the Pakistani government's finances and prompted reports that the hotel site could be redeveloped or sold. Burkhan World Investments, led by Shahal M. Khan, was among the developers who made an offer for the building. The shelter closed June 24, 2025, having accommodated over 155,000 people from 150 countries. The New York Times wrote that the hotel required extensive renovations before it could be converted back to a hotel or some other use. That July, the Pakistani government considered selling its stake in the hotel, tentatively valuing the property at $1 billion or more. Jones Lang LaSalle quit as the hotel's adviser the same month, citing conflicts of interest. In February 2026, the Pakistani and U.S. governments tentatively agreed to allow redevelopment of the hotel site.

== Notable guests and events ==
In its first five years, the hotel hosted such events as music recitals; national singing auditions; the National Association of Manufacturers' annual meetings; an annual exhibit by car company Packard; and a benefit for the Authors League. The hotel's events in the 1930s included luncheons for athletes, as well as a pet show sponsored by the New York Women's League for Animals. By the mid-20th century, the Roosevelt was hosting events such as National Federation of Music Clubs meetings, coin exhibits, dog shows, and tennis conferences. Over the years, the Roosevelt has also hosted city real estate auctions, where the New York City government sold off properties that it had acquired through foreclosure.

The Roosevelt has hosted several awards ceremonies. For instance, at least during the 1940s, the Peabody Awards for radio and television were hosted at the Roosevelt. Columbia University hosted its first Mike Berger Awards in Journalism at the hotel in 1961, and the George Polk Memorial Award was being distributed at the Roosevelt by the 1970s. The Roosevelt also hosted the National Football League Draft between 1976 and 1978, when the NFL Draft was still a relatively low-profile event.

=== Grill Room music ===
Guy Lombardo began leading the house band of the Roosevelt Grill in 1929. Lombardo held an annual New Year's Eve radio broadcast at the hotel with his band, the Royal Canadians; this tradition gave rise to the popularity of "Auld Lang Syne" during New Year's Eve. Lombardo's band typically performed in the Grill during the winter, while the Grill was closed during the summer (typically in May). The Grill was open year-round by the early 1940s, and the Royal Canadians' program was also broadcast on television starting in 1943. Lombardo performed at the Grill every year until 1962, except during 1959. According to The New York Times, many Major League Baseball teams visited the Grill during Lombardo's time at the Grill. Lawrence Welk began his career at the Roosevelt Hotel while performing with the Royal Canadians.

Jan Garber's band started playing in the Grill in 1962. The Grill Room was briefly closed from December 1964 to January 1965, when an all-female orchestra led by Joan Fairfax began performing there. Other performers included jazz musician Si Zentner, who appeared at the Grill Room in 1961.

=== Republican Party use ===
During the mid-20th century, several Republican Party candidates and campaigns used the Roosevelt Hotel. For example, the National Republican Congressional Committee opened an office at the hotel in 1930, and Fiorello La Guardia operated a campaign office at the Roosevelt during the 1941 New York City mayoral election. The hotel also contained the national campaign offices of numerous Republican U.S. presidential candidates. Between 1943 and 1954, the New York state government maintained an office at the Roosevelt Hotel for Governor Thomas E. Dewey, who occupied suites 1525 through 1531 at the Roosevelt. Dewey's campaign for the 1944 United States presidential election was headquartered on the 10th floor, and Dewey, his family, and his staff listened to election returns from his 15th-floor suite during the 1948 presidential election. Although Dewey retired as New York's governor in 1954, he continued to visit the Roosevelt's barbershop every Tuesday until he died.

The hotel housed Dwight D. Eisenhower's New York campaign offices during the 1952 presidential election. In addition, John Lindsay had an office at the Roosevelt in 1958, during his candidacy for the House of Representatives; when Lindsay won the 1965 New York City mayoral election, his staffers celebrated in the Roosevelt's ballroom. By the early 1970s, Republican politicians no longer frequented the Roosevelt. Even so, the New York County Republican Committee was headquartered within Dewey's former suites in 1971, remaining there until at least the 1980s.

=== Use as filming location ===
The Roosevelt Hotel has appeared in several films and TV shows. A scene from the 1987 drama film Wall Street was shot inside the ballroom. The films Boiler Room, Monday Night Mayhem, Hoax, 1408, Hanky Panky, French Connection, and Quiz Show, as well as Presumed Innocent, Malcolm X, and Maid in Manhattan, were also partially filmed in the hotel. In addition, the majority of the 2012 film Man on a Ledge was shot on the Roosevelt's roof; a replica of a hotel room had to be hoisted to the roof during filming. The television series The Bachelor was shot at the Roosevelt Hotel. The hotel also frequently appeared in the TV series Mad Men; according to The New York Times, "executives and secretaries [met] for midday romps" in the series. In 2012, to celebrate the series' fifth season, the Roosevelt began selling Mad Men-themed vacation packages.

== Critical reception ==
In the 2000s, a critic for New York magazine wrote of the hotel: "Still, the highlight of the Roosevelt remains the architecture itself." Another critic, writing for Gothamist, said that the lobby "has managed to keep its grandeur. There are chandeliers, massive vases filled with flowers, a grand piano, and detailing you only really see in old architecture—Hilton called it, 'a fine hotel with grand spaces'." After the hotel's bar appeared in season 1, episode 8, of Mad Men, one newspaper described the Roosevelt's bar as "just as cozy and sombre as a place dedicated to illicitness should be". After the Roosevelt became a migrant shelter in 2023, The New York Times described it as "the new Ellis Island" and "a symbol of the huge scale of the migrant crisis and a faltering government response."

== See also ==
- List of former hotels in Manhattan

Preceded by New York Hilton Midtown	Venues of the NFL draft 1976–1978	Succeeded by Waldorf Astoria New York
