= Fenn Tower =

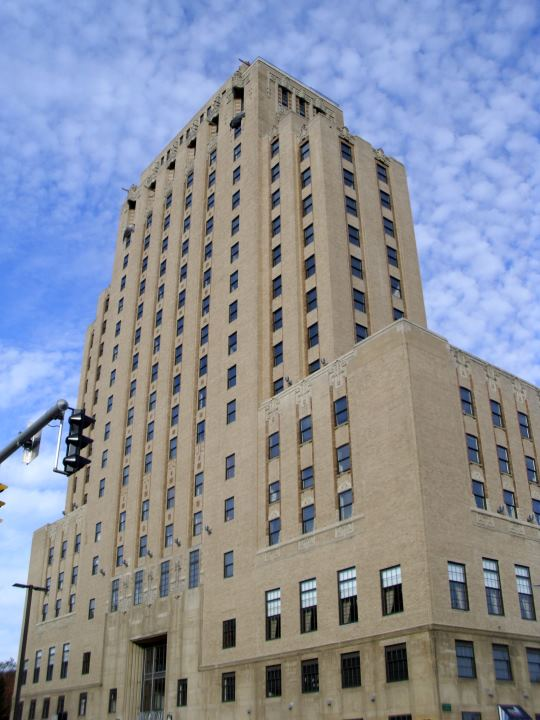
- Fenn Tower on Cleveland State's main campus
- Interactive map of the Fenn Tower area

General information
- Type: Student Housing
- Location: 1983 East 24th Street; 2401 Euclid Avenue; Cleveland, Ohio, USA
- Construction started: November 3, 1929
- Completed: 1929
- Opening: 1930
- Cost: $1.5 million
- Owner: Cleveland State University

Height
- Roof: 81 m (266 ft)
- Top floor: 21

Technical details
- Floor count: 22
- Lifts/elevators: 5

Design and construction
- Architect: George B. Post & Sons
- Main contractor: Thompson-Starrett Company
- National Town and Country Club
- U.S. National Register of Historic Places
- Location within Cleveland Location within Ohio Location within the United States
- Location: 2401 Euclid Ave., Cleveland, Ohio
- Coordinates: 41°30′8″N 81°40′20″W
- Area: less than one acre
- Built: 1930
- Built by: Thompson-Starrett Co.
- Architect: George B. Post and Sons
- Architectural style: Art Deco
- NRHP reference No.: 03001102
- Added to NRHP: October 30, 2003

Fenn Tower is a 22-story skyscraper in Cleveland, Ohio. It is owned by Cleveland State University. It was built for the National Town and Country Club, but was only used for one event before closing. It was originally known as the National Town and Country Club before being sold. It was purchased by Fenn College in 1937 for $250,000. It is currently being used as student housing. It is the second tallest structure on the Cleveland State campus, second to Rhodes Tower. The tower was named after Sereno Peck Fenn (one of three principal founders of Sherwin-Williams), whom Fenn College was named after. Fenn Tower is listed on the National Register of Historic Places as the National Town and Country Club. It was originally furnished by Rorimer-Brooks Studios, Inc. Originally where the Fenn Gym and The Ellwood H. Fisher Swimming Pool were located, they were removed during the 2005 renovation.

== History ==
Fenn started by offering night classes in the 1930s in engineering and its model was to specialize in low cost higher education. Fenn's first president was Dr. Cecil V. Thomas who was a well known academician and Ohio educator. In 1932, Fenn added business classes to the growing roster of student programs. The National Town and Country Club Building was supposed to house the gentleman's club for Greater Clevelanders who wanted a central location in which to hold club meetings and events. However, due to the stock market crash in 1929, the club was no longer solvent and the high rise building lay vacant until purchased by Fenn College in 1937 because of Fenn's need for more space. This meant that Fenn was only the third college in the United States to have a skyscraper on its academic campus (the others being the University of Pittsburgh and Thomas Jefferson University in Philadelphia) and further gave Fenn a much more coveted Euclid Avenue downtown address.

== See also ==
- Cleveland State University
- List of tallest buildings in Cleveland
