= George B. Post =

American architect (1837–1915)

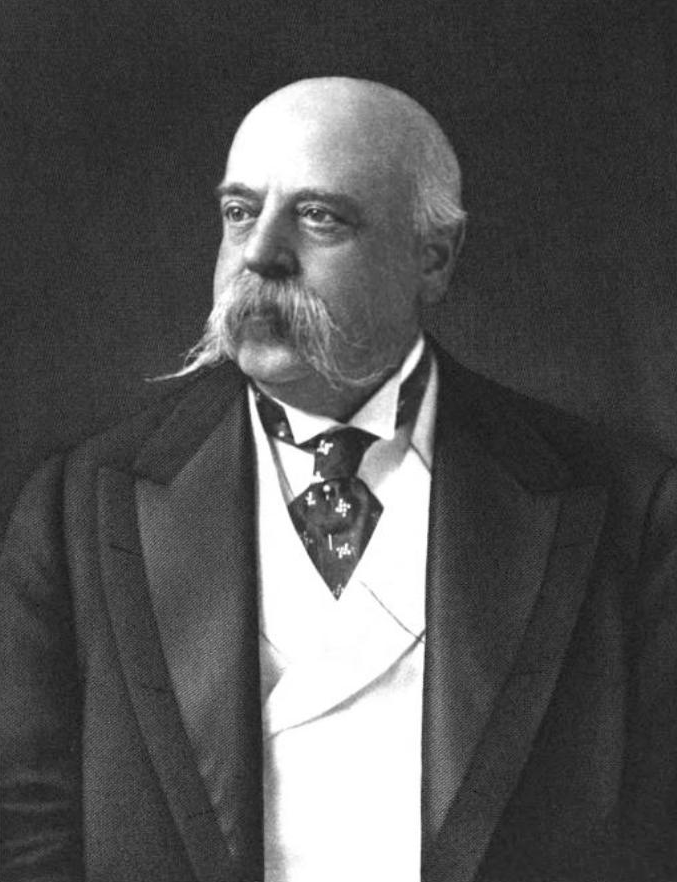

6th President of the American Institute of Architects
- In office 1896–1898
- Preceded by: Daniel H. Burnham
- Succeeded by: Henry Van Brunt

Personal details
- Born: December 15, 1837 Manhattan, New York, US
- Died: November 28, 1913 (aged 75) Bernardsville, New Jersey, US
- Spouse: Alice Matilda Stone
- Children: James Otis Post, William Stone Post
- Education: New York University
- Occupation: Architect

George Browne Post (December 15, 1837 – November 28, 1913) was an American architect trained in the Beaux-Arts tradition. Active from 1869 almost until his death, he was recognized as a master of several contemporary American architectural genres, and played a role in the birth of the skyscraper. He was President of the American Institute of Architects from 1896 to 1898.

Many of his most characteristic projects were for commercial buildings where new requirements pushed the traditional boundaries of design. Many of the buildings he designed have been demolished, since their central locations in New York and other cities made them vulnerable to rebuilding in the twentieth century. Some of his lost buildings were regarded as landmarks of their era. His sons, who had been taken into the firm in 1904, continued after his death as George B. Post and Sons until 1930.

== Early life and education ==
Post was born on December 15, 1837, in Manhattan, New York, to Joel Browne Post and Abby Mauran Church. He attended New York University, where he graduated in 1858 with a degree in civil engineering, Post became a student of Richard Morris Hunt from 1858 to 1860. In 1860, he formed a partnership with a fellow student in Hunt's office, Charles D. Gambrill, with a brief hiatus for service in the American Civil War.

== Career ==
=== Military service ===
Post served in the American Civil War under General Burnside at the Battle of Fredericksburg and later rose to the rank of colonel in the New York National Guard.

=== Architect ===
In 1867, Post founded his own architectural firm, which expanded in 1904 when two of his sons, James Otis Post and William Stone Post, joined him to form George B. Post and Sons.

Post served as the sixth president of the American Institute of Architects from 1896 to 1899. He also trained architect Arthur Bates Jennings.

Post designed many of the prominent private homes in various places, with many concentrated in New York City and Bernardsville, NJ. He also designed many prominent commercial and public buildings.

A true member of the American Renaissance, Post engaged notable artists and artisans to add decorative sculpture and murals to his architectural designs. Among those who worked with Post were the sculptor Karl Bitter and painter Elihu Vedder. Post was a founding member of the National Arts Club, serving as the club's inaugural president from 1898 to 1905. In 1905, his two sons were taken into the partnership, and they continued to lead the firm after Post's death, notably as the designers of many Statler Hotels in cities across the United States. From that time forward, the firm carried on under the stewardship of Post's grandson, Edward Everett Post (1904–2006) until the late twentieth century.

Sarah Landau's publication George B. Post, Architect: Picturesque Designer and Determined Realist (1998) inspired a retrospective exhibition in 1998–99 to revisit Post's work at the Society. In 2014, curator, architect George Ranalli presented an exhibition of Post's drawings and photographs of the design of the City College of New York's main campus buildings, on loan from the New-York Historical Society.

Post received the AIA Gold Medal in 1911. His extensive archive is in the collection at the New-York Historical Society.

==== Private residences ====
The Cornelius Vanderbilt II House, which Post designed in partnership with Richard Morris Hunt, was an English Jacobethan Gothic red-brick and limestone chateau that stood at the corner of East 57th Street and Fifth Avenue and was one of the most opulent single-family homes of its time. It featured a lavishly scrolled cast-iron gate forged in Paris (now in Central Park), sculptural reliefs by Karl Bitter (now in the Sherry-Netherland Hotel), an ornate reddish-brown marble fireplace sculpted by Augustus Saint-Gaudens (now in the Metropolitan Museum of Art), and elaborate interior decoration by Frederick Kaldenberg, John LaFarge, Philip Martiny, Frederick W. MacMonnies, Rene de Quelin, and Augustus Saint-Gaudens and his brother Julius. The mansion was razed in 1927 for the construction of the Bergdorf Goodman Building at 754 Fifth Avenue. The mansion was photographed by Albert Levy while being built.

Post also designed the palazzo across the street that faced the Vanderbilt Mansion for Collis P. Huntington (1889–94). In Newport, Rhode Island, he built a home for the president of the Louisville and Nashville Railroad, C.C. Baldwin, "Chateau-Nooga" or the Baldwin Cottage (1879–80), a polychromatic exercise in the "Quaint Style" with bargeboards and half-timbering; John La Farge provided stained glass panels.

Post also designed many of the gilded-age mansions found in Bernardsville, NJ, and was credited more than anyone with selling wealthy New Yorkers on the idea of establishing a country home in the Somerset Hills. He designed Kenilwood—a grand home built in 1896–1897 as a wedding gift for his son—and an excellent residential example of Gothic Revival architecture in America. Kenilwood remained in the Post family until it was purchased by Mike Tyson in 1988.

==== Public buildings ====
Post also designed more staid public and semi-public structures, including the New York Stock Exchange Building, the New York Times Building, the Bronx Borough Hall, and the Wisconsin State Capitol.

In 1893, Post was named to the architectural staff of the World's Columbian Exposition in Chicago, Illinois, by Burnham and Root, where he designed the Manufactures and Liberal Arts Building.

In 1894, Post, along with J. Herbert Ballantine, Robert L. Stevens, and Edward T. H. Talmadge each pledged $8,000 to purchase land in Bernardsville, New Jersey, to establish the Somerset Hills Country Club, which, after being built on the banks of Ravine Lake was relocated in 1917 to its present site and includes a golf course designed by A.W. Tillinghast.

Many of Post's designs were landmarks of the era. Post's Equitable Life Building (1868–70) was the first office building designed to use passenger elevators; Post himself leased the upper floors when contemporaries predicted they could not be rented. His Western Union Telegraph Building (1872–75) at Dey Street in Lower Manhattan was the first office building to rise as high as ten stories, a forerunner of skyscrapers to come. Post's twenty-story New York World Building (1889–90) was the tallest building in New York City when it was erected in "Newspaper Row" facing City Hall Park.

== Personal life ==
Post married Alice Matilda Stone (1840–1909) on October 14, 1863. Together, they had five children: George Browne Post Jr., William Stone Post, Allison Wright Post, James Otis Post, and Alice Winifred Post.

Post died on November 28, 1913, in Bernardsville, New Jersey. He was interred at Woodlawn Cemetery in the Bronx, New York City.

== Partial list of works ==
- Kenilwood, Bernardsville, NJ. An excellent residential example of Gothic Revival architecture in the United States.
- High Bridge Reformed Church, High Bridge, New Jersey, 1869
- Equitable Life Building (New York City), 1868–1870, razed 1912.
- Bonner-Marquand Gymnasium, Princeton University, Princeton, New Jersey, 1869–1870, razed in 1907.
- Williamsburgh Savings Bank Building (175 Broadway), Brooklyn, New York, 1870–1875
- Troy Savings Bank, Troy, New York, 1875.
- Western Union Telegraph Building, New York City, 1875. Often dubbed "the first skyscraper in New York City, this 10-story headquarters for Western Union featured a clock tower. The building was razed in 1914 for the AT&T headquarters at 195 Broadway.
- Claremont, Bernardsville, New Jersey, 1907. George Post's home in the Somerset Hills. As of October 2020, for sale for $10 million.
- Chickering Hall, New York City, c.1877. Built as the headquarters of the Chickering Piano Company, this four-story building faced in brick with brownstone and gray marble trim featured a 1,450-seat auditorium that hosted lectures by Thomas H. Huxley and Oscar Wilde and was the site of Alexander Graham Bell's first interstate telephone call to New Brunswick, New Jersey, in 1877. Razed.
- New York Hospital (razed), 1877, notable for its use of large ground-level windows for better natural illumination of the interior.
- Library and Lyceum, Morristown, New Jersey. 1878, Razed.
- Brooklyn Historical Society, Brooklyn, New York, 1878–1880, Romanesque revival building employing architectural terracotta, originally named Long Island Historical Society.
- Post Building, New York City, 1880–81. A deep central recess provided light and air to the interiors, a feature that quickly became standard for large commercial structures.
- Mills Building, New York City, 1881–1883, called "the first modern office building", on a two-story base, the upper eight floors reached by ten elevators, it used architectural terracotta panels, which Post had helped to introduce to the United States, and eliminated the conventional mansard roofline. Razed.
- New York Produce Exchange (1881–84) at 2 Broadway faced Bowling Green. Built 1881–1885; Razed 1958.
- Cornelius Vanderbilt Mansion, New York City, 1882, renovated and enlarged 1893, Razed 1927.
- New York Cotton Exchange (razed), New York City, 1883–1885
- Mortimer Building (razed), New York City, 1885
- New York World Building, or Pulitzer Building, New York City, at the time of its completion, the tallest building in the world, 1889–1890, Razed.
- New York Times Building (41 Park Row), New York City, 1888–89
- Union Trust Building (razed), 78–82 Broadway, New York City, 1889–1890
- Prudential Headquarters (4 buildings), Newark, New Jersey, 1892–1911. Razed in 1956.
- Manufacturer's and Liberal Arts Building, World's Columbian Exposition, Chicago, Illinois, 1893. Razed after the exposition concluded.
- Erie County Savings Bank building, Buffalo, New York, 1893, in Romanesque Revival. Razed in 1968.
- Park Building, Pittsburgh, Pennsylvania, 1896, remodeled in the 1960s
- Bronx Borough Hall, New York City, 1897, Razed.
- St. Paul Building, New York City, 1898. Razed.
- New York Stock Exchange Building, New York City, 1901–1903
- City College of New York Campus, New York City, 1903–1907, in Gothic Revival style
- Old Montreal Stock Exchange Building, Montreal, Quebec, 1904.
- Mutual Benefit Life Insurance Company, Newark, New Jersey, 1904–08 (razed)
- Wisconsin State Capitol, Madison, Wisconsin, 1906
- Cleveland Trust Company Building, Euclid Avenue, Cleveland, Ohio, 1908
- Pontiac Hotel, Oswego, New York, 1912

== See also ==
- Stockton B. Colt
