= Parker =

Parker may refer to:

== People ==
- Parker (given name), including a list of people and fictional characters with the given name
- Parker (surname), including a list of people and fictional characters with the surname
  - Justice Parker (disambiguation), judges/justices named Parker

== Arts and entertainment ==
- Parker (1984 film), a British crime film
- Parker (Stark novels character), the main character in the Parker novel series by Richard Stark
- Parker (2013 film), an American action thriller
- "Parker", a 2007 song by Psapp from The Camel's Back
- Parker, a player of park golf

== Businesses and organizations ==
- Parker Brothers, former toy and game manufacturer
- Parker Bros., former American firearms firm
- Parker Guitars, American manufacturer of guitars
- Parker Hannifin, manufacturer of motion and control technologies
- Parker Manufacturing Company, tool and kitchen cabinet manufacturer, and industrial landlord
- Parker Pen Company, American pen maker

== Places ==
- Parker, Arizona
- Parker, Colorado
- Parker, Florida
- Parker, Idaho
- Parker, Kansas
- Parker, Missouri
- Parker, North Carolina
- Parker, Pennsylvania
- Parker, South Carolina
- Parker, South Dakota
- Parker, Texas in Collin County
- Parker, Johnson County, Texas
- Parker, Washington
- Parker City, Indiana
- Parker County, Texas
- Parker Dam, across the Colorado River
- Parker Strip, Arizona
- Parker Township, Marshall County, Minnesota
- Parker Township, Morrison County, Minnesota
- Parker Township, Pennsylvania

== Schools ==
- George S. Parker High School, Janesville, Wisconsin, U.S.
- Francis Parker (disambiguation)#Schools, the name of several schools
- Parker Academy, Concord, New Hampshire, U.S.
- Parker School (Kamuela, Hawaii), U.S.
- Lower Parker School, Salem, Missouri, U.S.

== Other uses ==
- ARA Parker, two ships of the Argentine Navy
- HMS Parker (1916), a ship
- Parker Solar Probe, a 2018 spacecraft
- Mount Melibengoy, formerly known as Parker Volcano, Mindanao island, Philippines

== See also ==
- Parkers (disambiguation)
- Parker Building (disambiguation)
- Perker (disambiguation)
- Parka, a type of hooded anorak
- Fort Parker massacre, at Parker's Fort, Texas
- Parker Center, a former police building in Los Angeles
- Parker and Lee, former American public relations firm
- Parker immunity doctrine, a principle in American antitrust law
  - Parker v. Brown, a United States Supreme Court decision
- Parker Morris Committee and the Parker Morris Standards, in British housing policy
- Parker truss, type of bridge design
