= New York Stock Exchange Building =

Building in Manhattan, New York

- New York Stock Exchange
- U.S. National Register of Historic Places
- U.S. National Historic Landmark
- U.S. Historic district – Contributing property
- New York State Register of Historic Places
- New York City Landmark
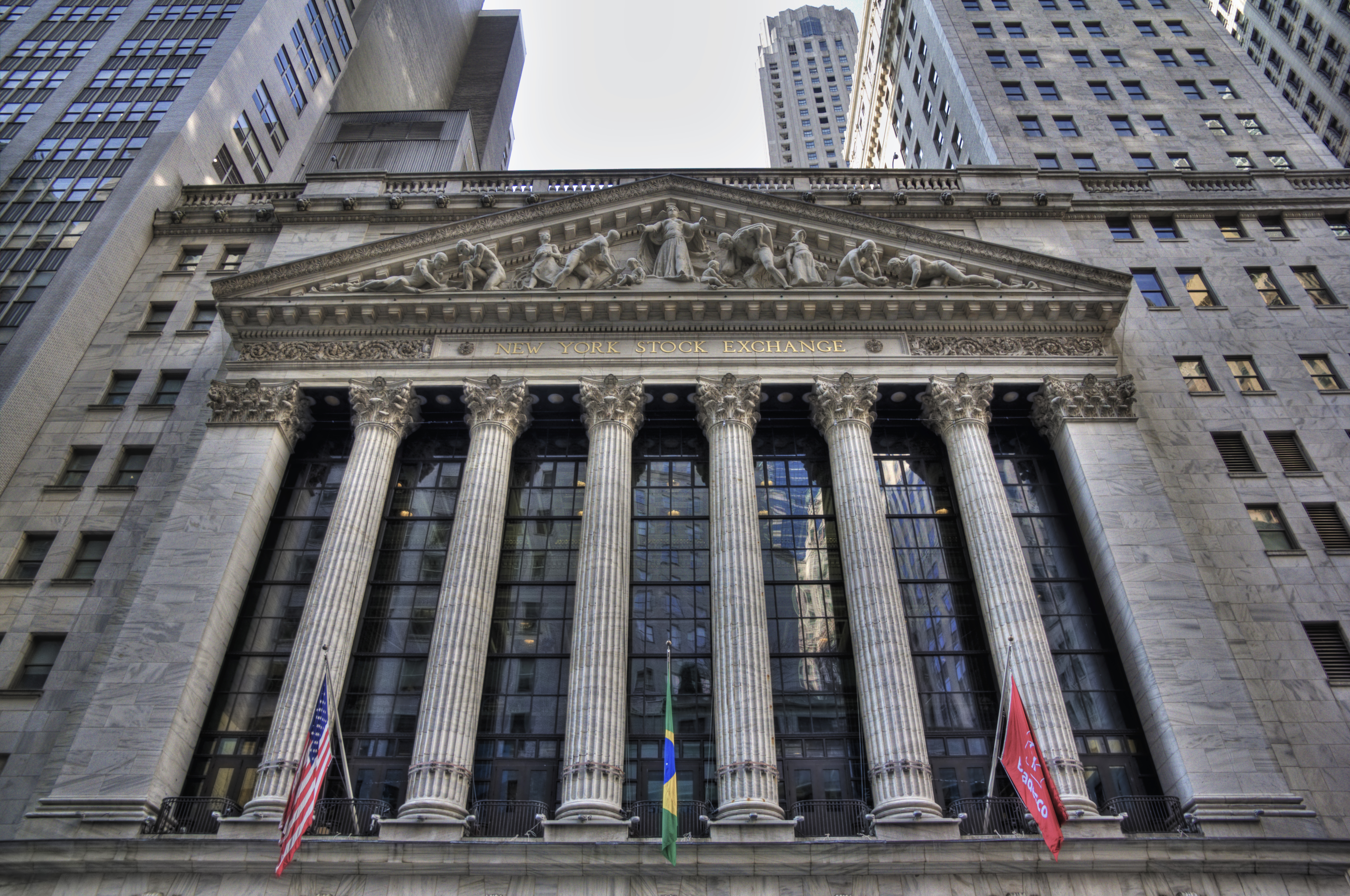
- Main facade of the building's southern section in 2012
- Interactive map of New York Stock Exchange
- Location: 18 Broad Street; Manhattan, New York
- Coordinates: 40°42′25″N 74°00′40″W
- Built: 1903
- Architects: Trowbridge & Livingston; George B. Post; William Stone Post
- Architectural style: Classical Revival
- Part of: Wall Street Historic District (ID07000063)
- NRHP reference No.: 78001877
- NYSRHP No.: 06101.000373
- NYCL No.: 1529

Significant dates
- Added to NRHP: June 2, 1978
- Designated NHL: June 2, 1978
- Designated CP: February 20, 2007
- Designated NYSRHP: June 23, 1980
- Designated NYCL: July 9, 1985

The New York Stock Exchange Building (also NYSE Building) is the headquarters of the New York Stock Exchange (NYSE), located in the Financial District of Lower Manhattan in New York City. It is composed of two connected structures occupying much of the city block bounded by Wall Street, Broad Street, New Street, and Exchange Place. The central section of the block contains the original structure at 18 Broad Street, designed in the Classical Revival style by George B. Post. The northern section contains a 23-story office annex at 11 Wall Street, designed by Trowbridge & Livingston in a similar style.

The marble facade of 18 Broad Street contains colonnades facing east toward Broad Street and west toward New Street, both atop two-story podiums. The Broad Street colonnade, an icon of the NYSE, contains a pediment designed by John Quincy Adams Ward and Paul Wayland Bartlett, depicting commerce and industry. The facade of 11 Wall Street is simpler in design but contains architectural details similar to those at 18 Broad Street. Behind the colonnades at 18 Broad Street is the main trading floor, a 72-foot-tall (22 m) rectangular space. An additional trading floor, nicknamed the Garage, is at 11 Wall Street. There are offices and meeting rooms in the upper stories of 18 Broad Street and 11 Wall Street.

The NYSE had occupied the site on Broad Street since 1865 but had to expand its previous building several times. The structure at 18 Broad Street was erected between 1901 and 1903. Within two decades, the NYSE's new building had become overcrowded, and the annex at 11 Wall Street was added between 1920 and 1922. Three additional trading floors were added in the late 20th century to accommodate increasing demand, and there were several proposals to move the NYSE elsewhere during that time. With the growing popularity of electronic trading in the 2000s, the three newer trading floors were closed in 2007.

The building was designated a National Historic Landmark in 1978 and designated a city landmark by the New York City Landmarks Preservation Commission in 1985. The building is also a contributing property to the Wall Street Historic District, a National Register of Historic Places district created in 2007.

== Site ==
The New York Stock Exchange (NYSE) Building is in the Financial District of Lower Manhattan, occupying the city block between Broad Street to the east, Wall Street to the north, New Street to the west, and Exchange Place to the south. The lot has a total area of 31,350 square feet (2,913 m^{2}). Nearby buildings include 1 Wall Street to the west; 14 Wall Street to the north; Federal Hall to the northeast; 23 Wall Street and 15 Broad Street to the east; Broad Exchange Building to the southeast; and 30 Broad Street to the south. The Broad Street station of the New York City Subway, served by the J and Z trains, originally contained two staircases that led to the sidewalk directly outside the New York Stock Exchange Building. One stair was closed in 2002, following the September 11 attacks, while the other was closed in 2012.

A security zone created after the September 11 attacks surrounds the NYSE Building. In addition, a pedestrian-only zone was established along several blocks immediately surrounding the building. Bollards were installed at several intersections around the building in the mid-2000s. In 2017, community group Downtown Alliance proposed improvements to the pedestrian-only zone surrounding the NYSE Building. The plans included a series of benches placed around the Fearless Girl statue on the Broad Street side of the building. The improvements also included the removal of the Broad Street subway entrances, which was approved in 2019.

== Architecture ==
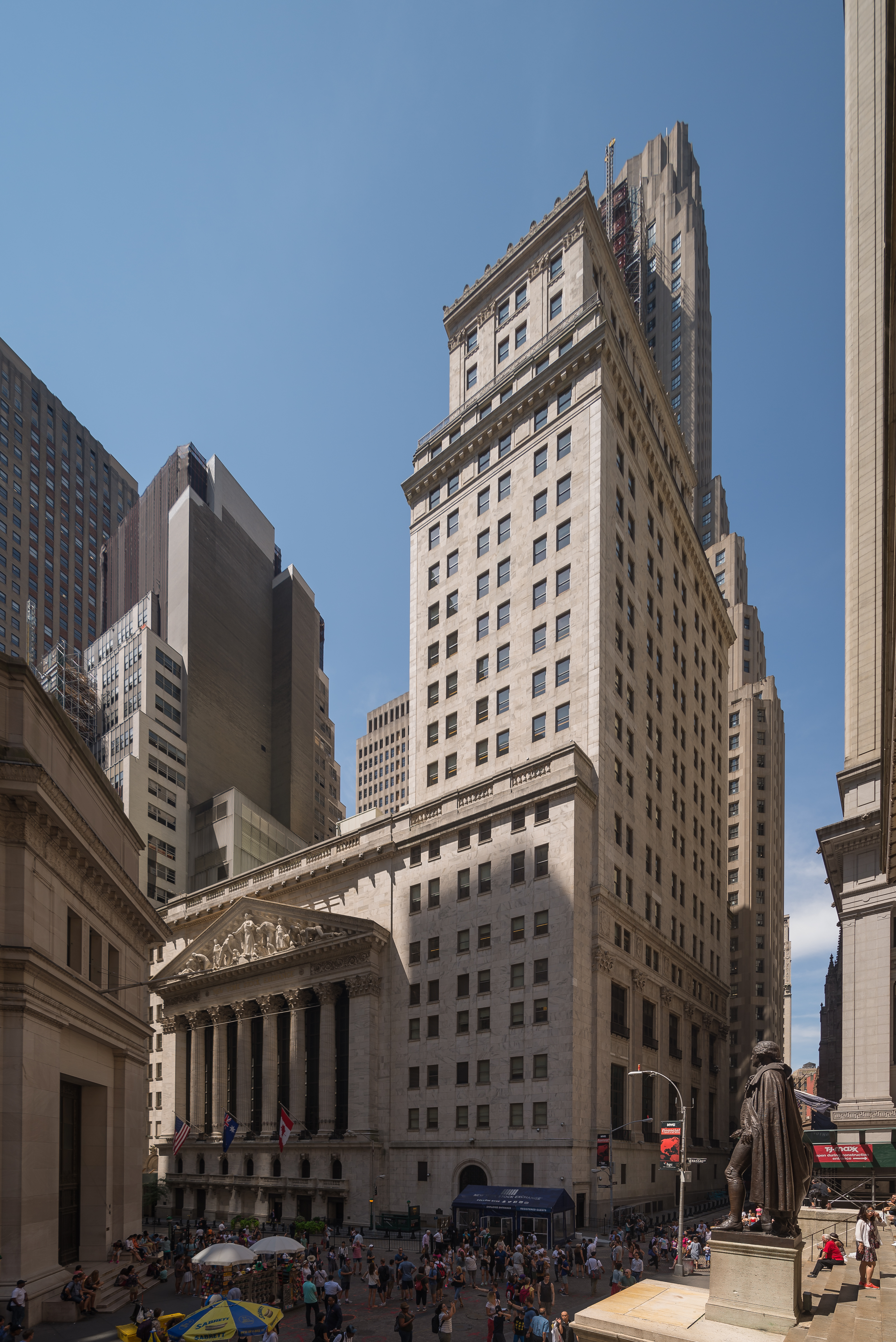
18 Broad Street (center left) and 11 Wall Street (center right), looking west from Federal Hall in 2017

The building houses the New York Stock Exchange, the world's largest stock exchange by market capitalization of its listed companies. It is at the same location as the NYSE's previous headquarters, which had dated to 1865. The NYSE Building is composed of two primary structures. The southern one, at 18 Broad Street in the center of the block, was designed by George B. Post in the Classical Revival style and completed in 1903, directly replacing the former headquarters. The northern structure, at 11 Wall Street on the northern end of the block, has a frontage directly on Wall Street; it was designed by Trowbridge & Livingston and completed in 1922. Due to the site's sloping topography, the first floor is at ground level at the corner of Wall and New Streets, but is one level above Broad Street.

=== Facade ===
==== 18 Broad Street ====
18 Broad Street, the older structure in the modern building, is at the center of the block. The structure has a facade of white Georgia marble and a roof 156 feet (48 m) above sidewalk level. 18 Broad Street has a frontage of 152 feet 10 inches (47 m) on New Street and 137 feet 8.5 inches (41.974 m) on Broad Street. The facade on Broad Street is inspired by ancient Roman sources, and writer Elizabeth Macaulay-Lewis compared the facade to that of the Maison Carrée in southern France.

The original structure contains colonnades along both Broad and New Streets. Unlike the Roman sources from which the design of 18 Broad Street's facade is derived, the building has entrances at basement level on both sides, rather than grand staircases leading to the colonnades. On Broad Street is a two-story podium made of granite blocks. It is divided vertically into seven bays of doorways at the basement, which on Broad Street is at ground level. There are arched windows with balconies on the first story. A decorative lintel tops each of the basement openings, while brackets support each short balcony. South of the podium is a two-bay-wide extension with a double-height arch at basement level, providing access to the offices near the trading floor. On New Street, rusticated marble blocks clad the basement and first stories, and the openings are simpler in design compared to the Broad Street facade.

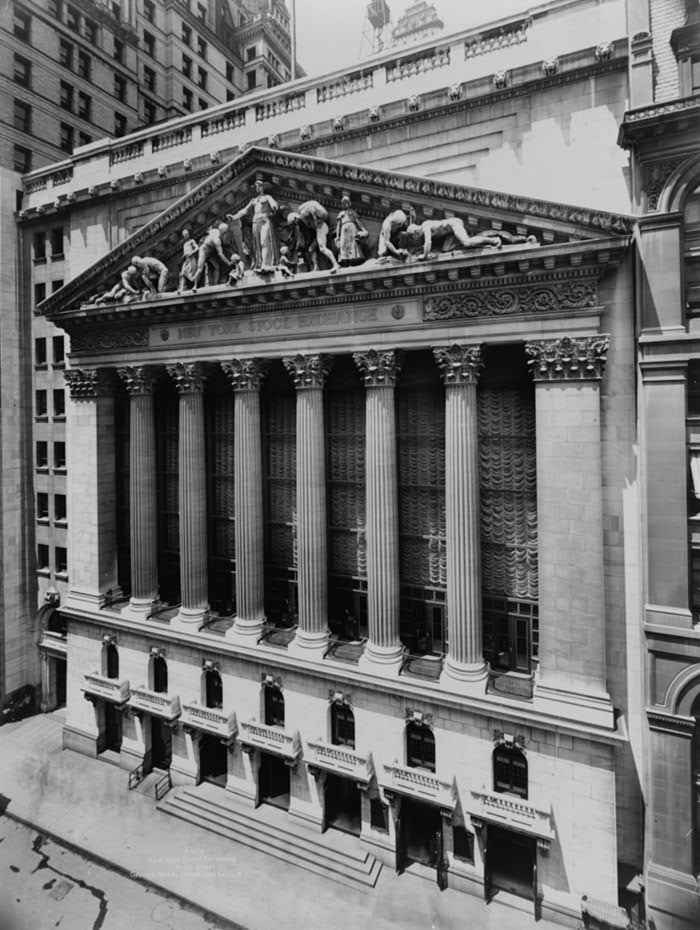
Broad Street colonnade, detailing the pediment (c. 1908)

Above the podiums on Broad and New Streets, the colonnades span the second through fifth stories. Both colonnades consist of two flat pilasters flanking six columns; each of the columns is 5.5 feet (1.7 m) in diameter and 52 feet (16 m) tall. The columns on Broad Street are fluted, while those on New Street are not. There are wrought-iron railings between each column. The colonnade on Broad Street supports an entablature with the words "New York Stock Exchange" in capital letters. Behind the colonnades are massive windows, each measuring about 96 feet (29 m) wide by 50 feet (15 m) tall. Each window has vertical iron mullions that can support its weight and resist wind pressure on each of them. The windows were originally double-glazed for insulation, and Post also designed movable vertical shades for the windows. The two southernmost bays on Broad Street, outside the colonnade, contain pairs of windows on each of the second through eighth stories.

Above the colonnade on Broad Street is a triangular pediment, originally carved by the Piccirilli Brothers and designed by John Quincy Adams Ward and Paul Wayland Bartlett. The pediment measures about 100 feet (30 m) above the sidewalk and about 110 feet (34 m) wide. It is composed of eleven figures representing commerce and industry. The central figure is a female representation of integrity, flanked by four pairs of figures depicting planning/building, exploring/mining, science/industry, and agriculture. Two small children, also described as putti, sit at Integrity's feet. The figures were originally fashioned in marble from 1908 to 1909; they were replaced in 1936 with sheet metal carvings coated with lead.

A cornice with egg-and-dart moldings and lions' head carvings runs atop the Broad Street facade. A parapet with a balustrade runs above the cornice on Broad Street. The New Street facade has a simple cornice.

==== 11 Wall Street ====
The northern annex at 11 Wall Street is 22 stories tall, or 23, including the ground-level basement on Broad Street, and is constructed of Georgia marble. It occupies an irregular lot extending 58 feet (18 m) on Broad Street, 156 feet (48 m) on Wall Street, and 100 feet (30 m) on New Street. 11 Wall Street has an overall height of 258 feet (79 m). The building's massing, or general form, incorporates setbacks at the ninth, nineteenth, and twentieth stories, as well as a roof above the twenty-second story. A heavy cornice runs above the eighteenth story.

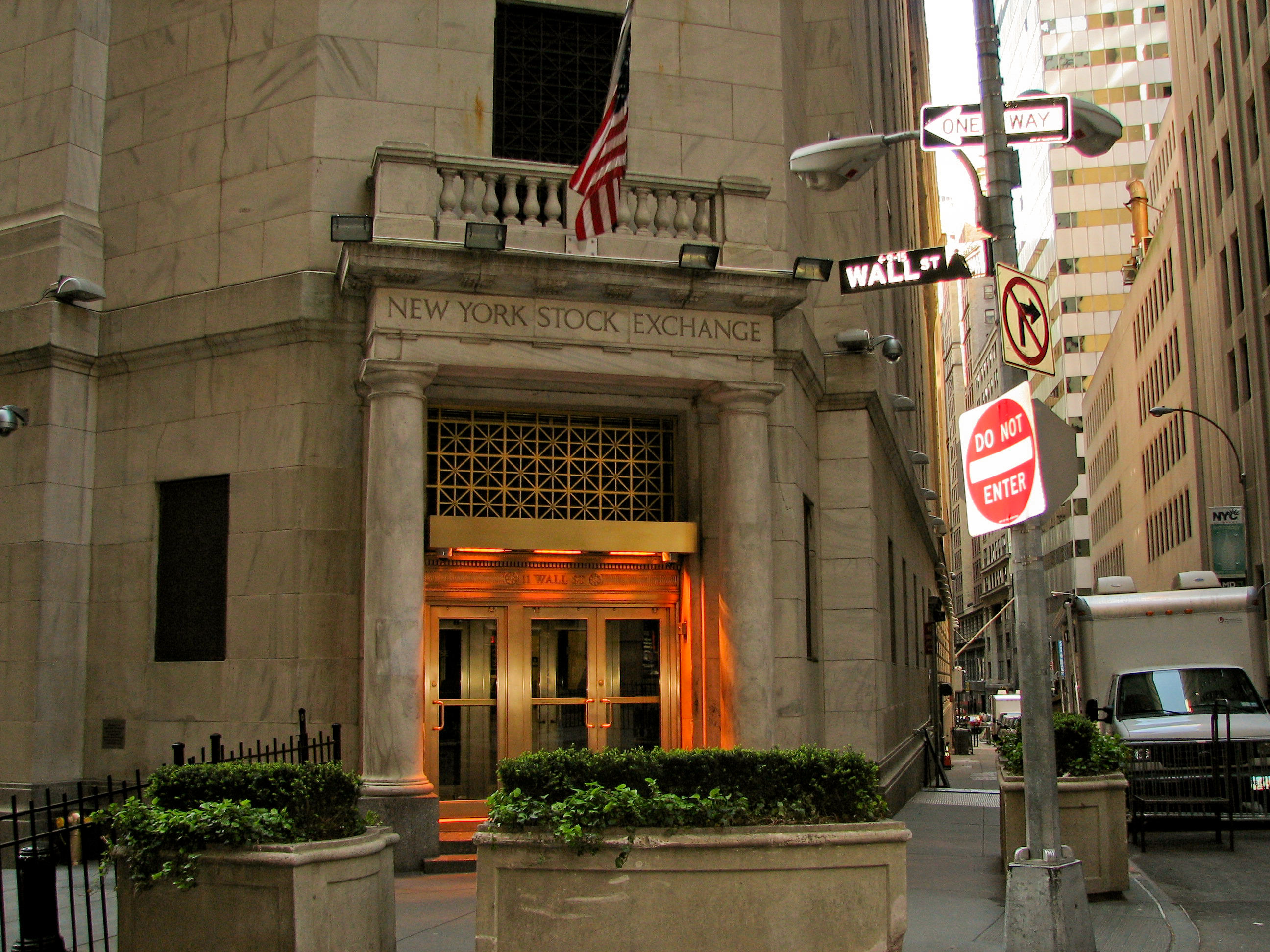
11 Wall Street entrance in 2006

The annex's main entrance is a chamfered corner at Wall and New Streets. It consists of a rectangular doorway with Doric columns on each side, above which are a transom, entablature, and balustrade. The windows on 11 Wall Street are largely paired rectangular sash windows. The annex contains design elements that visually connect it to the older building. On Broad Street, a belt course above the first story, two floors above street level, connects with the top of the podium on 18 Broad Street. The balustrade at the ninth story, ten floors above street level, connects with those atop 18 Broad Street. Additionally, on the Wall Street facade, there is a small row of Corinthian pilasters flanking the second- through fifth-story windows. These pilasters are similar in design to the colonnades of 18 Broad Street.

=== Interior ===
Ceiling of the stock exchange

The exchange is the locus for a large amount of technology and data. When the building was first completed, pneumatic tubes and telephones were installed on the trading floor and other parts of the building to facilitate communications. Some 25,000 feet (7,600 m) of pipes were used to heat and cool the offices. Four boilers generated a combined 800 horsepower (600 kW) of steam, while three power generators were capable of a combined 1,040 horsepower (780 kW). In addition, numerous elevators were constructed in the building's constituent structures. Six passenger elevators, three lifts, and five dumbwaiters were provided at 18 Broad Street. Eleven elevators were installed at 11 Wall Street. A 2001 article noted that the trading floor required 3,500 kilowatts (4,700 hp) of electricity, 8,000 phone circuits on the trading floor alone, and 200 miles (320 km) of fiber-optic cables below ground.

==== Basement ====
There are four basement levels. The machinery, electric and steam plants, maintenance workers' rooms, and vaults are in the basement and subbasement underneath the first-story trading floor. The building was constructed with a steel safe deposit vault measuring about 118.58 feet (36 m) wide, 21 feet (6 m) long, and 9 feet 10 inches (3 m) high, weighing 776 short tons (693 long tons; 704 t) when empty. A basement corridor led to the Wall Street station of the city's first subway line (now the 4 and 5 trains), under Broadway.

The lowest basement level is 42 feet (13 m) below Wall Street. The basement is surrounded by a concrete cofferdam resting on solid rock. The surrounding area had an atypically high water table, with groundwater being present a few feet below ground, partially because Broad Street was the former site of a drainage ditch. As a result, caissons were used to excavate part of the 18 Broad Street site, and a concrete cofferdam was built around it. The remainder of the basement and subbasements were then excavated. The caissons were built of wood and measured 30 by 8 by 50 feet (9 m × 2 m × 15 m) each.

==== Trading floors ====
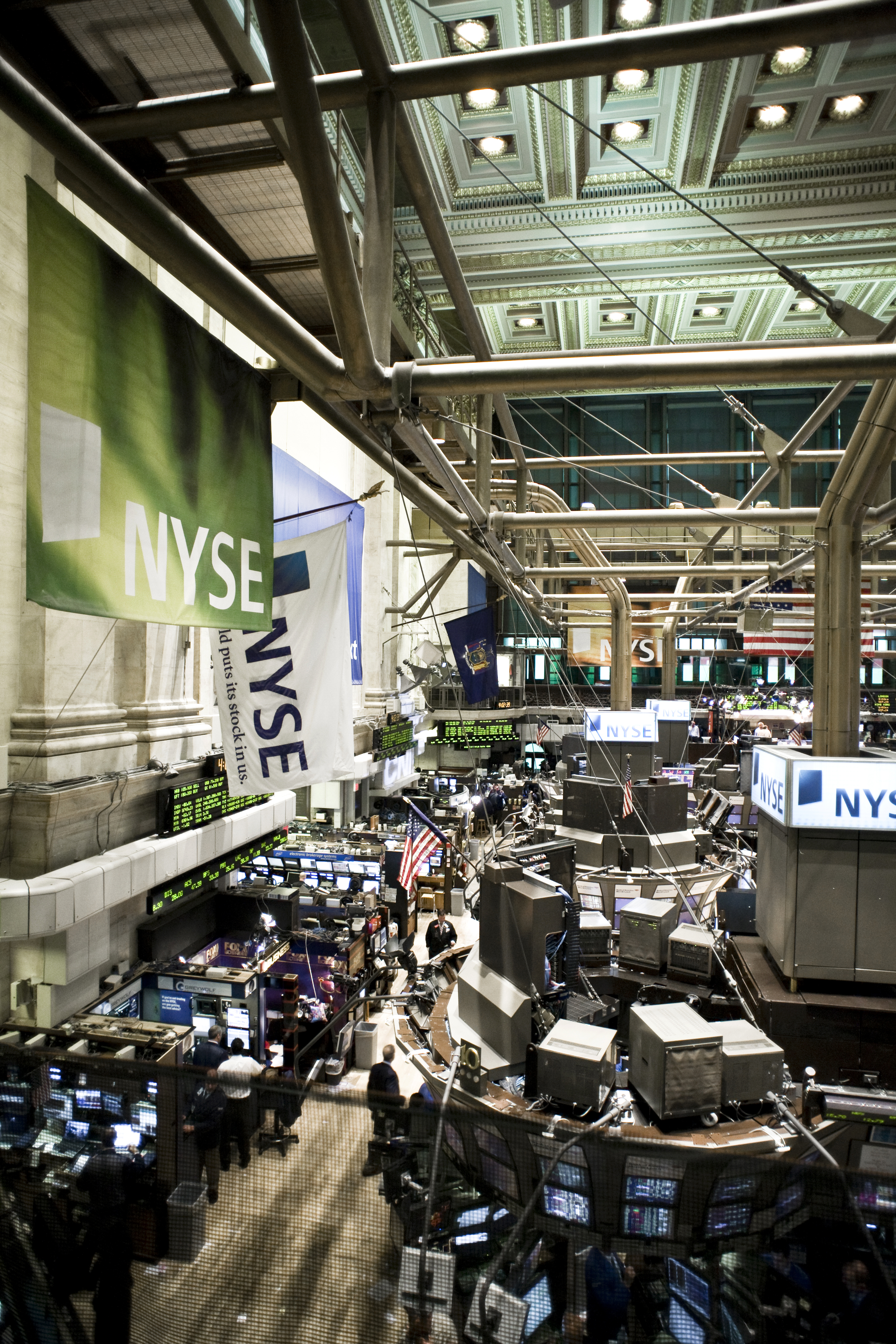
View of the main trading floor in 2009

The main trading floor (formerly the boardroom) on the first story at 18 Broad Street covers 15,000 square feet (1,400 m^{2}). The room extends the width of the block between New and Broad Streets. (Note: The NYSE, New-York Tribune, and Emporis all give floor dimensions of 109 by 140 feet (33 by 43 m), with a ceiling 72 feet (22 m) high. Architectural Record, the New-York Tribune, and Elizabeth Macaulay-Lewis give a width of 138 feet (42 m), a length of 112 feet (34 m), and a height of 80 feet (24 m). Architects' and Builders' Magazine gives a width of 144 feet (44 m), a length of 109 feet (33 m), and a height of 74.5 feet (22.7 m).) The trading floor was laid out to maximize usable space and, as a result, had minimal space for visitors on the floor itself. There was originally a narrow gallery for smokers on the New Street side and an admission area for guests on Broad Street.

The room's floor is at the same level as New and Wall Streets; as built, a marble double stair from the basement at Broad Street provided an entrance for members. The floor surface was originally covered with wood. Interrupting the main trading floor are eight iron columns, the placement of which was decided after twenty to thirty drawings. The lowest 20 feet (6.1 m) of the walls are clad in marble, with arched alcoves for access to other rooms. The marble panels contain bluish-brownstone centers and pink-marble metopes at the top. Four transverse trusses spanning the width of the room, measuring 115 feet (35 m) long and 15 feet (4.6 m) thick, support the ceiling. These trusses are carried on pairs of pilasters at each end and subdivide the ceiling into coffers. The center of the ceiling is fitted with a 30-by-30-foot (9.1 by 9.1 m) skylight, while the rest of the ceiling was gilded upon the building's completion.

As constructed, there were 500 telephones in the room, as well as annunciators clustered around the New Street end and surrounding the large columns on the floor. The northern and southern walls originally had colored "checkerboards" with over 1,200 panels, which could be lit in a variety of patterns to flash messages to members on the floor. Each of the four primary trading areas contain the NYSE's opening and closing bells (originally just one bell), which are rung to mark the beginning and the end of each trading day. Abutting the trading floor on higher levels were doctors' rooms, baths, and barbershops for NYSE members, in addition to call bells that could be rung whenever someone needed a broker to come down. A passageway leads north to the other trading floors at 11 Wall Street; another passage once led south to 20 Broad Street. By 2000, there were 17 trading posts on the trading floor, each with multiple electronic screens, where securities were traded by a specialist.

There is another trading floor at the northeast section of 11 Wall Street, nicknamed "the Garage". This floor is 106 feet (32 m) long and 50–80 feet (15–24 m) wide, while the ceiling is 43 feet (13 m) high. The decoration is similar to that of the main trading floor. Gray marble is used for the walls and public corridors, while the private corridors have Dover marble wainscoting and Alabama marble floors. Until 2007, there were three additional trading floors. The "Blue Room" and the "Extended Blue Room" were in 20 Broad Street, immediately south of the NYSE Building. There was also a trading room at the Continental Bank Building on 30 Broad Street, which had three additional trading posts.

==== Upper stories ====
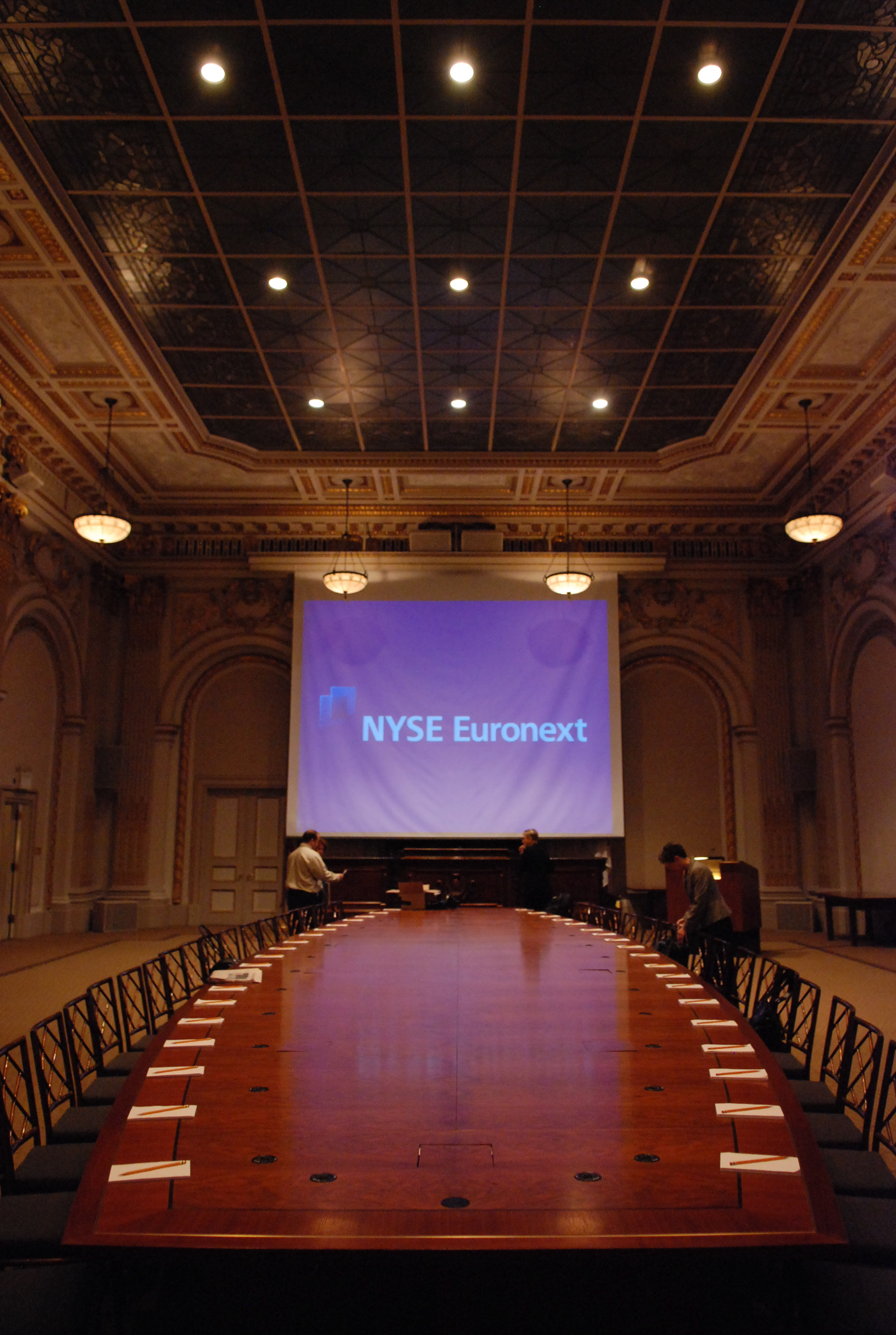
The boardroom, formerly the Bond Room in 2007

Post included a large interior light shaft on 18 Broad Street's upper stories as part of the building's design. The location of this shaft, and that of the trading floor, is affected by the planning of the various rooms in the upper stories. On the sixth story, above the trading floor, is the boardroom (formerly the Bond Room). This room has a skylight and coffered ceiling. The walls are adorned with white and gold decorations and contain arches supported by flat pilasters. While the room was originally outfitted with semicircular tiers surrounding a dais, these have since been removed.

The seventh story of 18 Broad Street contained the Luncheon Club facing New Street, which covered 12,055 square feet (1,119.9 m^{2}). The Luncheon Club's main dining room measured 76 by 40 feet (23 by 12 m), with an 18-foot (5.5 m) high ceiling. A smaller dining room was provided for non-smokers, separated from the main dining room by a lounge. The eighth story along New Street contained the club kitchen with a mezzanine-level serving gallery. After the Luncheon Club shut down in 2006, the room was converted into an event space called Freedom Hall.

The other rooms on the sixth story of 18 Broad Street included the Governor's Room on the Wall Street side, as well as the president's and secretary's rooms, committee rooms, and offices on the New Street side. The Committee on Arrangements and Admission room featured two large brass chandeliers. The other committee rooms on this story were similarly ornate. The seventh and eighth stories facing Broad Street contained committee rooms and offices. There are also offices on the upper floors at 11 Wall Street. Up to the 17th floor, a typical floor at 11 Wall Street contains 7,500 square feet (700 m^{2}) of space, but each of the top six floors spans 3,661 square feet (340.1 m^{2}) on average. The upper stories of both structures contain several event spaces.

== History ==
Goods had been traded on Wall Street as early as 1725. Auctioneers had intermediated securities exchanges until 1792, when brokers signed the Buttonwood Agreement to form an organization for securities trading, which later became the NYSE. In 1817, the organization re-formed as the New York Stock and Exchange Board. The broker organization began renting out space exclusively for securities trading, using several locations for the next half-century, including the Tontine Coffee House. Ten years later, the organization moved into the Merchants' Exchange at 55 Wall Street. Rapid growth in securities trading during the latter half of the nineteenth century was reflected in the growth of the Stock and Exchange Board.

=== Previous structure ===
In December 1865, the Stock and Exchange Board moved to 10 Broad Street, a T-shaped structure between Wall Street and Exchange Place. The New York Stock Exchange Building Company owned the structure, and the Exchange itself used a second-story room. The board's membership nearly doubled from 583 to 1,060 when it acquired the Open Board of Stock Brokers in 1869. The Stock and Exchange Board, originally a minor shareholder in the Building Company, bought all the company's stock in November 1870. The company acquired the lot at 12 Broad Street, and the two buildings were combined and expanded to designs by James Renwick Jr. The Stock Exchange Building reopened in September 1871. Within eight years, even the expansion was insufficient for the overcrowded NYSE. The exchange's governing committee thus purchased additional land on Broad and New Streets in late 1879. Renwick was hired for another extension of the previous Stock Exchange Building, which was completed in 1881. The expanded quarters provided better ventilation and lighting, as well as a larger board room.

The expanded building, with a trading floor measuring 141 by 145 feet (43 by 44 m), was insufficient for the NYSE's needs by 1885. That year, the city's sanitary engineers described the plumbing and ventilation as inadequate. The board room, nearer New Street, was expanded yet again in 1887 toward Broad Street. An 1891 guidebook characterized the Stock Exchange Building as a five-story French Renaissance marble structure, with a spur toward Wall Street, adjoining the Mortimer Building to the northeast. Even though the building sat largely on Broad and New Streets, it had become more closely associated with Wall Street. The building was largely shaped like a letter "T" and had a much longer frontage on New Street than on Broad Street. By the end of the 1890s, the structure was again overcrowded.

=== Replacement ===
==== Planning and construction ====
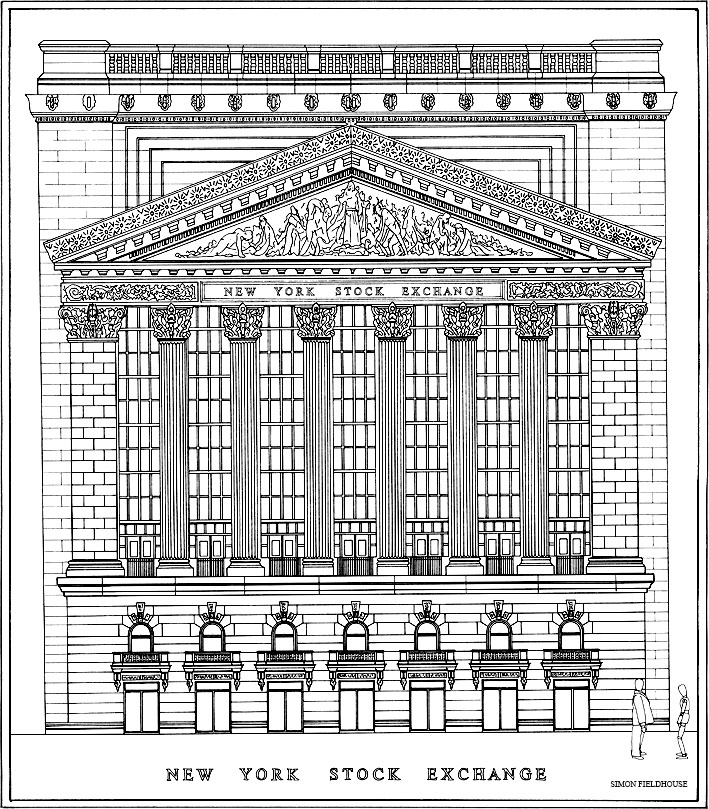
Front elevation drawing of the New York Stock Exchange, prepared by George B. Post

The NYSE acquired the plots at 16–18 Broad Street in late 1898 after two years of negotiation. The 16–18 Broad Street site cost more than $800,000 (equivalent to $26.39 million in 2025) and contained the Union Building. The NYSE was planning yet another expansion to its building, which was to start in 1903 after the plots' existing lease expired. The NYSE acquired the Swan Building on 8 Broad Street in January 1899, paying $425,000 (equivalent to $13.88 million in 2025) for the structure. The land cost $1.25 million in total (equivalent to $39.71 million in 2025). The resulting plot, with an estimated total value of $3.5 million (equivalent to $111.19 million in 2025), measured 153 feet (47 m) wide on New Street and 138 feet (42 m) wide on Broad Street.

Eight architects were invited to participate in an architectural design competition for a replacement building on the site. This competition involved a brief by architects William Ware and Charles W. Clinton. The foremost consideration was that the trading floor had to be an open space with few to no interruptions. The NYSE solicited proposals for a structure that had banking space on the ground floor, as well as proposals with no such space. The plans had to consider the lot's complex topography, unusual shape, underlying ground, and the removal of the large deposit vault. The publicist Ivy Lee wrote that the structure was to "be both monumental architecturally and equipped with every device that mechanics, electricity or ingenuity could supply with every resource needed to transact the security trading for the commercial center of the world". The exchange briefly contemplated an eight-to-nine-story structure with offices above its trading floor, but the NYSE ultimately discarded this proposal as unwieldy. The NYSE governors ultimately decided against including a ground-level banking room, which they felt would restrict movement during emergencies.

In December 1899, the NYSE's governing committee unanimously approved the submission by George B. Post. That month, a committee was formed to oversee the construction of the new building. Post continued to revise his design during the next year. By July 1900, the NYSE had arranged to move to the New York Produce Exchange at Bowling Green while the replacement NYSE Building was being constructed. Post filed plans for the building with the New York City Department of Buildings on April 19, 1901. Eight days later, the traders stopped working at the old building. The cornerstone was laid on September 9, 1901. The contractors excavating the site had to work around the old vault, which not only had to be preserved while the new vault and foundations were being built, but had to be delicately demolished afterward.

Initially, the contractors had planned for the new structure to be completed within one year of the old building's closure. Various issues delayed the opening by one year, including difficulty in demolishing the old building, as well as alterations made to the original plan during construction. R. H. Thomas, a chairman of the committee that oversaw construction, justified the delay by saying, "Where so many of our members spend the active years of their lives, they are entitled to the best that architectural ingenuity and engineering skill can produce." Over two thousand guests attended the building's dedication ceremony on April 22, 1903. The event included speeches from Rudolph Keppler, the president of the New York Stock Exchange, and Seth Low, the mayor of New York City. The trading floor opened for business the following day. The New York Times reported, "When the gavel fell many brokers vied with each other for the honor of making the first business transaction."

==== Early years and annex ====
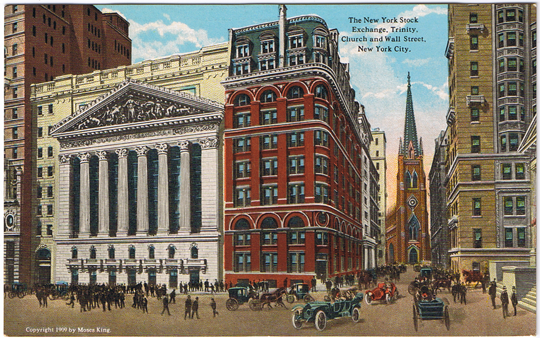
A color postcard showing Broad Street in 1909, with the NYSE Building, Wilks Building, and Trinity Church from left to right

In the years after the NYSE Building's completion, the exchange encountered difficulties, including the Panic of 1907, when the NYSE had dropped by almost fifty percent from the previous year's peak. The onset of World War I in Europe in 1914 led many investors to liquidate their securities for gold. As a result, the NYSE trading floor was fully closed for four months in 1914, the first time such a prolonged closure had occurred. The trading of wartime stocks led to an increase in business at the New York Curb Exchange outside the NYSE Building and, by 1916, the NYSE was contemplating allowing the Curb to move inside. This plan failed, and the Curb built its own structure at 86 Trinity Place, several blocks to the west, in 1921. The Wall Street bombing occurred outside the building on September 16, 1920, killing thirty-eight people and injuring hundreds more.

In its first two decades, and especially following the end of World War I, the NYSE grew significantly. The rebuilt 18 Broad Street quarters quickly became insufficient for the exchange's needs. In December 1918, the NYSE bought the Mortimer Building northeast of its existing structure, giving the exchange an additional 3,220 square feet (299 m^{2}). The annex would give the building a full frontage on Wall Street, whereas previously 18 Broad Street only ran along Wall Street for 15 feet (4.6 m). The Mortimer Building's demolition commenced in mid-1919. The NYSE also leased the Wilks Building northwest of its existing structure in January 1920; the lot was assessed at $1.9 million (equivalent to $23.1 million in 2025). Demolition of the Wilks Building began in June 1920.

Trowbridge and Livingston received the commission to design an annex on the Mortimer and Wilks sites, while Marc Eidlitz and Son received the contract for the construction of the annex. Plans for an annex at 11 Wall Street, reaching twenty-two stories above a basement, were finalized in February 1920. The NYSE would lease the first eight stories and the basement, including several stories for an expanded trading floor known as the "Garage", while the upper stories would be leased to office tenants. By August 1922, the annex was nearly complete, and several firms had already signed leases for about 60 percent of the available office space. The annex's trading floor opened during the last week of December 1922. The New York Stock Exchange Safe Deposit Company began operating the vaults in the basement that year.

=== Later operations and expansions ===
==== 1920s to 1940s ====
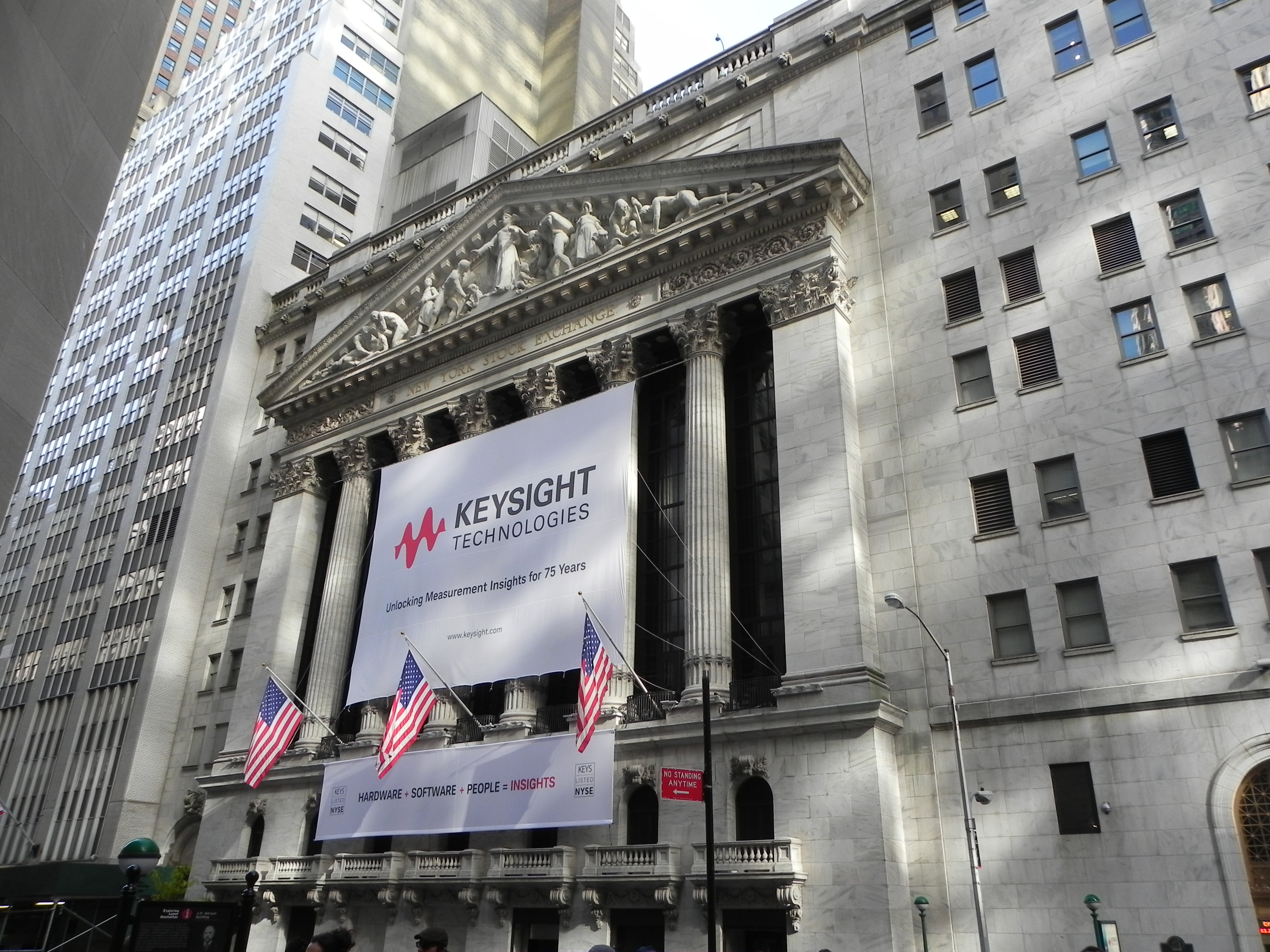
The exchange leased three floors at the Commercial Cable Building on 20 Broad Street in 1926, then bought it outright in 1928. That building was demolished and replaced with a new building (left) in 1956.

The office annex was insufficient to accommodate the long-term growth of the NYSE. In mid-1926, the exchange leased three floors at the neighboring Commercial Cable Building on 20 Broad Street. The ground floor was planned to be connected to that of 18 Broad Street, while the first and second floors of that building would be combined into a single bond trading room with a high ceiling. These stories were internally connected to 18 Broad Street, although they remained separate buildings. In 1928, the NYSE bought not only the Commercial Cable Building but also the Blair Building, taking control of all the property on the city block.

The NYSE's growth stopped suddenly with the Wall Street Crash of 1929, when share prices on the exchange dropped 23 percent in two days, in what was cited as one cause of the Great Depression. The NYSE trading floor was closed for over a week during the Depression, in March 1933, after President Franklin D. Roosevelt signed the Emergency Banking Act. The marble sculptures of the pediment on Broad Street, which had deteriorated over the years, were replaced in 1936. The new figures were made of metal, though this was kept secret for eighteen years. At the end of the Great Depression, the NYSE grew again. Manufacturers Trust took over the basement vaults in 1942 when the NYSE Safe Deposit Company was dissolved. During World War II, women were allowed to trade in the building for the first time in the Exchange's history.

==== 1950s to 1970s ====
By 1954, the NYSE was planning to replace the building at 20 Broad Street with a skyscraper, a portion of which would contain auxiliary facilities for the NYSE. The exchange formally held an option to expand its trading floor to 20 Broad Street if the need arose. The structure, designed by Kahn & Jacobs and Sidney Goldstone, was completed in 1956 with 27 stories and 421,000 square feet (39,100 m^{2}). The NYSE initially used the second through fourth floors at 20 Broad Street, corresponding to the first through third floors of its main building, as exhibition space. The new building was not part of the NYSE Building, and the New York Life Insurance Company bought 20 Broad Street in 1959.

By the early 1960s, the NYSE needed to expand its operations again and was considering moving out of its main building entirely. Previously, the structure had housed some securities firms that were also members of the exchange, but the NYSE needed the space for itself, and the last firm moved out during late 1961. At that time, the NYSE's leadership hoped to acquire land in Lower Manhattan and construct a new building within five years. The NYSE made several proposals for new headquarters, none of which were carried out. (Note: Skidmore, Owings & Merrill (SOM) and Richard W. Adler proposed new NYSE buildings at the first World Trade Center in 1960–1961. O'Connor & Kilham and I. M. Pei made proposals in 1963, and SOM's Gordon Bunshaft made a proposal in 1966.) The exchange selected a site in Battery Park City in 1965 but dropped plans for the site the next year. The NYSE's governors voted in 1967 to expand the trading floor into 20 Broad Street. The expansion, nicknamed the "Blue Room", opened in July 1969. It provided 8,000 square feet (740 m^{2}) of additional space to the 23,000-square-foot (2,100 m^{2}) trading floor, which could accommodate almost two hundred more clerks. In addition, some of the computer facilities were moved to Paramus, New Jersey, between 1967 and 1969.

The NYSE looked to build a new headquarters along the East River, at the eastern end of Wall Street, in the long term. These plans were postponed indefinitely in 1970 due to the recession of 1969–1970. In 1977, the media published rumors that the NYSE and the American Stock Exchange (AMEX) would merge and construct a new combined facility; however, the merger did not occur at that time. As a temporary measure, the NYSE renovated its visitors' center in 1979, adding a multi-story gallery with various displays adjacent to the main trading floor.

==== 1980s and 1990s ====
Still short on space, the NYSE rented some offices at 100 Broadway, one block away, in 1980. The NYSE was looking to expand its trading floor again and, in 1985, announced an $11 million (equivalent to $27.92 million in 2025) extension of the Blue Room at 20 Broad Street, which would add 7,000 square feet (650 m^{2}) to the trading floor. This expansion was completed by 1988. In addition, the original bell inside the main trading floor was replaced in the late 1980s.

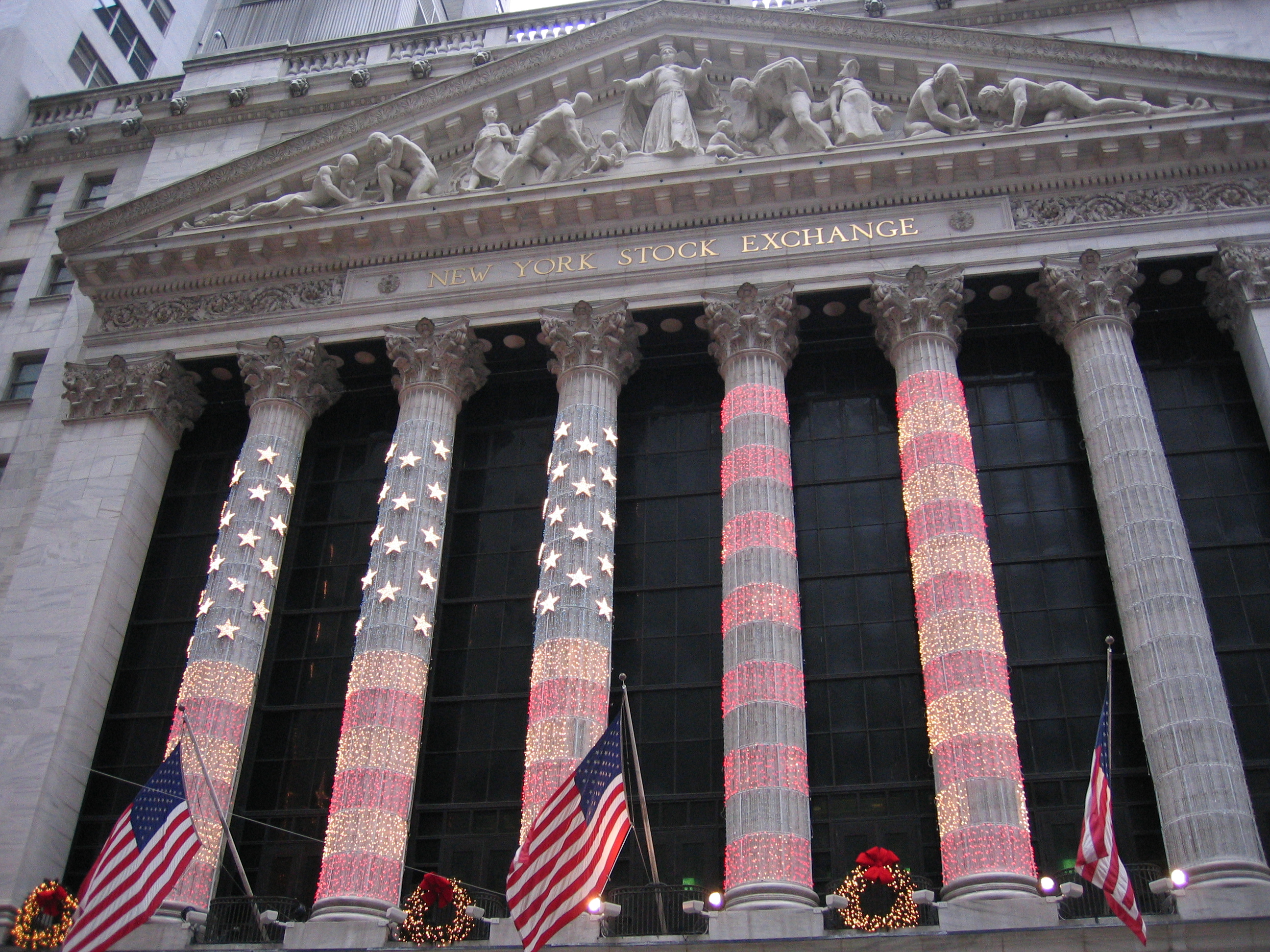
The NYSE Building as seen at Christmas in 2007

The NYSE, AMEX, and J.P. Morgan & Co. proposed the creation of a financial "supercenter" on the block immediately east of the NYSE Building, across Broad Street, in 1992. The supercenter, to be developed by Olympia and York and designed by Skidmore, Owings & Merrill (SOM), would have consisted of a 50-story tower above two 50,000-square-foot (4,600 m^{2}) trading floors. After Olympia and York severed their involvement because of financial difficulties, a team composed of J.P. Morgan & Co., Lewis Rudin, Gerald D. Hines, and Fred Wilpon took over the project. The NYSE withdrew from the supercenter in 1993. The next year, NYSE officials constructed a model trading floor for "3D trading", where securities were displayed on electronic screens.

The NYSE resumed its search for alternate sites for its headquarters in mid-1996. During the previous five years, over a thousand companies had been listed on the exchange's board, and trading volume had more than doubled. At one such site, along the East River at the end of Wall Street, developer Donald Trump proposed a 140-story building designed by Kohn Pedersen Fox for the NYSE, which would have been the world's tallest building. Other sites under consideration included the Broad Exchange Building immediately to the southeast, as well as Bowling Green at the southern end of Manhattan. The NYSE also considered relocating to the World Financial Center in nearby Battery Park City, as well as a site in Jersey City across the Hudson River. City authorities offered $600 million in tax incentives to keep the NYSE in the Financial District, which in turn increased the cost of the new building.

In late 1996, the NYSE proposed expanding the existing building eastward above Broad Street, closing it to vehicular traffic, and creating a glass-covered atrium above the street. The city and state governments agreed to the plans in December 1998, but NYSE officials were considering canceling these plans by the next year, amid the growing popularity of electronic trading. Although financial firms had been clustered around the NYSE Building in the early 20th century, the prevalence of electronic trading meant that these firms no longer had to be physically near the building. The initial plan for the atrium by HLW International was also widely criticized, as was a modification by Hugh Hardy, and the NYSE ultimately dropped the atrium proposal. The NYSE Building remained a popular tourist attraction, and the exchange built a visitor center at the building for $2 million in the late 1990s. The NYSE also hosted tours of the structure, which were restricted to 3,000 daily visitors.

==== 2000s to present ====
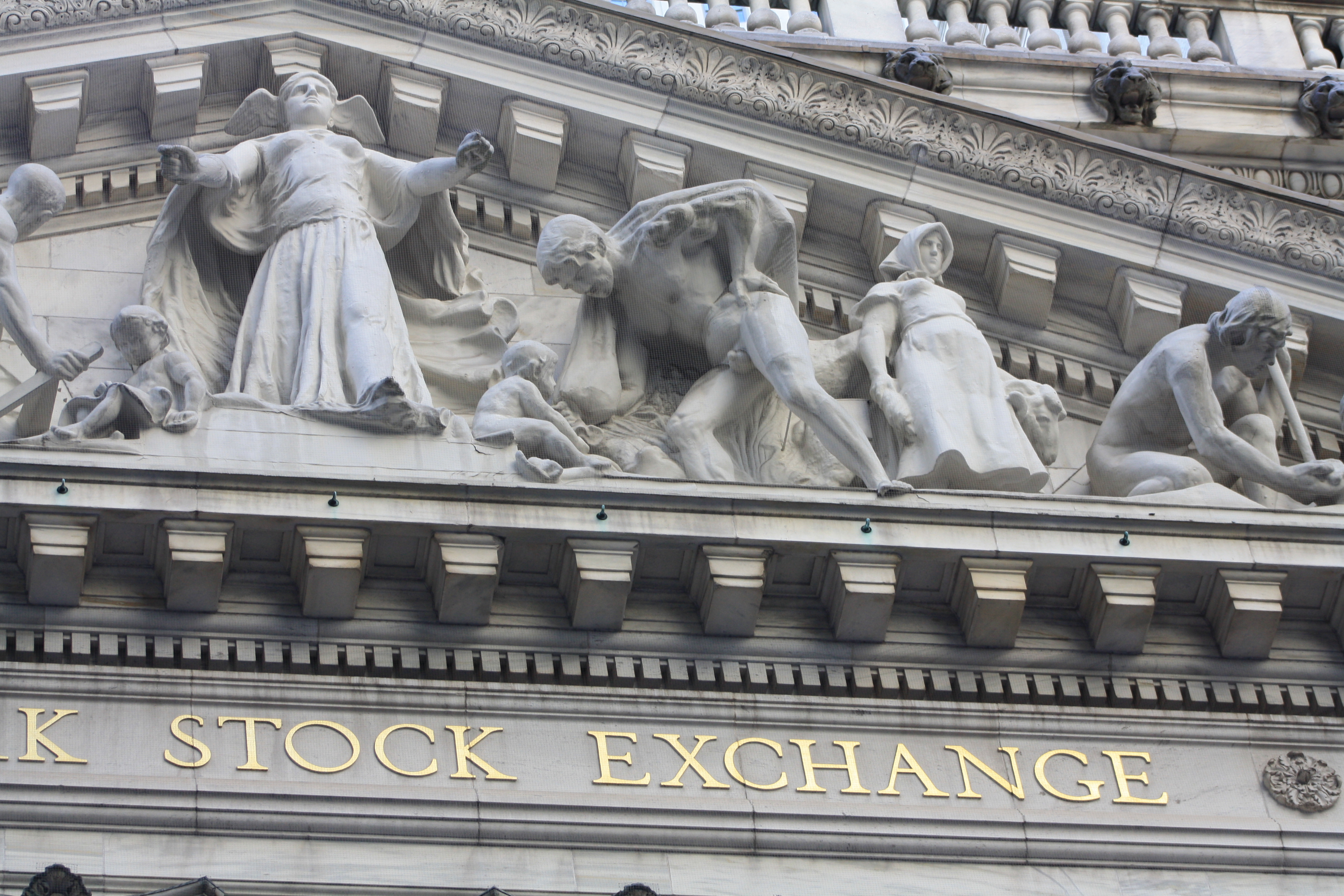
Detail of the facade

As an interim measure, the NYSE looked into opening a trading floor at 30 Broad Street less than a block to the south in 1998. The expansion, which opened in late 2000, consisted of a 10,000-square-foot (930 m^{2}) facility designed by SOM. The same year, the NYSE and the city and state governments of New York agreed to acquire the block to the east. The plan included demolishing all structures except for 23 Wall Street to make way for a 50-story skyscraper designed by SOM. The September 11, 2001, terrorist attacks resulted in only the third multi-day closure of the NYSE's trading floor in the building's history. After the attacks, the NYSE sought to decentralize its operations, and the Lower Manhattan expansion was ultimately canceled in 2002 because the NYSE wanted to build a trading floor elsewhere.

Over the following years, the increase in electronic trading made physical trading space redundant. The floor accounted for fewer than half of trades in 2007, down from 80 percent in 2004. As a result, the 30 Broad Street trading floor closed in February 2007. The NYSE announced later the same year that the Blue Room and Extended Blue Room at 20 Broad Street would close, leaving only the main floor and the Garage; The former space at 20 Broad Street became a residential building in 2018. The NYSE Building's trading floor was closed for two months in 2020 during the COVID-19 pandemic in New York City, but electronic trading continued throughout. By the mid-2020s, The Wall Street Journal described the trading floor as being much quieter than in the 20th century, amid a trend of financial firms leaving the neighborhood. The Financial Times described the trading floor in 2021 as "largely a TV studio" and said that most trading was done electronically in New Jersey.

== Impact ==
=== Critical reception ===
When the 18 Broad Street building was completed, publicist Ivy Lee wrote: "In outer contour it suggests the columnar, monumental architecture of the ancient Greeks. But this exterior shelters the very essence of the strenuous energy of this twentieth century." Percy C. Stuart of Architectural Record said in 1901: "It will be the first great commercial edifice to be built in New York in the twentieth century, a fitting precursor of an age destined for great buildings." Architectural critic Montgomery Schuyler appraised the building as a "very brilliant and successful piece of work". Schuyler especially appreciated that the colonnades' columns visually divided the large windows behind them; his only negative criticism was that the carving of the basement was incongruous with the rest of the design.

After the annex was completed, the Downtown League declared it to be the "best building" erected in Lower Manhattan in 1922. Elizabeth Macaulay-Lewis said in 2021: "The massive building imbued the NYSE with authority, reflecting its view of itself and its role in the economy" while also providing space for a trading floor.

Some commentary focused on specific parts of the design. Stuart of Architectural Record wrote that, with the colonnades and large trading-floor windows, "the new Exchange will have a scale of its own, at once so simple and impressive as to readily signalize it among its surroundings". Conversely, Scribner's Magazine wrote in 1903 that the pediment on Broad Street was disadvantaged by its location opposite several tall buildings, "which has caused Ward to give to his figures very great scale and to diminish their number". An Architectural Record article the following year pointed out a similar issue, stating that a front view was extremely difficult unless one entered a nearby building, and that "neither architect nor sculptor could have expected many persons to examine the building in that way". Architectural writer Robert A. M. Stern said that the pediment's sculptures gave the building "an air of magisterial calm as it presided over the financial world's most important intersection".

=== Cultural impact ===
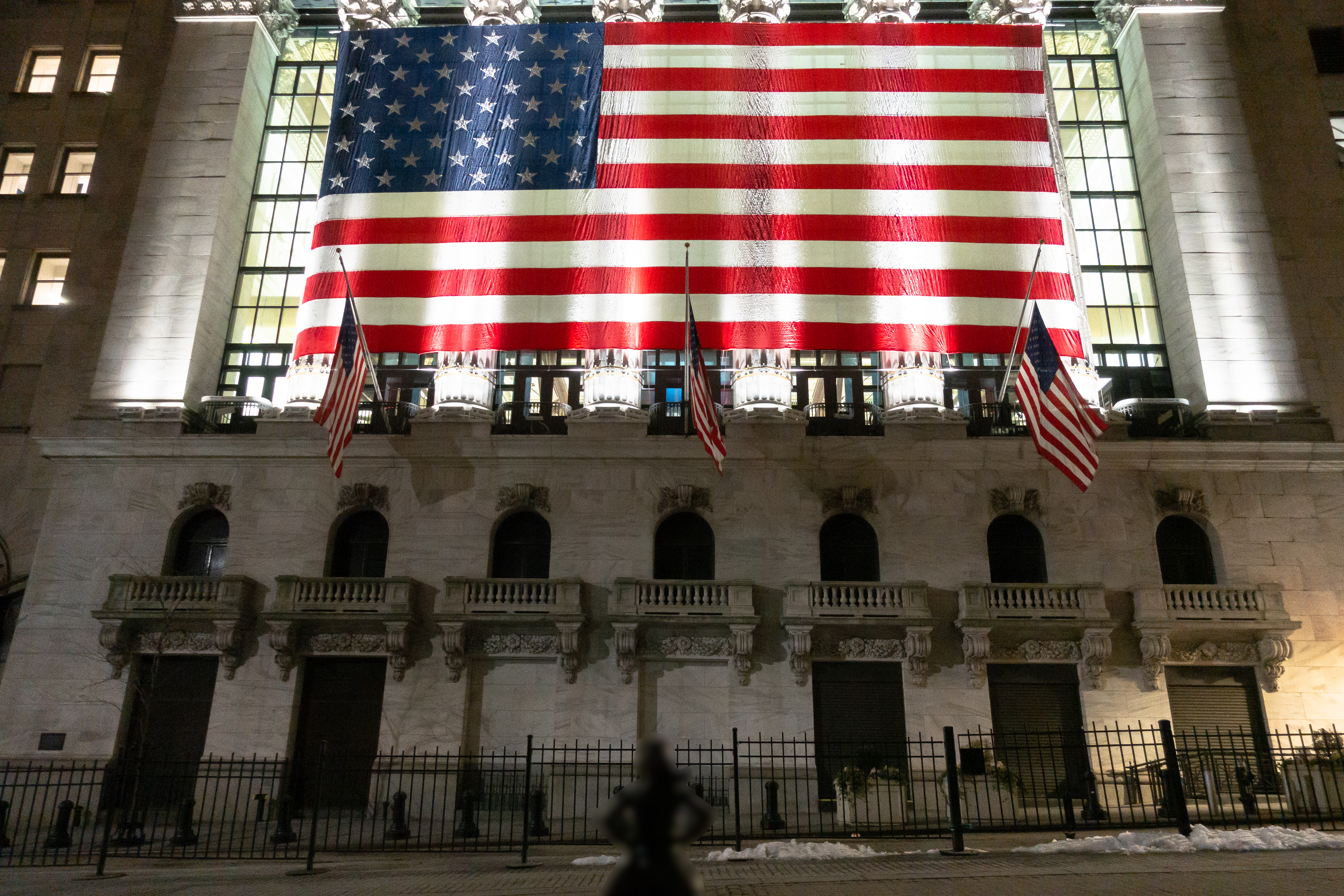
Blurred image of Fearless Girl (bottom) facing the New York Stock Exchange Building in 2019

The NYSE's logo, on which the NYSE holds a trademark, depicts the columns on the 18 Broad Street building. This has led to disputes when coupled with the building's status as an icon of the NYSE. For instance, in 1999, the NYSE unsuccessfully sued the New York-New York Hotel and Casino for trademark infringement after the hotel's developers built the "New York-New York $lot Exchange", loosely based on 18 Broad Street.

The NYSE Building's prominence has also made it the location of artworks. In 1989, artist Arturo Di Modica installed his sculpture Charging Bull in front of the building, in an act of guerrilla art. The sculpture was removed within a day and ultimately reinstalled at Bowling Green, two blocks south. Subsequently, in 2018, Kristen Visbal's bronze sculpture Fearless Girl was installed outside the NYSE Building on Broad Street. The Fearless Girl sculpture was originally installed in 2017 facing Charging Bull at Bowling Green, but it was moved to the NYSE because of complaints from Di Modica.

=== Landmark designations ===
As early as 1965, the New York City Landmarks Preservation Commission (LPC) had considered designating the 18 Broad Street building, but not the 11 Wall Street annex, as a landmark. It was one of the first buildings the LPC had proposed for landmark status, as the commission had just gained the authority to designate the city's structures as landmarks. At the time, the NYSE and several private owners opposed landmark status for their respective buildings, since any proposed modification to a landmark would require a cumbersome review by the city government. The LPC hosted a second landmark hearing in 1980 but again declined to designate the building. In 1983, The New York Times cited the NYSE Building as one of several prominent structures that had not been designated by the LPC in the agency's first eighteen years, alongside Rockefeller Center and the Woolworth Building. The LPC reconsidered designation for 18 Broad Street in 1985. After numerous public hearings, the LPC finally granted landmark status to 18 Broad Street on July 9, 1985, as landmark number 1529.

Both 18 Broad Street and 11 Wall Street were added to the National Register of Historic Places (NRHP) as a National Historic Landmark on June 2, 1978, marking them as sites that add "exceptional value to the nation". The building was designated as a contributing property to the Wall Street Historic District, a National Register of Historic Places district, in 2007.

== See also ==
- List of National Historic Landmarks in New York City
- List of New York City Designated Landmarks in Manhattan below 14th Street
- National Register of Historic Places listings in Manhattan below 14th Street
