= Parkers =

Parkers may refer to:

- Parker's (pretzels), an Australian pretzels company
- Parker's Car Guides, a British car magazine
- The Parkers, an American television sitcom

== See also ==
- Parker (disambiguation)
