= Perker =

Perker may refer to:

- Perker, a Middle Eastern immigrant to Denmark, speaking Perkerdansk
- Aslı Perker (born 1975), Turkish journalist and writer
- M. K. Perker (born 1972), Turkish artist
- Philip Lee (cricketer) (1904–1980), Australian cricketer nicknamed Perker

== See also ==
- Perky (disambiguation)
- Parker (disambiguation)
