= Judge Parker (disambiguation) =

Judge Parker is a syndicated comic strip.

Judge Parker may also refer to:

- Alton B. Parker (1852–1926), judge of the New York Court of Appeals and presidential candidate
- Barrington D. Parker (1915–1993), judge of the United States District Court for the District of Columbia
- Barrington D. Parker Jr. (born 1944), judge of the United States Court of Appeals for the Second Circuit
- Edna G. Parker (1930–1996), judge of the United States Tax Court
- Fred I. Parker (1938–2003), judge of the United States Court of Appeals for the Second Circuit
- Isaac C. Parker (1838–1896), judge of the United States District Court for the Western District of Arkansas
- James Aubrey Parker (1937–2022), judge of the United States District Court for the District of New Mexico
- John J. Parker (1885–1958), judge of the United States Court of Appeals for the Fourth Circuit
- John Victor Parker (1928–2014), judge of the United States District Court for the Middle District of Louisiana
- Linda Vivienne Parker (born 1958), judge of the United States District Court for the Eastern District of Michigan
- Robert Manley Parker (1937–2020), judge of the United States Court of Appeals for the Fifth Circuit
- Tommy Parker (judge) (born 1963), judge of the United States District Court for the Western District of Tennessee

== See also ==
- Justice Parker (disambiguation)
