= New York Stock Exchange Safe Deposit Company =

Historical Business in New York City

- Company type: Subsidiary
- Industry: Financial services
- Founded: 1906
- Founder: New York Stock Exchange
- Defunct: 1942
- Fate: Sold to the Manufacturers Trust Company
- Successor: Manufacturers Safe Deposit Company
- Headquarters: New York City, United States
- Area served: New York
- Products: Safe deposit boxes

The New York Stock Exchange Safe Deposit Company (NYSESDC) was a wholly owned subsidiary of the New York Stock Exchange (NYSE) that provided secure vault and safe deposit services to NYSE members and affiliated firms.

Organized in 1906, and formally incorporated in 1913 the company operated vault facilities in the basement of the Exchange building at 10 Broad Street in New York City.

The company was dissolved in 1942 following its sale to Manufacturers Safe Deposit Company, a subsidiary of Manufacturers Trust Company.

== History ==
The New York Stock Exchange Safe Deposit Company was organized in 1906 with 606 members. Alexander E. Orr was elected as the company's first president. In May 1907, Orr declined re-election due to ill health and was succeeded by William H. Pearson, who had previously served as Vice President and Secretary. The company was formally incorporated on March 13, 1913, with a capital of $100,000 (equivalent to $2,300,000 in 2024). The certificate of incorporation was approved by the State Banking Department on April 18, 1913. The initial directors were Rudolph Keppler, Ernest Groesbeck, James B. Mabon, Warren B. Nash, and Henry K. Pomeroy, all of New York City. James B. Mabon served as president of the company from 1914, also serving concurrently as president of the New York Stock Exchange from 1912 to 1914. Marion J. Verdery was elected secretary in 1908 and served for sixteen years until his death in November 1924. He was succeeded by F. J. Spadinger in April 1924.

In 1922, when a new 23-story addition to the Stock Exchange building was completed, the safe deposit vaults were located in the basement beneath the trading floor. The vaults were constructed with heavy laminated steel and were the largest and best protected safe-deposit vaults in the world. The contracts for vault construction were awarded to York Safe and Lock Company, a leading vault manufacturer that also supplied installations for major banks and federal institutions with vault doors provided by the Remington & Sherman Company. The company joined the New York State Safe Deposit Association in 1922.

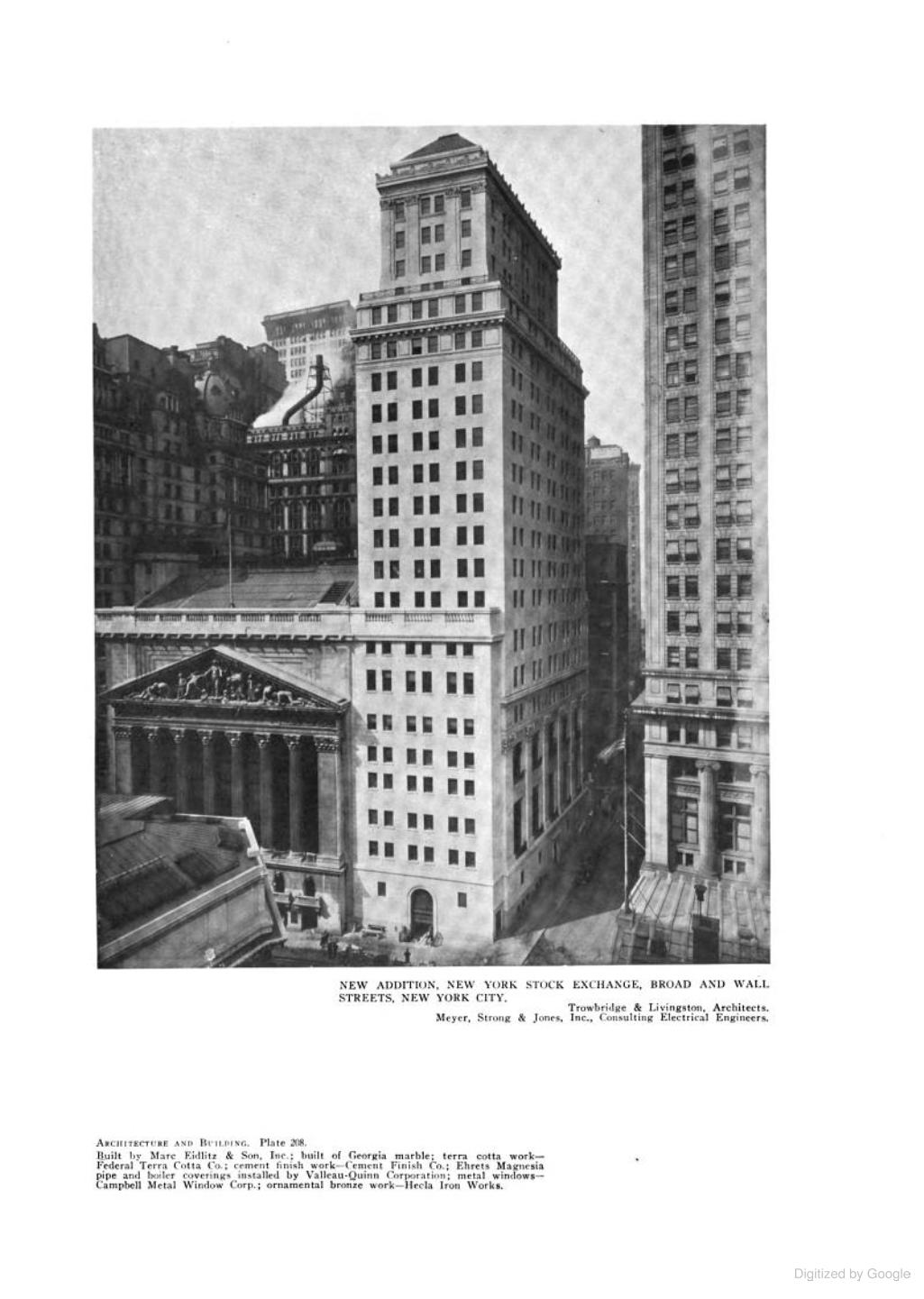
New Addition to New York Stock Exchange Building 1922

In 1926, the company employed 12 staff members as part of the broader Stock Exchange organization of 1,309 employees. The vaults served as a critical component of Wall Street's daily operations, with brokerage firms renting vault space to secure customer securities overnight. Each morning, employees from Exchange houses would retrieve their steel boxes from the vaults, accompanied by guards, and return them after the market closed.

E. H. H. Simmons was president of NYSESDC in 1925, and served until at least 1936. The company continued to provide essential safe deposit services to Stock Exchange members and the broader financial community throughout the 1930s.

=== Sale and dissolution (1939–1942) ===
In late 1939, the New York Stock Exchange indicated its willingness to sell the safe deposit company along with other properties. On January 25, 1940, William McChesney Martin president of both the Stock Exchange and the subsidiary NYSE SDC , announced the sale of the company to Manufacturers Safe Deposit Company, a subsidiary of Manufacturers Trust Company.

The transaction was approved by the New York State Banking Department, and on February 15, 1940, the Manufacturers Safe Deposit Company began providing vault services in the Stock Exchange building at 10 Broad Street. The New York Stock Exchange Safe Deposit Company was formally dissolved on October 24, 1942, with court orders terminating its corporate existence filed with the New York State Banking Department.

== Organization and operations ==
NYSE SDC operated as a subsidiary corporation of the NYSE, with all stock held by the Exchange's governors as trustees for the members. It was one of several subsidiary corporations that handled routine functions of the Exchange, alongside the Stock Clearing Corporation, the New York Quotation Company, and the New York Stock Exchange Building Company.

New York Stock Exchange Organization Chart

The company's facilities were located in the basement of the Stock Exchange building at 10 Broad Street in Lower Manhattan. The vaults contained thousands of safe deposit boxes and featured walls constructed of multiple layers of steel. The door to the largest vault weighed over 16 short tons (14 long tons; 15 t).

== Leadership ==
Presidents

- Alexander E. Orr (1906–1907)
- William H. Pearson (1907–???)
- James B. Mabon (1915–1931)
- Edward H. H. Simmons (1932–1936)
- William McChesney Martin (1940-42)

== Context within the safe deposit industry ==
During the existence of the NYSE SDC, New York State's safe deposit industry experienced significant growth. The number of safe deposit companies in New York State increased from 46 in 1915 to 65 by 1921.
