= Perky =

Perky may refer to:

- Henry Perky (1843–1906), American lawyer, businessman
- Kirtland I. Perky (1867–1939), American politician
- Cheves Perky (Mary Cheves West Perky, 1874–1940), American psychologist
- Pinky and Perky, British children's television series

== See also ==
- Perker (disambiguation)
