= ARA Parker =

At least two ships of the Argentine Navy have been named Parker:

- ARA Parker (M-11), a Bouchard-class minesweeper commissioned in 1937 and decommissioned in 1963.
- ARA Parker (P-44), an Espora-class corvette launched in 1984.
