= Justice Parker =

Justice Parker may refer to:

- Alton B. Parker (1852–1926), chief judge of the New York Court of Appeals
- Amasa J. Parker (1807–1890), justice of the New York Supreme Court and an ex officio judge of the New York Court of Appeals
- Charles Wolcott Parker (1862–1948), associate justice of the New Jersey Supreme Court
- Emmett N. Parker (1859–1939), associate justice of the Washington Supreme Court
- Frank W. Parker (1860–1932), associate justice of the New Mexico Supreme Court
- Glenn Parker (judge) (1898–1989), associate justice of the Wyoming Supreme Court
- Hubert Parker, Baron Parker of Waddington (1900–1972), Lord Chief Justice of England from 1958 to 1971
- Isaac Parker (Massachusetts judge) (1768–1830), associate justice of the Massachusetts Supreme Judicial Court
- Jay S. Parker (1895–1969), associate justice of the Kansas Supreme Court
- Joel Parker (jurist) (1795–1875), associate justice of the New Hampshire Supreme Court
- Joel Parker (politician) (1816–1888), associate justice of the New Jersey Supreme Court
- John M. Parker (New York politician) (1805–1873), judge on the New York Court of Appeals
- Judith Parker (born 1950), judge in the UK High Court, Family division
- R. Hunt Parker (1892–1969), associate justice and chief justice of the North Carolina Supreme Court
- Richard Parker (judge, born 1729) (1729–1813), associate justice of the Supreme Court of Appeals of Virginia
- Richard E. Parker (1783–1840), associate justice of the Supreme Court of Appeals of Virginia (grandson of the above Richard Parker)
- Roger Parker (judge) (1923–2011), Lord Justice of Appeal of the Court of Appeal of England
- Sarah Parker (born 1942), chief justice of the North Carolina Supreme Court
- Thomas Parker, 1st Earl of Macclesfield (1666–1732), Lord Chief Justice of the Privy Council of England from 1710 to 1718
- Tom Parker (judge) (born 1951), associate justice of the Alabama Supreme Court
- Will Parker (judge) (born c. 1980), associate justice of the Alabama Supreme Court

== See also ==
- Judge Parker (disambiguation)
