= Parker and Lee =

- Industry: Public relations
- Founded: 1904; 122 years ago in New York City, United States
- Founder: George F. Parker; Ivy Lee
- Headquarters: United States

Parker and Lee was founded in 1904 by Ivy Lee and George F. Parker in New York City. Parker and Lee was the third ever public relations agency to be established in the United States. Parker had served as President Grover Cleveland's press agent through all three of his campaigns.

Parker and Lee had clients such as Pennsylvania Railroad Company, the Rockefeller Family, the American Tobacco Company, the New York Subway System, and some Hollywood Studios.

== About ==
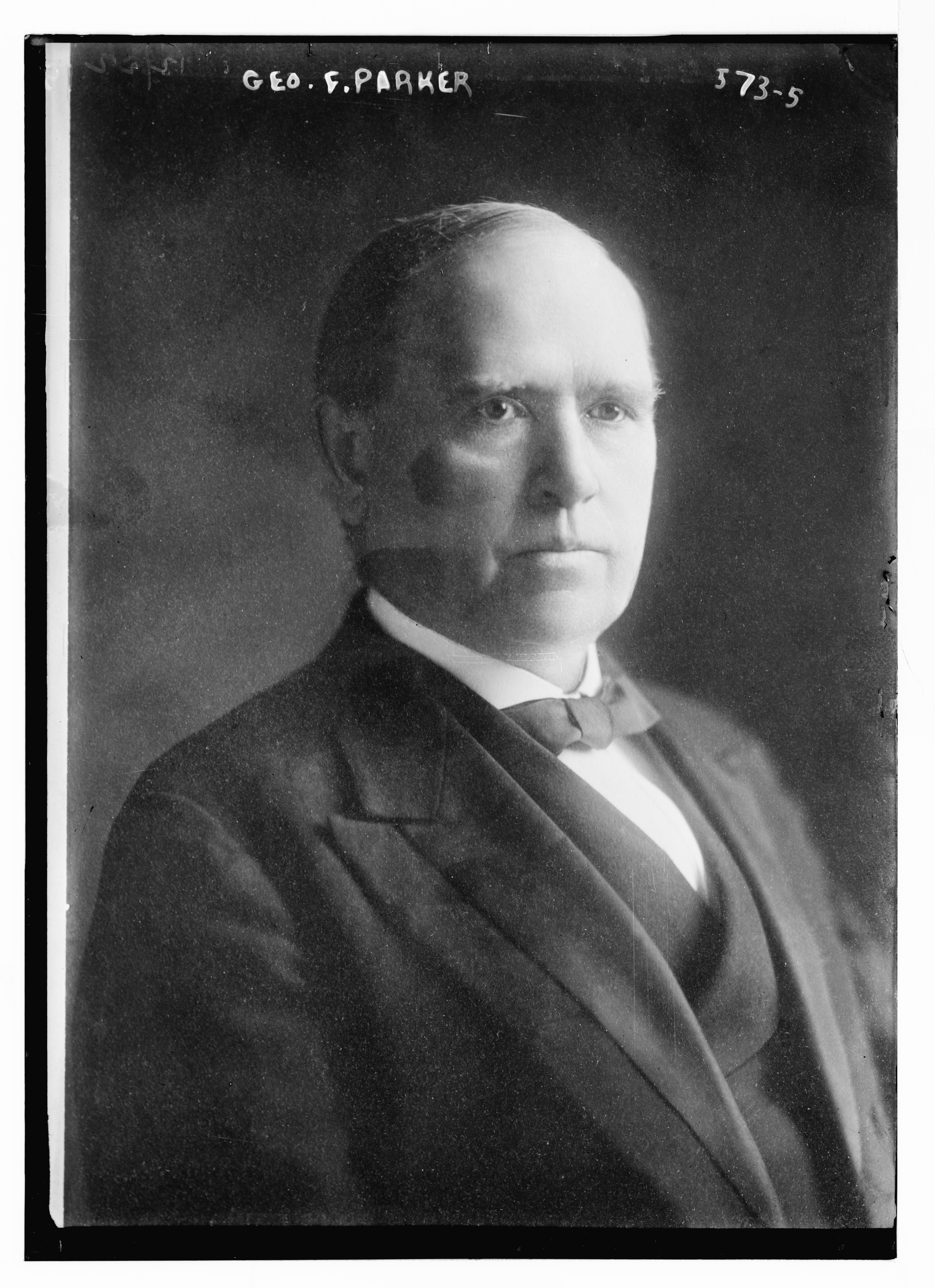
George F. Parker

The firm rose quickly in the years immediately after its founding, gaining lucrative clients like the Pennsylvania Railroad Company in 1906, which was at the time under public scrutiny for denying information and interviews to journalists. Ivy Lee supported a rate hike for the Pennsylvania Railroad Company workers, which the railroad had hired the firm to build support for a 5% rate hike. The firm devised a campaign which included all major stakeholders, media, railroad employees, customers, federally elected officials, etc.

Parker and Lee also worked for the Colorado Fuel & Iron Company during the controversial 1915 oilmen's strike, and later worked to end the American trade embargo on the Soviet Union. The firm came under fire during WWII because it had done consulting work for German industrial giant IG Farben.

== Bibliography ==
- Margaret A. Blanchard (19 December 2013). History of the Mass Media in the United States: An Encyclopedia. Routledge. p. 309. ISBN 978-1-135-91742-5.
- Scott M. Cutlip (5 November 2013). The Unseen Power: Public Relations: A History. Routledge. p. 48. ISBN 978-1-136-69000-6.
